= Perfect Alibi =

- Directed by: Kevin Meyer
- Written by: Kevin Meyer
- Based on: Where's Mommy Now? by Rochelle Majer Krich
- Produced by: William Hart
- Starring: Hector Elizondo; Teri Garr; Kathleen Quinlan; Alex McArthur; Lydie Denier; Charles Martin Smith
- Cinematography: Doyle Smith
- Edited by: David H. Lloyd
- Music by: Amotz Plessner
- Distributed by: Rysher Entertainment
- Release date: 1995
- Running time: 98 minutes
- Country: United States
- Language: English

Perfect Alibi is a 1995 American crime film directed by Kevin Meyer and starring Teri Garr and Hector Elizondo. It is based on the 1990 novel Where's Mommy Now? by Rochelle Majer Krich.

== Plot ==
The wealthy Melanie and Keith Bauers are a married couple with two beautiful children. They decide to hire a French au pair, Janine. At first, things in the household run smoothly under Janine's care. However Melanie's sister Paula discovers that Janine and Keith are having an adulterous affair and is thereafter killed in an "accident". A private detective Paula hired is killed shortly thereafter. Soon, Melanie's life is in danger. Laney Tolbert, Melanie's best friend, teams up with a police detective to find the culprits responsible.

== Cast ==
- Teri Garr as Laney Tolbert
- Hector Elizondo as Detective Ryker
- Alex McArthur as Keith Bauers
- Lydie Denier as Janine
- Kathleen Quinlan as Melanie Bauers
- Charles Martin Smith as Franklin Dupard
- Anne Ramsay as Paula Simpson
- Gedde Watanabe as Detective Onoda
- Bruce McGill as Detective Spivak

== Critical reception ==
Time Out wrote, "Your basic Hand That Rocks the Cradle knock-off. French au pair, employed by wealthy Americans, takes charge of kids, husband, house and car, edging the wife and mother out of the picture and rubbing out anyone in the way. Family friend Garr investigates, helped by sympathetic cop Elizondo and sleazy private eye Smith, leading to a highly uninteresting conclusion. With its boring, high-key TV-movie look, banal script, and comatose performances, it makes Curtis Hanson's creaky Rebecca De Mornay vehicle seem the pinnacle of the genre."
