= Michael Shamus Wiles =

American actor

- Born: October 27, 1955 (age 70); Everett, Washington, U.S.
- Occupation: Actor
- Years active: 1982–present

Michael Shamus Wiles (born October 27, 1955) is an American character actor of film and television onscreen since the 1980s who has appeared in over 100 films and television shows.

== Early life ==
Wiles was born in Everett, Washington, and raised in Bangor, Michigan.

== Career ==
He portrayed Marc Mitscher in Pearl Harbor and Mr. Parmagi in Hellraiser: Inferno. He is also known for recurring roles as ASAC George Merkert on Breaking Bad and as Jury on Sons of Anarchy. Other notable appearances include Puppet Master 4, Lost Highway, Fight Club, Rock Star and Transformers. In 2011, he appeared in Rockstar Games hit detective game L.A. Noire as Fire Chief Albert Lynch. He appeared in a 2015 production of the Hydrogen Jukebox.

== Filmography ==
=== Film ===
| Year | Title | Role | Notes |
|---|---|---|---|
| 1986 | Terror at Tenkiller | Tor | |
| 1987 | The Danger Zone | Curtis | |
| 1988 | Vampire at Midnight | Gunman 1 | |
| 1988 | Rented Lips | Porno Crew | |
| 1989 | Cole Justice | Wes Santee | |
| 1990 | Leatherface: The Texas Chainsaw Massacre III | Checkpoint Officer | |
| 1990 | Across Five Aprils | Burdow | |
| 1990 | Crash and Burn | Cop | Uncredited |
| 1992 | Invasion of Privacy | Alex's Father | |
| 1992 | Eddie Presley | Asylum Inmate | |
| 1992 | Trancers III | Police Officer #1 | |
| 1993 | Under Investigation | Forensic Officer | |
| 1994 | Puppet Master 4 | Stanley | |
| 1994 | Death Riders | Nose | |
| 1994 | The Puppet Masters | Captain Earley | |
| 1996 | The Sweeper | Jeremiah Pope | |
| 1996 | Up Close and Personal | WFIL Cameraman | |
| 1996 | Sticks & Stones | Hayes' Dad | |
| 1996 | Paper Dragons | Greg | |
| 1997 | Lost Highway | Mike The Guard | |
| 1997 | Conspiracy Theory | Cop At Roosevelt Hospital | |
| 1997 | Steel | Skinhead #2 | |
| 1998 | Fallen | Prison Guard | |
| 1998 | Desperate Measures | Tough Inmate | |
| 1998 | The X-Files | Black-Haired Man | |
| 1998 | Ted | The Neighbor | |
| 1998 | The Negotiator | Taylor | |
| 1999 | Fight Club | The Bartender In Halo | |
| 1999 | Held Up | Biker | |
| 1999 | Magnolia | Captain Muffy | |
| 2000 | Spanish Judges | Wellings | |
| 2000 | Hellraiser: Inferno | Mr. Parmagi | |
| 2000 | Dude, Where's My Car? | Interrogation Detective | Uncredited |
| 2001 | Pearl Harbor | Marc Mitscher | |
| 2001 | A.I. Artificial Intelligence | Cop | |
| 2001 | Rock Star | Mr. Cole | |
| 2001 | The Theory of the Leisure Class | Ben Ekerhardt | |
| 2002 | Dark Blue | Internal Affairs Detective | Uncredited |
| 2004 | Able Edwards | Chairman Lowery | |
| 2005 | Neo Ned | Lou "Luke" Nelson / Ned's Dad | |
| 2005 | Mortuary | Sheriff Howell | |
| 2006 | Art School Confidential | Donald Baumgarten | |
| 2006 | Special | Cop #1 | |
| 2007 | Smiley Face | Officer Jones | |
| 2007 | Finishing the Game | Police Officer Williams | |
| 2007 | Transformers | Two Star General | |
| 2007 | D-War | Evil General | |
| 2007 | The Gene Generation | Soleman | |
| 2007 | Home of the Giants | The Principal | Uncredited |
| 2008 | Ball Don't Lie | Coach Reynolds | |
| 2009 | Convict | Anderson | |
| 2012 | Ticket Out | Danvers | |
| 2012 | The Lords of Salem | Jarrett Perkins | |
| 2012 | K-11 | Captain Davis | |
| 2013 | Saving Lincoln | Cranston Laurie | |
| 2013 | Iron Man 3 | The Bartender | Uncredited |
| 2015 | The Bronze | Vet | |
| 2015 | Loaded | The Sheriff | |
| 2015 | The Lost One | Mr. Death | |
| 2016 | Let Me Make You a Martyr | Father Francis | |
| 2017 | Death Note | Captain | |
| 2018 | Eat Me | Frank | |
| 2018 | Lake Alice | Hank | |
| 2019 | Rumble Strip | Ozu | |

=== Television ===
| Year | Title | Role | Notes |
|---|---|---|---|
| 1993 | Dr. Quinn, Medicine Woman | Ben | Episode: "Bad Water" |
| 1993 | Black Widow Murders: The Blanche Taylor Moore Story | Guy In Bar | Television film |
| 1994 | Shattered Image | Blitzer | Television film |
| 1994 | Ellen | The Bartender | Episode: "The Houseguest" |
| 1994 | Fortune Hunter | Rangoon Sim | Episode: "The Frostfire Intercept" |
| 1995 | Diagnosis: Murder | George | Episode: "How to Murder Your Lawyer" |
| 1995 | Cybill | Tony | Episode: "Death and Exes" |
| 1996 | The Client | Man | Episode: "The Good Samaritan" |
| 1996 | Melrose Place | Dave | 3 episodes |
| 1997 | L.A. Heat | Monk | Episode: "Cop Star" |
| 1997 | Profiler | Bryce Radford | Episode: "Crisis" |
| 1997 | Murphy Brown | Museum Guard | Episode: "Hero Today, Gone Tomorrow" |
| 1998–2000 | The X-Files | Black-Haired Man | 2 episodes |
| 1999 | Family Law | Judge | Episode: "The Nanny" |
| 2001 | Star Trek: Voyager | Captain Bosaal | Episode: "The Void" |
| 2001–2002 | The Agency | Pete | 3 episodes |
| 2002 | Night of the Wolf | Crawford | Television film |
| 2002 | Roswell | Watcher | Episode: "Graduation" |
| 2002 | Robbery Homicide Division | Detective Mike Walker | Episode: "A Life of Its Own" |
| 2002–2003 | Malcolm in the Middle | Boyd | 2 episodes |
| 2003 | A Painted House | 'Stick' Peters | Television film |
| 2003 | CSI: Crime Scene Investigation | Rob Rubio | Episode: "Inside the Box" |
| 2003 | Hard Ground | Mundo | Television film |
| 2003 | Angel | 'Spanky' | Episode: "Conviction" |
| 2003 | NCIS | Jimmy | Episode: "Minimum Security" |
| 2004 | American Dreams | Captain O'Neill | 2 episodes |
| 2004 | NYPD Blue | The Bartender | Episode: "Great Balls of Ire" |
| 2005 | Cold Case | Father Andrew Stillman | Episode: "Revenge" |
| 2005 | Jake in Progress | 'Big T' | Episode: "Check Please" |
| 2005 | Detective | Kralik | Television film |
| 2005 | Numbers | Carl Baker | Episode: "Dirty Bomb" |
| 2005 | The Inside | Karl Robie Sr. | Episode: "Little Girl Lost" |
| 2006 | Boston Legal | Ned Hayden | Episode: "Too Much Information" |
| 2006 | Night Stalker | Bernard Faroux / Walter Prees | Episode: "Into Night" |
| 2006 | Monk | Jimmy Cusack | Episode: "Mr. Monk and the Garbage Strike" |
| 2006 | Just Legal | Detective J. Orosco | Episode: "The Code" |
| 2006 | Medium | The Sheriff | Episode: "Blood Relation" |
| 2007 | Close to Home | Detective Logan | Episode: "Drink the Cup" |
| 2008 | Criminal Minds | Chester Hardwick | Episode: "Damaged" |
| 2008 | The Young and the Restless | Richard Wells | 2 episodes |
| 2008 | Life | Jack Reese's Passenger | 2 episodes |
| 2008 | The Unit | General Navarro | Episode: "Into Hell: Part One" |
| 2008–2014 | Sons of Anarchy | 'Jury' White | 5 episodes |
| 2009 | Hydra | Captain Sweet | Television film |
| 2009 | Dark Blue | Mott | Episode: "O.I.S." |
| 2009–2012 | Breaking Bad | ASAC George Merkert | 11 episodes |
| 2011 | Justified | Winston Baines | Episode: "Cottonmouth" |
| 2012 | The Mentalist | Walter DeMunn | Episode: "Cherry Picked" |
| 2013 | Last Resort | General MacAvoy | Episode: "Damn the Torpedoes" |
| 2014 | Killer Women | Colt Ritter | Episode: "Daughter of the Alamo" |
| 2016 | Grey's Anatomy | Dr. Joel Miller | Episode: "All Eyez on Me" |
| 2017 | Midnight, Texas | John 'Farmer John' | Episode: "Last Temptation of Midnight" |
| 2018 | American Crime Story | Detective Tichich | Episode: "House by the Lake" |

=== Video games ===
| Year | Title | Role | Notes |
|---|---|---|---|
| 1998 | Dune 2000 | Imperial General | |
| 2004 | Fight Club | The Bartender In Halo | |
| 2011 | L.A. Noire | Albert Lynch | |
