= Kevin Meyer =

Kevin Meyer may refer to:

- Kevin Meyer (director), American filmmaker, director and writer
- Kevin Meyer (politician) (born 1956), American politician

== See also ==
- Kevin Mayer (born 1992), French athlete
- Kevin A. Mayer (born 1962), American business executive
- Kevin Myers (born 1947), English-born Irish journalist and writer
