= Rochelle Majer Krich =

American novelist

- Born: 1947 (age 78–79); Bayreuth, Bavaria, Germany
- Education: Stern College for Women; University of California, Los Angeles
- Occupation: Writer
- Children: 6
- Writing career
- Genre: Mystery fiction
- Notable awards: Anthony Award (1991); Simon & Schuster Mary Higgins Clark Award (2005)

Rochelle Majer Krich (born 1947) was a writer of mystery novels and winner of an Anthony Award and the Mary Higgins Clark Award. She died September 14, 2025.

== Biography ==
Krich was born in Bayreuth, Germany but emigrated to the United States in 1951, moving to Los Angeles in 1960. Her parents were survivors of the Holocaust who met after the war, her father's first wife and daughters having been murdered in the camps. She graduated in English from Stern College for Women and met her husband while studying for a master's at UCLA. She was married with six children and taught in an orthodox Jewish high school in Los Angeles for many years.

Her first published novel Where's Mommy Now? won the Anthony Award for best paperback original and was adapted into film in 1995 as Perfect Alibi, starring Teri Garr, Hector Elizondo, and Kathleen Quinlan.

Her first series is set in Los Angeles and concerns Jessie Drake, a divorced homicide detective who has a difficult relationship with her mother and sisters. In the second novel, Angel of Death, Jessie unexpectedly discovers that her mother is Jewish and that family members were murdered in the Holocaust. Her second series features Molly Blume, from an orthodox Jewish family.

== Published works ==
=== Jessie Drake series ===
- Fair Game (Mysterious Press, 1993). ISBN 089296507X
- Angel of Death (Mysterious Press, 1994). ISBN 0892965088
- Blood Money (Avon Twilight, 1999). ISBN 0380973790
- Dead Air (Avon Twilight, 2000). ISBN 0380977699
- Shadows of Sin (William Morrow, 2001). ISBN 0380977702

=== Molly Blume series ===
- Blues in the Night (Ballantine Books, 2002). ISBN 0345449711
- Dream House (Ballantine Books, 2003). ISBN 034544972X
- Grave Endings (Ballantine Books, 2004). ISBN 0345468104
- Now You See Me... (Ballantine Books, 2005). ISBN 0345468120

=== Other novels ===
- Where's Mommy Now? (Pinnacle, 1990). ISBN 1558173668 - Won 1991 Anthony Award for Best Paperback Original
- Till Death Do Us Part (Avon, 1992). ISBN 0380765330
- Nowhere to Run (Avon, 1994). ISBN 0380765349
- Speak No Evil (Mysterious Press, 1996). ISBN 0892965843
- Fertile Ground (Avon, 1998). ISBN 0380973782
