= Speed bump (disambiguation) =

A speed bump is a bump on a road designed to slow traffic.

Speed bump may also refer to:

- Speed Bump, a comic strip by Dave Coverly
- A skin rash that may result from injecting methamphetamine
- A type of task assigned to teams on the reality TV series The Amazing Race
- Speedbumps: Flooring It Through Hollywood, a 2006 autobiography by American actress Teri Garr
- The "speed bumps" in fire-safe cigarettes to cause them to be extinguish early if not being inhaled regularly.
