= Good Advice (TV series) =

American television sitcom

- Promotional advertisement for the series
- Genre: Sitcom
- Created by: Danny Jacobson; Norma Safford Vela
- Starring: Shelley Long; Treat Williams; George Wyner; Teri Garr; Christopher McDonald; Estelle Harris; Ross Malinger; Henriette Mantel
- Composer: Jonathan Wolff
- Country of origin: United States
- Original language: English
- No. of seasons: 2
- No. of episodes: 19 (+2 unaired pilots)

Production
- Executive producer: Danny Jacobson
- Producers: Tom Palmer; Mimi Friedman; Pamela Grant; Marco Bario; Martin Mickelson; Peter Tolan
- Editor: Dann Cahn
- Camera setup: Multi-camera
- Running time: 30 minutes
- Production companies: In Front Productions; Itzbinso Long Productions; TriStar Television

Original release
- Network: CBS
- Release: April 2, 1993 – August 10, 1994

Good Advice is an American television sitcom produced by In Front Productions, Itzbinso Long Productions and TriStar Television that aired for two seasons on CBS from April 2, 1993, to August 10, 1994. It was co-created and executive produced by Danny Jacobson and Norma Safford Vela; and starred Shelley Long and Treat Williams.

== Synopsis ==
Dr. Susan DeRuzza (Shelley Long) is a successful marriage therapist and the author of a best-selling book on the subject, Giving and Forgiving. Upon returning from a six-week promotional tour she discovers her husband of 11 years, Joey (Christopher McDonald), in bed with another woman. Furthermore, when she returns to her therapy office, she learns she is now sharing it with high-profile divorce attorney Jack Harold (Treat Williams). While Susan and Jack don't agree on the basics of relationships, love or marriage, the one thing they do share is an undeniable sexual chemistry. Susan's confidant, Artie (George Wyner), tries to lend support at the office and her sister Paige (Teri Garr) and son Michael (Ross Malinger) try to help at home.

== Cast ==
=== Main ===
- Shelley Long as Susan DeRuzza
- Treat Williams as Jack Harold
- Christopher McDonald (season 1) and Peter Onorati (season 2) as Joey DeRuzza
- Ross Malinger as Michael DeRuzza
- Kiersten Warren as Lynn Casey (pilot only)
- George Wyner as Artie Cohen
- Estelle Harris as Ronnie Cohen (season 1)
- Lightfield Lewis as Sean Trombitas
- Henriette Mantel as Henriette Campbell (season 2)
- Teri Garr as Paige Anderson (season 2)

=== Guest stars ===
- Wendie Malick as Janet
- Anne Meara as Verna
- Peter Onorati as Chazz Bigelow
- Xander Berkeley as Bernard
- Lisa Edelstein as Robin
- Laura Innes as Annie
- Liz Torres as Juanita
- Mindy Sterling as Jill
- Jean Speegle Howard as Mrs. Coulson
- Maggie Roswell as Betsy Miller

== Episodes ==
=== Series overview ===
Season	Episodes	Originally released	
Season	Episodes	First released	Last released
1	6	April 2, 1993	May 7, 1993
2	13	May 23, 1994	August 10, 1994

=== Season 1 (1993) ===
No. overall	No. in season	Title	Directed by	Written by	Original release date	Prod. code	Viewers (millions)
1	1	"Pilot"	Barnet Kellman	Danny Jacobson & Norma Safford Vela	April 2, 1993	01001	15.6
2	2	"Jack of Hearts"	Barnet Kellman	Danny Jacobson	April 9, 1993	01002	12.0
3	3	"Special Session"	Barnet Kellman	Danny Jacobson & Daniel Palladino	April 16, 1993	01003	12.0
4	4	"The Kiss"	Barnet Kellman	Gina Wendkos	April 26, 1993	01005	16.6
5	5	"Sunshine on My Shoulder"	Barnet Kellman	Mark Blutman & Howard Busgang	April 30, 1993	01006	9.0
6	6	"Turning Thirteen"	Barnet Kellman	Gary H. Miller	May 7, 1993	01004	9.2

=== Season 2 (1994) ===
No. overall	No. in season	Title	Directed by	Written by	Original release date	Prod. code	Viewers (millions)
7	1	"The Big One"	Ted Bessell	Michael Patrick King & Tom Palmer	May 23, 1994	02001	11.1
8	2	"Two Times Twenty"	Alan Rafkin	Peter Tolan	May 30, 1994	02005	13.5
9	3	"Divorce, Egyptian Style"	Robby Benson	Tom Palmer	June 6, 1994	02008	16.2
10	4	"Lights, Camera, Friction!"	Robby Benson	Peter Tolan	June 13, 1994	02012	14.4
11	5	"Roll Out the Barrel"	Michael Lembeck	Michael Patrick King	June 15, 1994	02006	8.0
12	6	"Brother, Can You Spare a Date?"	Art Dielhenn	Elaine Aronson	June 29, 1994	02004	9.0
13	7	"The Gay Divorcee"	Ted Bessell	Jeanette Collins & Mimi Friedman	July 6, 1994	02009	10.1
14	8	"Making Out is Hard to Do"	Michael Lembeck	Jeanette Collins & Mimi Friedman	July 13, 1994	02013	9.4
15	9	"I'm Not Ready for My Closeup, Dr. DeRuzza"	Michael Patrick King	David Flebotte & David Caldwell and David Kohan & Max Mutchnick	July 20, 1994	02011	9.4
16	10	"Bill's as Is"	Michael Lembeck	Elaine Aronson	July 27, 1994	02003	9.7
17	11	"A Chance of Showers"	Ted Bessell	Elaine Aronson	August 10, 1994	02002	9.5
18	12	"I Am Woman, Hear Me Snore"	Ted Bessell	Michael Patrick King & Tom Palmer	Unaired	02010	N/A
19	13	"Desperately Using Susan"	Michael Lembeck	Russ Woody	Unaired	02007	N/A

== History ==
Good Advice was intended to debut at the very beginning of the 1992–1993 season, but became a mid-season replacement on CBS in spring 1993 because the network's fall schedule was overcrowded. The initial order garnered solid ratings and generally positive critical reviews. This was Shelley Long's first return to series television after leaving her role as Diane Chambers on Cheers and also the first sitcom for Treat Williams.

CBS renewed the series for a second season, set to premiere Friday, Oct. 22, 1993, but production was halted after Long became sick with the flu. Long's illness prompted the network to put the show on indefinite hiatus; the season premiere aired in the summer of 1994, but the show was cancelled after the season ended.

For the second season, Estelle Harris as Artie's mother and Christopher McDonald as Susan's ex-husband Joey were cut as regulars in lieu of bringing in Teri Garr as Susan's sister. Henriette Mantel also joined the cast in season 2.

Good Advice staff writers included Michael Patrick King and Max Mutchnick.
