= Henriette Mantel =

American actress

- Born: Newfane, Vermont, U.S.
- Occupations: Film actress; producer; screenwriter
- Years active: 1990–present

Henriette Mantel is an American writer, actress, producer, director, and stand-up comic from Vermont.

== Biography ==
She was born and raised in Newfane, Vermont.

In the late 1970s, she spent two years in Washington, D.C., working with political activist Ralph Nader at his Center for the Study of Responsive Law. Nearly thirty years later, she co-wrote and co-directed An Unreasonable Man, a 2006 documentary that traces the life and career of Nader, with her friend Steve Skrovan. The movie was a hit at Sundance.

She has worked in documentary and reality television as a writer/producer on such shows as the Emmy Award winning The Osbournes and Michael Moore's The Awful Truth. She won her first Emmy for writing on Win Ben Stein's Money. Most recently, she was a consultant for HBO's The Comeback and co-authored the book Speedbumps: Flooring It Through Hollywood with Teri Garr.

In 1989, during her pursuit of stand-up comedy, Mantel appeared on many television shows including Carolines Comedy Hour and VH-1 Stand-up Spotlight.

As an actress, Mantel has appeared in many feature films and television comedies. She appeared in The Brady Bunch films as Alice the maid. She played Shelley Long's lovable nanny in the second season of the CBS sitcom Good Advice. She also appeared in an episode of Friends as a nurse in the 23rd episode of the eighth season, "The One Where Rachel Has a Baby." Mantel also played a nurse in the final episode of Everybody Loves Raymond, who explains a complication with Ray's adenoid surgery to his family.

Mantel appeared in the pilot episode of the long-running comedy series The Office. While only credited as "Office Worker", it was revealed that she was supposed to be Meredith Palmer. Her role would be recast with Kate Flannery taking over for the entirety of the series.

== Books ==
- Speedbumps: Flooring It Through Hollywood (with Teri Garr (Plume 2006) (ISBN 0452285712)
- No Kidding: Women Writers on Bypassing Parenthood (Seal Press) (ISBN 978-1580054430)
