= Television timeout =

Sports term

A television timeout (alternately TV timeout or media timeout) is a break in a televised live event for the purpose of television broadcasting. This allows commercial broadcasters to take an advertising break, or issue their required hourly station identification, without causing viewers to miss part of the action.

Programs making use of timeouts are usually live-action sporting events. However, other live programs occasionally make use of timeouts for advertising purposes, such as the Academy Awards and the Eurovision Song Contest.

== Use by sport ==
=== American football (NFL) ===
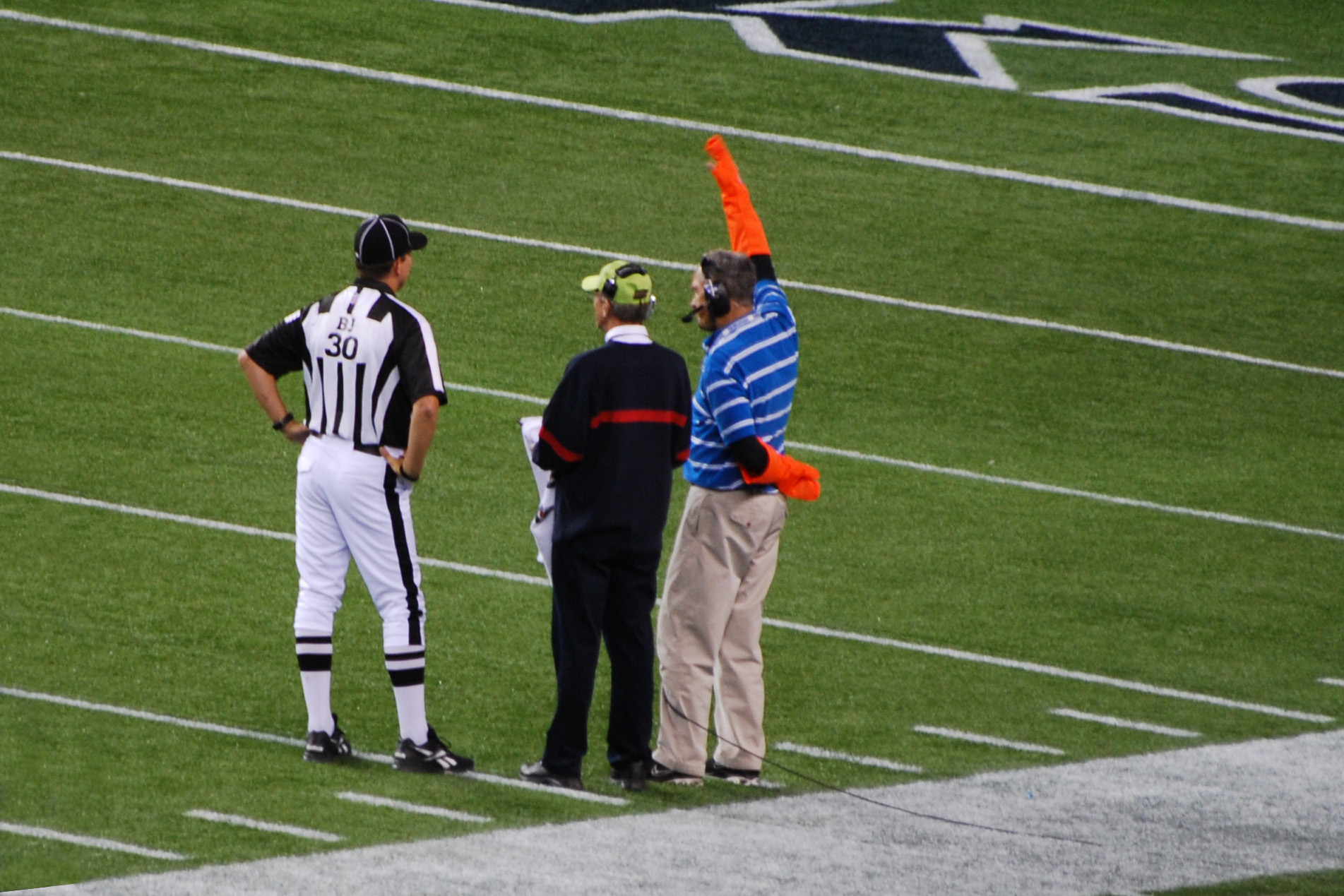
The network television coordinator with orange sleeves raises an arm during the television timeout, then lowers it when the broadcaster returns to coverage.

The National Football League requires sixteen commercial breaks per game, with eight in each half. The exception to this is overtime, which has one; that is at the two-minute warning if the period gets that far. These breaks run either one minute or two minutes in length. Of the eight commercial breaks per regulation half, two are mandatory: at the end of the first and third quarters, and at the two-minute warning for the end of each half. The remaining six breaks are optional. The timeouts can be applied after field goal tries, conversion attempts for both one and two points following touchdowns, changes in possession either by punts or turnovers, and kickoffs (except for the ones that start each half, or are within the last five minutes). The breaks are also called during stoppages due to injury, instant replay challenges, when either of the participating teams uses one of its set of timeouts, and if the network needs to catch up on its commercial advertisement schedule. The arrangement for college football contests is the same.

A network television coordinator on the field wears a long pair of blaze orange gloves and indicates a television timeout with one arm raised, then lowers it when the game broadcaster returns to coverage.

=== Association football ===
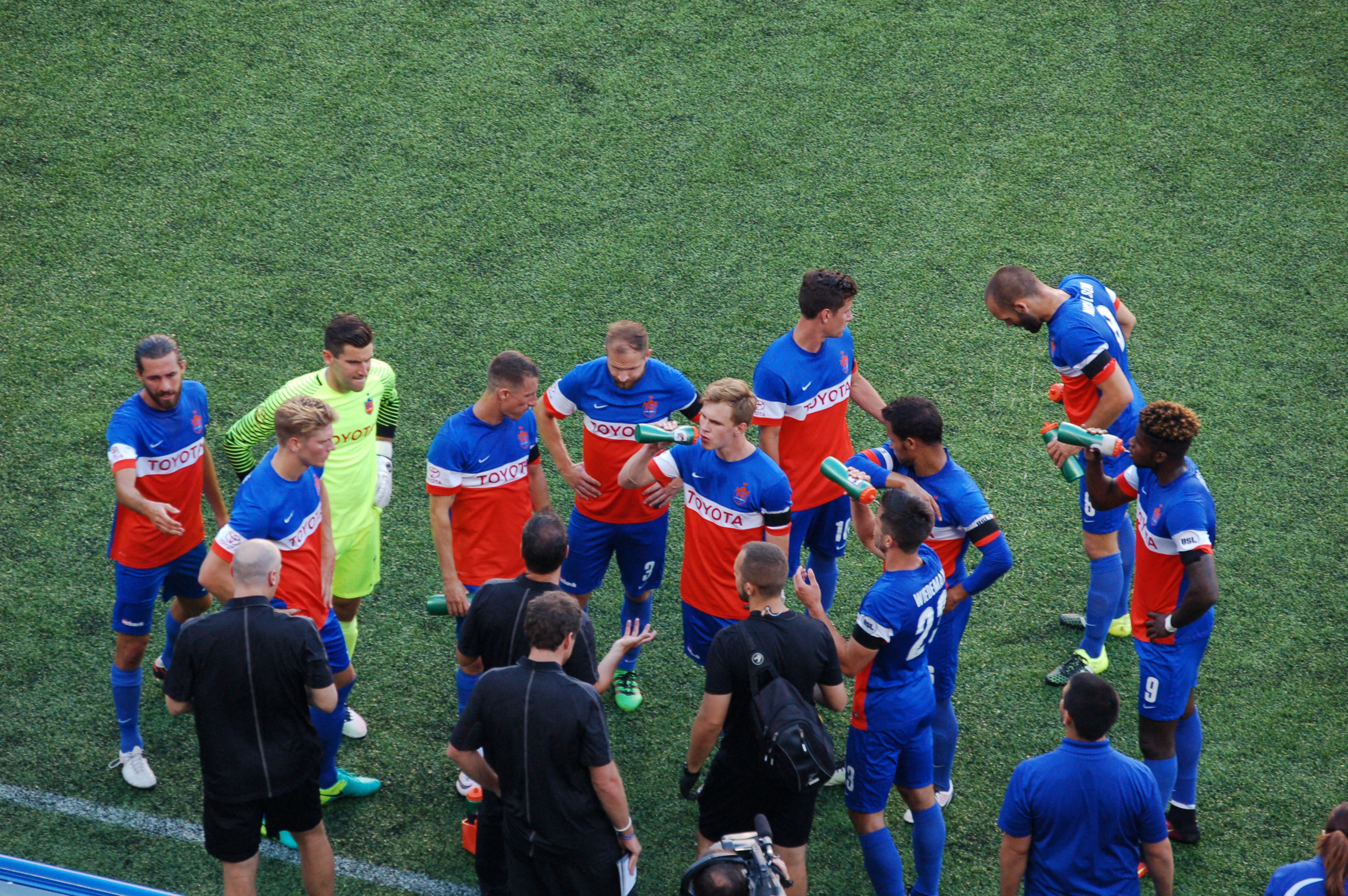
FC Cincinnati hydration break

Association football (or soccer) has no formal television timeouts or commercial breaks, due to the continuous live action from opening kick throughout a half to the whistle at the conclusion of stoppage time. However, the interval between the two halves is approximately 15 minutes.

There are no commercial breaks during any extra periods or during any penalty shootouts in FIFA World Cup matches; however, television timeouts are likely to happen between the end of the second half and extra time, and between the end of extra time and the penalty shootout, depending on the broadcaster. Additionally, for the 2026 FIFA World Cup, FIFA introduced mandatory three-minute hydration breaks in each half, scheduled around the 22nd minute; while the measure was presented as a health and safety measure, the breaks were criticized for their use by some broadcasters to air advertisements.

During the 2021/22 season, the Australian A-League Men TV broadcast games introduced a short break of approximately one minute that takes place in the middle of each half of the game. Initially these breaks were disguised to the viewers as being FIFA-mandated hot weather "drink breaks", but were subsequently taken in games held during cool night time conditions and referees could be heard on pitch side microphones confirming a delay for ad breaks. Following player and fan complaints the practice was abandoned (legitimate hot weather water breaks still occur).

=== Australian rules football ===
After a goal has been scored, before the umpire bounces the ball in the center square to restart play, they go to commercial for 30 seconds on free-to-air television only. There is no TV timeout after a behind is scored.

=== Baseball ===
No formal television timeout, but the interval between the end of a half-inning is set between two and three minutes for televised games, and during pitching changes that happen in the middle of an inning for the pitcher to warm up. The pitch clocks surrounding the field are used to indicate to spectators and those on the field how much time remains before the inning's start and the game broadcasters have returned to coverage of the game.

=== Basketball ===
==== College men ====
In college basketball, there is a break at the first whistle after 4-minute intervals (beyond the 16, 12, 8, and 4-minute marks of each half). Additionally, the first timeout requested by either team in the second half shall become the length of a timeout called for by the electronic-media agreement; and in men's NCAA tournament play, the first timeout requested by either team in both halves becomes that length of timeout. If free throws are to be shot, a timeout is taken first. Effective with the 2015–16 season, when a team calls a timeout within the 30-second window before the next scheduled TV timeout break, the called timeout takes the place of the scheduled TV timeout.

==== College women and FIBA ====
Media timeouts are taken at the first whistle after the 5-minute mark in each quarter. Any called timeout before then becomes the media timeout. As in men's play, the first team-requested timeout in the second half becomes a full-length media timeout in addition to the other timeouts. Organisers have the option in FIBA play to implement television timeouts at the next whistle following the same points.

==== NBA ====
In the NBA, there must be two timeouts in each quarter (known as mandatory timeouts). These timeouts only occur at the first whistle after a certain minute mark.

1st mandatory timeout (less than 7 minutes remaining)

In each quarter if no team has called a timeout, one is automatically charged to the home team.

2nd mandatory timeout (less than 3 minutes remaining)

In each quarter if a timeout by each team has not been taken, one is automatically charged to the team not previously charged.

Length

The first timeout by each team in each quarter are 2 minutes 45 seconds for locally televised games, and 3 minutes 15 seconds for nationally televised games (including any games that may also be locally televised). Subsequent timeouts by the same team in a quarter are 1 minute 15 seconds in length.

=== Bowling ===
The Professional Bowlers Association rulebook does not contain any provisions on when a television timeout must be taken in the sport of bowling. Generally, such timeouts occur only between games. Commercial breaks during PBA Tour telecasts usually occur when the bowler who starts the match is about to bowl his sixth frame.

If a bowler is on pace for a perfect game of 300, the commercial breaks will not be taken.

=== Cricket ===
In cricket, television timeouts generally occur at the end of some overs as the field switches around, when a wicket falls, during drinks breaks and during intervals. In the 2009 season of the Indian Premier League of Twenty20 cricket, the halfway point of each innings contained a seven-and-a-half-minute stoppage of play, two-thirds of which were devoted to advertising time. After complaints by viewers and players (criticizing its use as an extended commercial break, and for breaking the flow of the game), these breaks were replaced in the following year by two compulsory "strategic timeouts" of two-and-a-half minutes per innings. One must be taken by the bowling team between the 6th to 10th overs, and the batting team between the 11th to 16th overs.

=== Curling ===
Timeouts in curling occur at the conclusion of each end. The game generally resumes before the commercial break ends, so when the broadcast comes back on a few rocks will have already been thrown (in the US).

=== Ice hockey ===
==== NHL ====
In the NHL, TV timeouts are taken at the first stoppages of play after the 14, 10, and 6-minute marks in each period when both teams are at even strength. The off-ice official in the penalty box to the left of the scorer's table will open the penalty box door and turn on a red light, signaling a TV timeout. TV timeouts in the NHL last for exactly 120 seconds (2 minutes). The red light is turned off at the conclusion of the TV timeout.

Under the following situations, there are no TV timeouts:

- After a goal
- After an icing
- During a power-play
- During the last 30 seconds of the first and second period
- During last two minutes of the third period
- Within one minute of the preceding TV timeout
- Following the goaltender causing a stoppage of play from a shoot-in from beyond center line
- Following a defending player causing a stoppage of play by dislodging the net (except when a penalty is assessed at that time)
- Following a face-off violation

There are exceptions for the above. Should a TV timeout window in that specific period be open and there is a delay, a TV timeout may be taken.

Additionally there are no timeouts, commercial or team, granted during a shootout.

Due to these restrictions, it is possible that not all of the scheduled breaks are taken, in which case sometimes a network will take a timeout at the conclusion of the game to make up for it before signing off on the broadcast.

Efforts must be made to identify the situations where a video review might happen in order to not go into a commercial time-out.

During outdoor games, a hard TV timeout is sometimes called at the 10-minute mark of the third period, depending on weather conditions, and play is immediately stopped (as they need to change ends of the ice to ensure fairness).

During overtime, television timeouts are taken only in the following situations:

- In the preseason and the regular season, between the end of the third period and the start of the overtime period, and between the end of the overtime period and the start of the shootout. No television timeouts are taken during the overtime period or during the shootout.
- In the postseason, TV timeouts are taken at the first stoppage of play after the 10-minute mark in any overtime period, but not every broadcaster will go to commercial. This is used for the ice crew to do a standard TV timeout shovel.

=== Motorsports ===
Most motorsport races are unable to accommodate television timeouts, but certain events, such as the NASCAR Camping World Truck Series, events are structured with a safety car after 20 minutes of green flag action to help inexperienced drivers acclimate themselves with pit stops (full green flag pit stops are discouraged in order to help younger drivers gain experience with live pit stops in a more controlled environment). In order to alleviate the lack of television timeout periods, technology such as Side-By-Side has been introduced. During the Sprint All-Star Race, commercials are only taken between periods after the pit stop, or during safety car situations.

=== Professional wrestling ===
Professional wrestling events which are broadcast on live television but not pay per view require scheduling of matches to fit the advertising breaks, with the general overview of segments in an event being known as "the format". Most matches are given limited time, so they start and finish between breaks but matches such as the main event may be scheduled over more than one segment. Due to the nature of modern wrestling where there are no rounds and matches are one fall to finish, the match has to continue for the stadium audience while the break happens. There is no "timeout", but the wrestlers have several tricks to use to keep up the appearance of the match, such as long rest holds, the "double knock down" clothesline spot, a wrestler taunting the opponent & the crowd, or a spectacular jump over the ropes that knocks down all the wrestlers until the break is over.

=== Tennis ===
In tennis, beginning after the third game of the set, commercial breaks are taken at the end of every odd-numbered game during players' changeovers and at the completion of any set. Commercial breaks are not taken during tiebreaks or during changeovers after 6–5 in the fifth set of a major men's match or 6–5 in the third set of a major women's match.

=== Volleyball and beach volleyball ===
In volleyball games governed by FIVB, television timeouts are referred to as technical time-outs and occur during each non-tie-breaking set.

== Use by other live events ==
The Academy Awards and other award ceremonies that are broadcast live have media timeouts at regular intervals. During this time, members of the audience may vacate their seats for various reasons (such as getting refreshments, going to the bathroom, going backstage for the next presentation, etc.) and seat fillers then scramble to make sure the entire theater or venue remains full for the TV cameras.

Each participating broadcaster of the Eurovision Song Contest is required to broadcast the show in its entirety: including all songs, recap, voting and reprise, skipping only the interval act for advertising breaks if they wish. Since 1999, broadcasters who wished to do so were given the opportunity to take more advertising breaks as short, non-essential hiatuses were introduced.
