= Terror at Tenkiller =

1986 American slasher film

- Blu-ray cover artwork
- Directed by: Ken Meyer
- Screenplay by: Claudia Meyer
- Story by: Ken Meyer; Claudia Meyer
- Produced by: Ken Meyer
- Starring: Stacey Logan; Michelle Merchant; Michael Shamus Wiles; Kevin Meyer
- Cinematography: Steven Wacks
- Edited by: Ken Meyer; Keith Melton
- Music by: Robert Farrar
- Production company: United Entertainment Pictures
- Distributed by: United Home Video
- Release date: February 17, 1987
- Running time: 87 minutes
- Country: United States
- Language: English
- Budget: $40,000

Terror at Tenkiller is a 1986 American slasher film directed and produced by Ken Meyer, and starring Stacey Logan, Michelle Merchant, Michael Shamus Wiles, and Kevin Meyer. Its plot follows two female college students spending their summer vacation at Lake Tenkiller in rural Oklahoma where a rash of grisly murders are occurring.

The film was produced and financed by the Tulsa-based United Entertainment Pictures, who hired documentary filmmaker Ken Meyer to direct the project; his son, actor Kevin Meyer, recruited several of his classmates from the USC School of Cinematic Arts to work on the project, including cinematographer Steven Wacks and actor Michael Shamus Wiles. Claudia Meyer, Ken's wife and Kevin's stepmother, wrote the screenplay. The film was shot entirely in Oklahoma near Lake Fort Gibson and the Fort Gibson Dam, not at the actual Tenkiller Ferry Lake where it is set.

Though shot on 16 mm film, Terror at Tenkiller was originally released directly-to-video in 1987 through United Home Video, and received a subsequent DVD release, followed by a digital RiffTrax edition featuring a humorous commentary by Kevin Murphy and Michael J. Nelson of Mystery Science Theater 3000. The film later underwent 4K restoration before being screened in Tulsa for its 35th anniversary in October 2021. A 4K UHD Blu-ray edition of the newly-restored print was released in July 2023 by Vinegar Syndrome.

== Plot ==
One night in rural Oklahoma, a marina worker named Tor murders Denise, a local waitress, by slitting her throat, then dumps her body in Lake Tenkiller.

The next day, college students Leslie and Janna head to Janna's family cabin near Lake Tenkiller for summer vacation. Leslie, though reluctant to spend the summer away from home, plans to use the opportunity to get away from her controlling and emotionally abusive fiancé, Josh. The women go for a swim in the lake, after which Janna recounts folklore about a Native American maiden who took revenge on an opposing tribe for killing her sister. The maiden murdered several warriors, the last of which she drowned in the lake, unintentionally drowning herself in the process.

At the Cove, a small diner owned by local Charlie, the women are observed by Tor, who takes an instant liking to Leslie. Shortly after Leslie and Janna's arrival, Tor stalks another waitress, Debbie, before stabbing her to death in her hot tub. He also stabs and dismembers his lecherous boss, Preacher, outside of Janna's home, after catching him spying on the women. Following Debbie's apparent disappearance, Charlie offers Leslie a temporary job waitressing part-time along with Janna.

Leslie and Janna grow to trust and like Tor and casually socialize with him. Meanwhile, Leslie receives a rash of phone calls from Josh, both at the cabin and at work. Late one afternoon, Janna goes out to tan by the lake while Leslie is working the closing shift alone at the diner. Janna falls asleep on the dock, and is awoken at nightfall by Tor, who has arrived by boat. Janna invites him into the cabin for a beer, and he proceeds to stab her to death while she washes her hair in the kitchen sink. Meanwhile, Leslie receives another phone call from Josh while alone at the diner, but dismisses him. Josh, having determined Leslie is at the lake, begins driving to Janna's cabin.

When Leslie returns home from work, she finds Janna's body in a boat on the dock and assumes Josh murdered her. Tor consoles Leslie, but soon admits that he was the one who killed Janna because he believed that she was a corrupting influence on Leslie. Leslie slashes Tor across the face with a set of keys and manages to escape. She tries to hide in the cabin basement via an exterior access door, but finds Preacher's dismembered body parts, and instead flees into the woods.

Leslie returns to the house and is relieved to see Josh's car parked in the driveway. In the living room, she approaches Josh, who appears seated in a chair, but finds that Tor has murdered him too. Tor enters the cabin and incapacitates Leslie before carrying her to his boat at the dock. Tor begins rowing across the lake, but Leslie awakens and knocks him overboard, apparently drowning him, before she swims to shore.

In voice-over narration, Leslie contemplates whether or not the Native American maiden may have pulled Tor to the bottom of the lake to save her. In the final shot of the film, Tor leaps from the water, brandishing a knife.

== Cast ==
- Stacey Logan as Leslie
- Michelle Merchant as Janna McKinney
- Michael Shamus Wiles as Tor
- Kevin Meyer as Josh
- Dale Buckmaster as Preacher
- Debbie Killion as Debbie
- Dean Lewis as Charlie
- Jill Holmes as Denise

== Production ==
=== Development and casting ===
Shortly after graduating from the USC School of Cinematic Arts, Kevin Meyer was approached by his father, documentary filmmaker Ken Meyer, who had been offered to direct a horror film for the Oklahoma-based home media company United Entertainment Pictures, who had previously produced and released Blood Cult (1985). United Entertainment Pictures funded the project with a budget of approximately $40,000, and mandated that the shoot take place within a two-week timeframe. Kevin Meyer's stepmother, Claudia, wrote the screenplay for the film.

To keep production costs low, Kevin recruited several of his classmates from USC to work on the project, among them cinematographer Steven Wacks, and actor Michael Shamus Wiles, the latter of whom had appeared in a student film directed Kevin and filmmaker Jeff Burr. Lead actress Stacey Logan was a recent graduate of Oklahoma City University at the time of her casting, and was performing in touring theater productions.

=== Filming ===
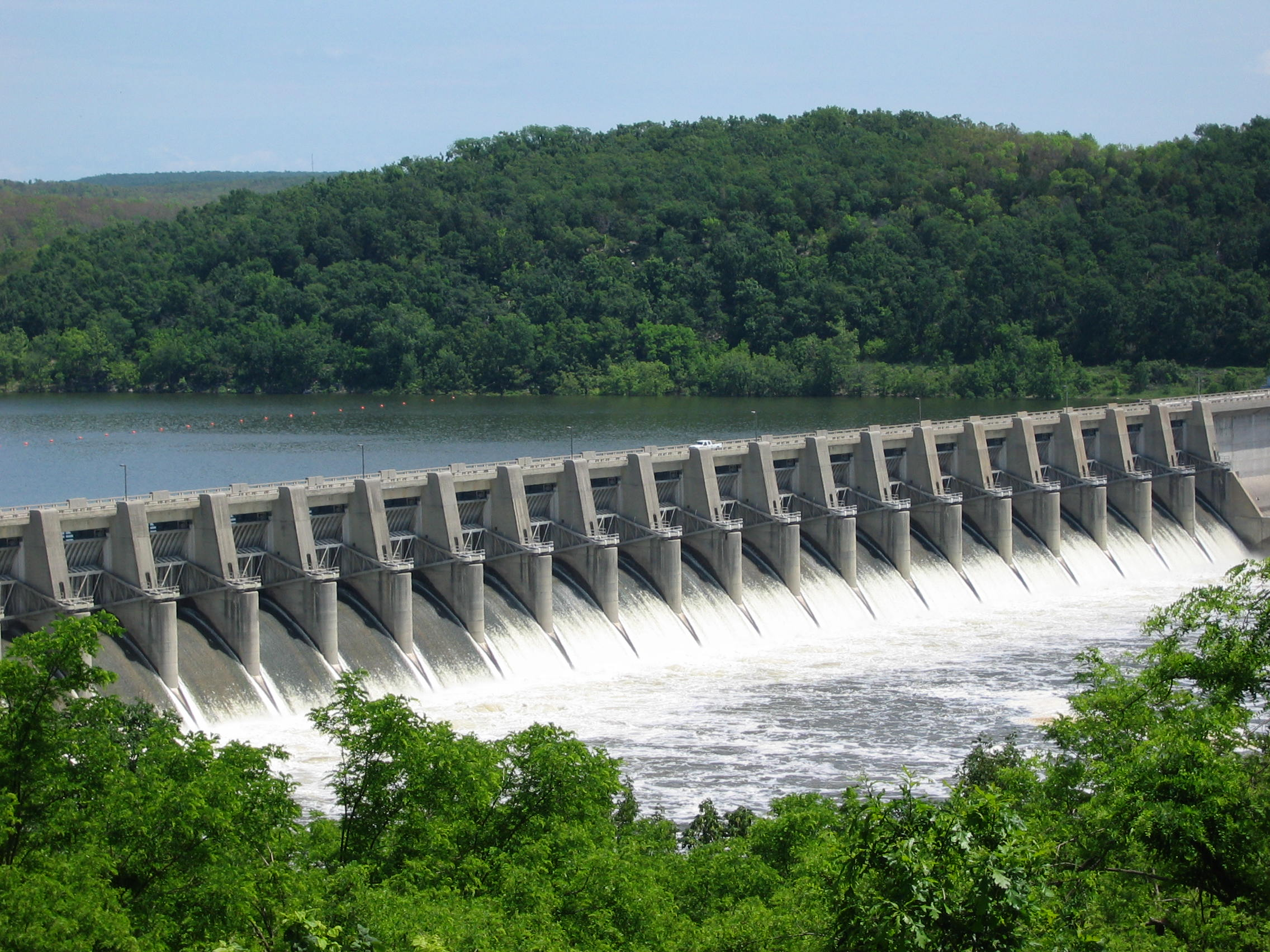
Filming took place near Fort Gibson Dam

Principal photography occurred on location at the Lake Fort Gibson and Fort Gibson Dam in Oklahoma, which stood in for the Tenkiller Lake. Though released directly-to-video, the film was shot on 16 mm film with director Ken Meyer's personal Eclair NPR camera. United Entertainment Pictures's in-house special effects studio, DEFX, designed the gore effects used in the film.

Kevin Meyer, in addition to acting in the film, served as a production coordinator, second unit director, and additional photographer on the project.

=== Post-production ===
The actors' dialogue in the film had to be entirely dubbed in post-production because much of the sound recorded was rendered unusable due to imposing background noise from locusts and cicadas at the filming locations. Actresses Stacey Logan and Michelle Merchant were dubbed by other voice actresses, and were not aware their dialogue in the film had been dubbed until after it was released.

In addition to the dialogue dubbing, the film's production company mandated reshoots to incorporate more gore in the film, including the sequence in which Tor murders Preacher and dismembers his arm.

== Release ==
=== Critical response ===
Paul Petlewski of The Columbus Ledger named the film alongside Killer Party (1986) as "two abysmal turkeys I mention only to warn away potential viewers," adding: "Terror at Tenkiller yearns to be a real slasher film, but is too stupid and technically inept to achieve even that less-than-auspicious status."

The American Genre Film Archive classified the film as "One part relationship drama, one part sleazy slasher, and two-thousand parts bizarre... the greatest slasher-soap-opera ever made in the wilds of Oklahoma," also praising its 8-bit synthesizer score.

Writer Scott Aaron Stine, in The Gorehound's Guide to Splatter Films of the 1980s (2003), was unimpressed by the film, deeming it a "humdrum melodrama" that "finally kicks in with some slasher elements thirty minutes into the tired proceedings, but these are just as lifeless as the rest of the godforsaken film." Author Mark Whitehead, in The Pocket Essentials Slasher Movies (2000), awarded the film a one out of five-star rating, deeming it a "tired and amateurish Friday the 13th clone."

=== Home media ===
Terror at Tenkiller was released on VHS and Betamax by United Home Video on February 17, 1987. A DVD was released in 2004 by VCI Home Video, as a part of a double feature with the 1988 film The Last Slumber Party.

Terror at Tenkiller with a humorous mocking commentary by Mike Nelson, Kevin Murphy and Bill Corbett of Mystery Science Theater 3000 fame was released as a purchasable download (Video on Demand) by RiffTrax on March 28, 2014.

A newly-restored 4K print of the film was screened in Tulsa on October 29, 2021 in celebration of the film's 35th anniversary.

In June 2022, VCI announced that a Blu-ray release featuring the 4K restoration was forthcoming, scheduled for October 25, 2022, though this release never reached fruition. On July 25, 2023, Vinegar Syndrome released a 4K Blu-ray edition of the film with a limited slipcover exclusive to their online store, with a forthcoming street date of August 29, 2023 for a standard edition.

== Sources ==
- Albright, Brian (2008). Wild Beyond Belief!: Interviews with Exploitation Filmmakers of the 1960s and 1970s. Jefferson, North Carolina: McFarland. ISBN 978-0-786-48250-4.
- Stine, Scott Aaron (2003). The Gorehound's Guide to Splatter Films of the 1980s. Jefferson, North Carolina: McFarland. ISBN 978-0-786-41532-8.
- Whitehead, Mark (2000). Slasher Movies. Pocket Essentials: Film. New York City, New York: Pocket Books. ISBN 978-1-903-04727-9.
- Wooley, John (2011). Shot in Oklahoma: A Century of Sooner State Cinema. Oklahoma City, Oklahoma: University of Oklahoma Press. ISBN 978-0-806-18409-8.
