= Side-by-side (graphic) =

Split-screen television presentation format

Side-by-side is a type of split-screen presentation format used on television broadcasts, particularly as a means of continuing to show a view of ongoing live content, whilst simultaneously airing commercials alongside them. Typically, only the audio of the advertising is played.

The practice was initially synonymous with sporting events, with TBS first using the format in a 2000 NASCAR Cup Series race. Motorsport is one of several sports that do not have natural television timeouts; as races are only typically halted for reasons such as accident cleanup and inclement weather, there are no natural locations for commercial breaks besides caution periods — which vary based on race conditions (although under current NASCAR regulations, all races are guaranteed to contain two competition cautions due to their new stage system).

The technology uses a split-screen to show the feed of the live sports event on one side with no audio, while the traditional commercial is placed on the other side, with full audio. Typically, the square used for the commercial is larger and more prominent than that of the event. Sometimes, a small graphic showing the lap count and leaders' names accompanies the square, or the normal ticker is still shown in the layout. side-by-side is used during all national commercial breaks during the race but Side-by-Side is also used during local breaks. Side-By-Side can also be used during the pre-race and the post-race segments. During red flag stoppage conditions, Side-by-Side has been used, but during lengthy delays, such as rain delay, commercials revert to traditional full-screen format.

The concept has since been adopted, at times, in other sports such as golf, as well as football and other non-sports events: although there are natural breaks in football, the content displayed in the live view may consist of behind-the-scenes content.

== By network ==
=== CBS ===
During CBS NFL doubleheaders, if the local market has to cut away from the conclusion of the first game per NFL rules, CBS in most cases may show a split screen of the conclusion of the first game while showing the second game.

=== TBS and NBC ===
TBS debuted the picture-in-picture format at the 2000 UAW-GM Quality 500 NASCAR Cup Series race. NBC followed suit at the 2000 Pennzoil 400, also a NASCAR Cup race, with the branding "No Brakes Coverage". The experiment did not continue in 2001.

=== ESPN and ABC ===
ESPN first used Side-By-Side for an IndyCar Series event on March 19, 2005 during the Toyota Indy 300 at Homestead-Miami Speedway. It was adopted for the entire season outside of Indianapolis. The format was first used for the Indianapolis 500 in 2006.

Starting during the playoffs of the 2011 NASCAR Sprint Cup Series, ESPN began to use a similar feature during the second half of the race, in this case branded as "NASCAR Nonstop".

When Formula One returned to ESPN in 2018, ESPN used Sky Sports F1's coverage, and again used the format for its first broadcast. However, following heavy criticism from fans (at times cutting off the commentators when they were in the middle of sentences), ESPN televised the remaining races of the season with no commercial breaks during live broadcasts, starting from the Bahrain Grand Prix.

=== TNT ===
NASCAR on TNT used a modified split-screen format for their broadcast of the Coke Zero 400 at Daytona branded as "Wide-Open Coverage"; the running order ticker and all on-screen graphics were displayed in an enlarged panel at the button of the screen (race footage was displayed on the top portion of the screen). Commercials were instead shown in a box docked to the lower panel, while race footage continued to be displayed. Many of the commercials were unique and/or specially created for the race broadcast, and lasted up to 1–2 minutes in duration (as opposed to the 15-30 second duration of normal advertisements). Time was still provided for local ad breaks.

The format was used from 2007 through 2012; the 2013 edition of the race discontinued the format.

All Elite Wrestling's TV shows, Dynamite and Rampage, also use side by side for national ad breaks during matches.

=== NBC ===
Beginning in 2009, Versus, now known as NBCSN, became a new television partner with the IndyCar Series. During the race broadcast, they introduced IndyCar Non-Stop with a format and appearance nearly identical to that of Side-By-Side. The format has since been extended in 2013 to NBC/NBCSN's coverage of Formula One (branded as Formula One Non-Stop) until NBC lost the rights to ESPN for 2018, and again in 2015 in the networks' return to NASCAR (branded as NASCAR Non-Stop). In October 2013, subsidiary Golf Channel introduced the format under the title "Playing Through" (referencing a courtesy in golf for groups playing faster to overtake groups playing slower).

NBC used a similar format during commercial breaks for the 2020 Summer Olympics opening ceremony parade of nations.

=== Fox ===
Fox, who started covering NASCAR in 2001, resisted the use of the technology for many years. By about 2010, however, executives began exploring the concept. In 2011, they conducted one experimental commercial break with a split-screen format. Through 2011, Fox has preferred to air traditional, full-screen commercials, and if any action occurs during the break, their policy is to interrupt the commercial and return to the live action (e.g. at the 2013 Auto Club 400, the broadcast was in a commercial break when Clint Bowyer blew an engine and spun, so the feed immediately cut the commercial break right away; at the 2013 Aaron's 499, the feed was in commercial break when a crash occurred on lap 43). FOX returned to using the side-by-side coverage during the 2012 Daytona 500.

During coverage of the 2013 Cotton Bowl Classic, Fox began experimenting with a split-screen commercial format it dubbed the "Double Box", where commercials during a television timeout were displayed in a prominent widescreen box, accompanied by an "L-bar" with sponsor logos relevant to the commercial, and a small window showing continued live footage from the event (such as shots around the stadium and teams in the huddle).

In 2017, Fox introduced a similar presentation for six-second in-game commercials, which are acknowledged and introduced by the commentator.

=== RDS and TSN (Canada) ===
The French Canadian sports channel Réseau des sports (RDS, the French sister network of TSN), which is partially owned by ESPN, adopted a Side-By-Side-styled split-screen for its Formula One race coverage beginning in 2006.

As the network has historically used feeds and commentary from the British F1 rightsholder, TSN began to use a similar format in 2009 after its domestic rights moved from ITV to the BBC (which did not air commercials). If the necessary clean feed is provided during events simulcast from a U.S. network with their own side-by-side feature, TSN will typically use the format with its own advertising.

TSN has also adopted the format on curling telecasts, where the first few stones thrown during an end (which are not usually shown during televised matches in order to accommodate commercial time) are shown in such a split screen view.

=== Outside of sports ===
Side-by-side commercial breaks have sometimes been used by news channels to accommodate live, uninterrupted images of an ongoing or anticipated event. In 2014, Fox extended its aforementioned "Double Box" presentation to its music competition series American Idol, where selected breaks showcased behind-the-scenes camera feeds from the live broadcast.

== Reception ==
Side-By-Side and its similar counterparts have been generally received with positive reviews from viewers, sponsors, and sanctioning bodies. It has been criticized for potentially devaluing advertisements, costing networks revenues, and waning the interest of the advertisers. In addition, it has led to speculation that a similar technology might be implemented for in-game advertisements.

In February 2022 amid the Russian invasion of Ukraine, CNN faced criticism on social media for segueing from footage of air raid sirens ringing over the Ukraine capital of Kyiv, to a split-screen between a live shot of the city and an upbeat Applebee's commercial. In response to the criticism, Applebee's pulled its advertising from the channel.
