= Norma Safford Vela =

American television writer

Norma Safford Vela is an American television writer, director and producer. She produced the ABC series George, starring George Foreman.

== Credits ==
Her credits include What I Like About You, Good Advice, Studio 5-B, The Jersey, The Slap Maxwell Story, The Days and Nights of Molly Dodd, Spenser: For Hire, St. Elsewhere, Almost Home, Life with Bonnie, V.I.P., That's Life, Sabrina, the Teenage Witch, Vanishing Son, George, Designing Women, Davis Rules, and Roseanne.
