= Water stop (sports) =

Stop for sporting event participants to drink water

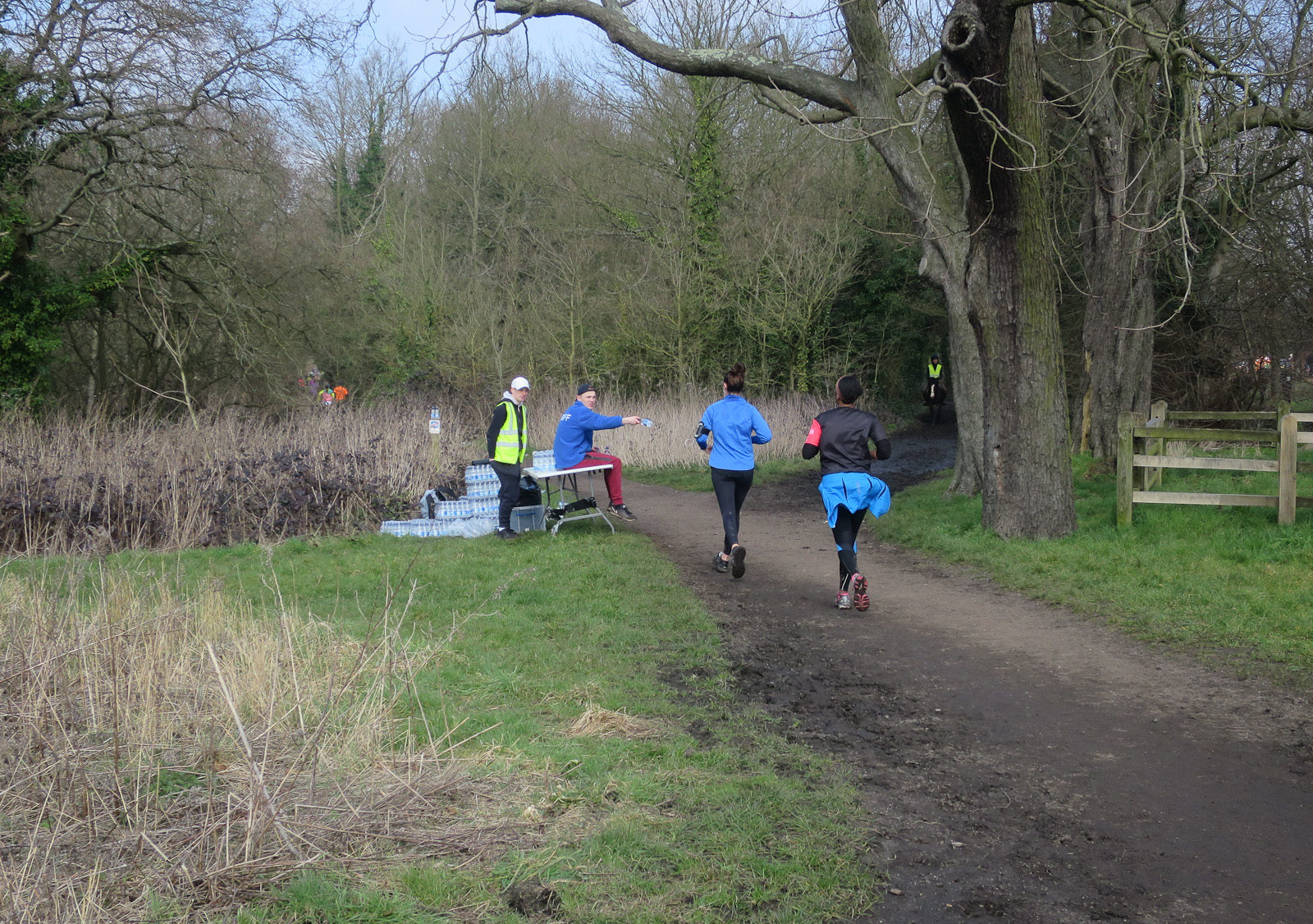
Half marathon water station Hounslow

A water stop is a break and a place to break for drinking water in sports events (sports competitions or training) for some types of sports, such as various long distance types of running (e.g., marathon), cycling, etc. Similarly, a water break is a break to drink water in some sports events held in one place.

Water stops and breaks have become obligatory relatively recently. Before the 1960s, there had been a practice to eliminate water breaks in order "to toughen up boys" (see "Junction Boys" for an example).

Water stops are used to combat interrelated dangers: hyperthermia, dehydration and hyponatremia (low blood level of sodium). Drinking water combats dehydration, while intake of electrolyte solutions (often provided by various sports drinks) combats hyponatremia and its severe form, water intoxication.

Water stops during a marathon are generally spaced between 2 miles and 5 kilometers (3.1 miles) apart, resulting in 8-12 stops. Stopping for 10 seconds per station results in 1-2 minutes of added time, but the loss of stamina due to dehydration would add much more.

Compared to dehydration, hyponatremia is a relatively recently recognized danger, and there are different opinions about how much water to drink at each water stop. Some texts say that thirst is not a reliable indicator of the need in water, while other say that obligatory drinking at every opportunity without real need increases the danger of hyponatremia. Jeff Galloway wrote, "If you hear sloshing in your stomach... you can by-pass that water stop".

== Combat sports ==
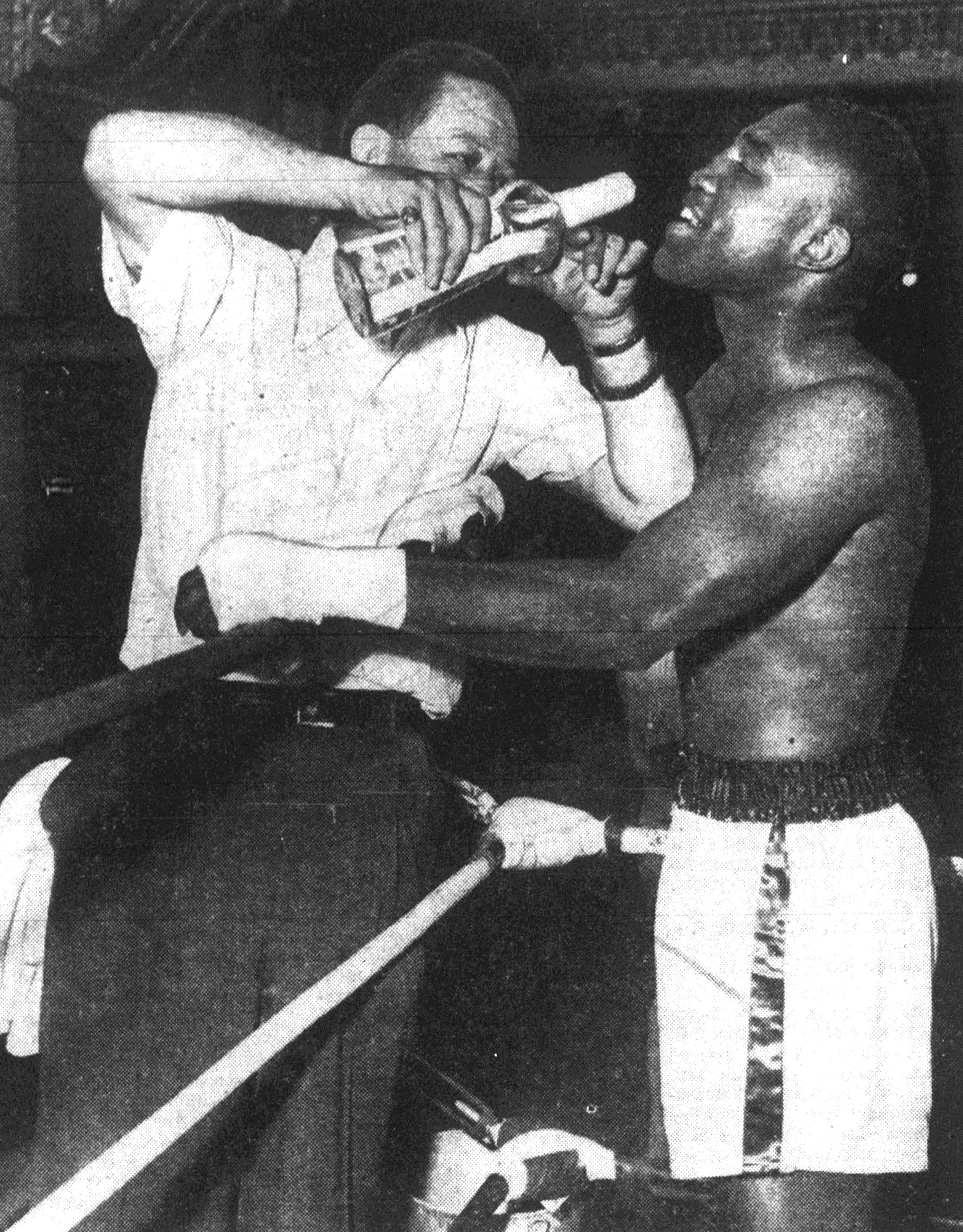
Sammy Cherrin and Jimmy Carter 1951 sipping water during sparring session

In sumo, if a bout goes for many minutes the referee may call a break traditionally called mizu-iri or "water break".

== Team sports ==
Many team sports, such as association football, gaelic sports and rugby union, introduced water breaks into games as part of measures to tackle the spread of COVID-19. Allowing players to drink from their own bottle at regular intervals during games, as opposed to the nearest bottle during incidental stoppages, was said to help prevent the spread of the virus.

=== Association football ===
For the 2026 FIFA World Cup, FIFA introduced mandatory three-minute hydration breaks in each half, scheduled around the 22nd minute regardless of a venue having a retractable roof or its weather conditions. The measure was presented as a player-welfare initiative, particularly given the tournament’s summer schedule across North America, where heat and humidity are expected to vary significantly between host cities.

The decision received negative reactions. Critics argued that making the breaks mandatory in every match could disrupt the natural flow of play, create additional tactical stoppages, and make matches feel more segmented (essentially turning the timing segments into "quarters", similar to sports like basketball); fans in attendance also booed the vast majority of beginnings of those breaks. Some criticism also focused on the possibility that the breaks could create extra advertising opportunities (television timeouts) for broadcasters, although FIFA framed the policy primarily as a health and safety measure.
