= Burning Annie =

2004 American independent comedy film by Van Flesher

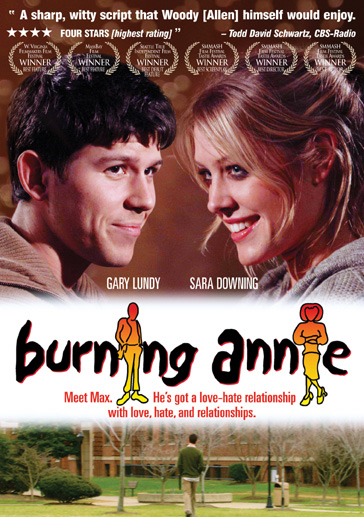
- Cover for LightYear/WB release of Burning Annie on DVD
- Directed by: Van Flesher; Randy Mack (uncredited)
- Written by: Zack Ordynans; Randy Mack (uncredited)
- Produced by: Randy Mack
- Starring: Gary Lundy; Sara Downing; Kim Murphy; Brian Klugman; Jay Paulson; Rini Bell; Todd Duffey; Kathleen Rose Perkins
- Cinematography: Stephan Schultze
- Edited by: Randy Mack
- Music by: Dean Harada
- Distributed by: Warner Bros. Lightyear Entertainment
- Release dates: October 9, 2003 (Hamptons International Film Festival); February 7, 2007 (United States); May 15, 2017 (Worldwide)
- Running time: 95 minutes
- Country: United States
- Language: English

Burning Annie is an 2003 American independent comedy film starring Gary Lundy, Sara Downing, Kim Murphy, Brian Klugman, Jay Paulson, Rini Bell, Todd Duffey, and Kathleen Rose Perkins. It is the directorial debut of Van Flesher. The film was produced by Randy Mack of Armak Productions and in 2007 was distributed by Lightyear Entertainment via Warner Bros. In 2017 it was re-distributed by the filmmakers through Sundance Institute's Creative Distribution Initiative.

== Plot ==
A dysfunctional romantic comedy about Max, a college student in 1998 who's obsessed with Woody Allen's film Annie Hall. He believes the film holds all the answers to life, including the futility of romance. Just as he begins to suspect the film might actually be ruining his life, he meets Julie, a young woman who might be the modern day equivalent of Annie Hall herself, and goes into a romantic tailspin.

== Cast ==
- Gary Lundy as Max
- Sara Downing as Julie
- Kim Murphy as Beth (as Kim Murphy Zandell)
- Brian Klugman as Charles
- Jay Paulson as Sam
- Rini Bell as Amanda
- Todd Duffey as Tommy
- Kathleen Rose Perkins as Jen
- David Hall as Andy
- Jason Risner as Scott
- Carrie Freedle as Sara

== Release ==
After premiering at the Hamptons International Film Festival in 2003, the film spent three years on the film festival circuit, playing as a work-in-progress. It was eventually released by Lightyear Entertainment. Its theatrical run began February 7, 2007 at the Two Boots/Pioneer Theater in East Village, Manhattan, New York City, and it was released on DVD was on March 20, 2007. In 2017 the filmmakers re-acquired the rights to the film and re-released it on HD (high-definition) streaming platforms in dozens of countries, via the Sundance Institute's Creative Distribution Initiative.

== Awards and honors ==
2004 MassBay Film Festival (Worcester, MA.)

- Won: Best Feature

2004 West Virginia Filmmakers Film Festival

- Won: Best Feature

2004 Strictly Midwestern Movies and Short Hits (SMMASH)

- Won: Best Director
- Won: Best Screenplay
- Won: Best Actor
- Nominated: Best Supporting Actor
- Nominated: Best Actress
- Nominated: Best Feature
- Nominated: Audience Award

2005 Seattle's True Independent Film Festival (STIFF)

- Won: Best Debut Feature
- Won: Best Use of a Donnie Darko Cast Member

== General sources ==
- Official website
- Burning Annie at IMDb
- http://movies.nytimes.com/2007/02/07/movies/07burn.html
- https://www.variety.com/review/VE1117922407.html
- https://nymag.com/movies/listings/rv_46896.htm
- tvguide.com
- villagevoice.com
- https://www.moviemaker.com/archives/series/how_they_did_it/burning-annie-found-self-distribution-after-a-decade-of-catastrophes
- https://seligfilmnews.com/burning-annie-interviews-with-randy-mack-van-flesher-and-gary-lundy/
