= The Last Slumber Party =

- VHS artwork
- Directed by: Stephen Tyler
- Written by: Stephen Tyler; Jim Taylor
- Starring: Jan Jensen; Nancy Meyer; Joann Whitley
- Cinematography: Georges Cardona
- Edited by: Jill Clark; Paul McFarlane
- Music by: John Brennan; Danilo Bridgens; Firstryke
- Distributed by: United Home Video
- Release date: 1988
- Running time: 72 minutes
- Country: United States
- Language: English

The Last Slumber Party is a 1988 American slasher film directed by Stephen Tyler and starring Jan Jensen, Nancy Meyer, and Joann Whitley.

== Plot ==
On the last day of school before summer vacation, three girls, Chris, Linda, and Tracy, plan a slumber party for later that day. Their boyfriends, Billy, Scott, and Tommy, bully class nerd Science. Meanwhile, at the hospital where Chris’ father works, a mental patient, Mr Randles, escapes after stealing a doctor’s scrubs and a scalpel. He kills a nurse and orderly at the nearby bus stop. Sneaking over to the nearby neighborhood, he scares one of the girls’ classmates (which was shown at the beginning of the film).

At the girls’ slumber party, they hear a news report about the murders. They call their boyfriends, expressing interest in setting Scott up with Linda. Their boyfriends scare them by dressing up in monster masks, then go to the local gas station for beer. Science is there, and they bully him again.

The girls are surprised by Tommy sneaking in through an upstairs window, unknowingly avoiding Mr Randles. He enters the house through the open window, hiding in the room as Chris and Tommy prepare to have sex. Chris takes a shower, and Tommy is killed by Mr Randles. Chris enters the bedroom looking for Tommy, not knowing his body was hidden in the closet.

Tracy’s boyfriend Billy arrives, and the two make out in the bedroom. Tracy leaves to get drugs, and Science shows up. Billy helps him into the house, and Science kills him with a scalpel, dumping his body out the window. The girls find Science’s scalpel, but assume it was a prank by their boyfriends. Chris has a nightmare where she is attacked by her friends and murdered by her mother. Linda goes to sleep, and Science tries attacking her, but Randles slits his throat, later murdering Tracy. Scott sneaks into the house, and Chris finds Linda stabbed in the back. Chris tries calling the police, but the phone lines have been cut. She goes upstairs, finding Tracy’s body, as well as her mother’s. Grabbing a knife from the kitchen, she is surprised by the dying Linda, who urges her to go for help. Chris thinks she hears Mr Randles sneaking up on her, but she ends up stabbing Scott instead. Mr Randles confronts Chris, who stabs him in the chest before fainting.

In the morning, Dr Sickler returns home, but is called away when a nurse informs him of Randles’ escape. He goes back to the hospital, where Randles kills him in an elevator. Chris finds Dr Sickler’s body in the pool, and Mr Randles slits her throat.

It turns out everything that happened was a nightmare Chris was having. She and Tracy arrive at Linda’s house for the slumber party, but Mr Randles breaks in and murders Linda.

== Cast ==
- Jan Jensen as Chris
- Nancy Meyer as Tracy
- Joann Whitley as Linda
- Danny David as Tommy
- Lance Descourez as Billy
- Paul Amend as Scott
- David Whitley as Dr. Sickler
- Stephen Tyler as the Maniac

== Release ==
The Last Slumber Party, made in 1984 on a two-week shooting schedule in suburban New Orleans, was released directly-to-video in 1988 by United Home Video. VCI Entertainment released the film on DVD in 2004 as part of a double feature with Terror at Tenkiller (1986). In 2024, the American Genre Film Archive (AFGA) released the film for the first time on Blu-ray.

== Reception and legacy ==
In his 2015 book The Gorehound's Guide to Splatter Films of the 1980s, writer Scott Aaron Stine compared the film negatively to The Slumber Party Massacre (1982), deeming it an ineffective "rehash". In the same year, journalist Erik Piepenburg of The New York Times noted similarities between both films as well, but profiled the film in an article on underrated "final girls" in slasher films.

The film was spoofed by RiffTrax, consisting of Mystery Science Theater 3000 alumni Bill Corbett, Michael J. Nelson and Kevin Murphy, on July 18, 2014.

== See also ==
- Postmodern horror
- 1988 in film
- 1984 in film
