= George (1993 TV series) =

- Created by: Norma Safford Vela
- Starring: George Foreman; Sheryl Lee Ralph; LáCrystal Cooke; Larry Gilliard Jr. Anne Haney; Pablo Irlando; Tony T. Johnson; Cleandré Norman; Lauren Robinson; Doniell Spencer
- Composer: Alan Ett
- Country of origin: United States
- Original language: English
- No. of seasons: 1
- No. of episodes: 9 (list of episodes)

Production
- Camera setup: Multi-camera
- Running time: 30 minutes
- Production companies: ELP Communications; Katie Face Productions; Envy Productions; Columbia Pictures Television

Original release
- Network: ABC
- Release: November 5, 1993 – January 19, 1994

George is an American sitcom that aired from November 5, 1993, to January 19, 1994. Tony Danza was co-producer of the series.

== Premise ==
George Foreman plays a retired boxer who runs an after-school program for troubled kids.

== Cast ==
- George Foreman as George Foster
- Sheryl Lee Ralph as Maggie Foster, George's wife
- LáCrystal Cooke as Vanessa
- Larry Gilliard Jr. as Lathan Basmore
- Anne Haney as Juanita
- Pablo Irlando as Mauricio Butler
- Tony T. Johnson as "Bubba" Foster, George & Maggie's son
- Cleandré Norman as Daniel Hickok
- Lauren Robinson as "Vee" Foster, George & Maggie's daughter
- Doniell Spencer as Shasta

== Episodes ==
No.	Title	Directed by	Written by	Original release date	Viewers (millions)
1	"Pilot"	Asaad Kelada	Norma Safford Vela	November 5, 1993	22.2
George confronts the bad attitudes of troubled kids.
2	"2 Hip 2 Work"	Asaad Kelada	Norma Safford Vela	November 6, 1993	9.4
To finance the TKO Club the kids start a t-shirt business, but Lathan (Lawrence Gilliard, Jr.) is pocketing a little extra for himself.
3	"Requiem for a Lightweight"	Asaad Kelada	Phil Kellard & Tom Moore	November 13, 1993	8.9
Daniel (Cleandre Norman) intends to become a professional fighter after he wins a fight at school.
4	"One Joe at a Time"	Asaad Kelada	Norma Safford Vela & Mark Waxman	November 20, 1993	7.4
A disgruntled tenant demands that George close the TKO Club, claiming that the kids are hurting his business.
5	"Nobody Up There Likes Me"	Asaad Kelada	Norma Safford Vela	December 22, 1993	16.1
Paul Eiding guest stars
6	"Society Girl"	Asaad Kelada	Norma Safford Vela	December 29, 1993	17.2
Shasta (Doniell Spencer) deals with her absent father's return.
7	"Homeboy's Where the Heart Is"	Asaad Kelada	Norma Safford Vela	January 5, 1994	16.9
George makes Lathan a security guard after he breaks into a house. Troy Evans and Mother Love guest star.
8	"Rapmasta Shasta"	Asaad Kelada	Norma Safford Vela and Cathryn Michon	January 12, 1994	15.5
Maggie (Sheryl Lee Ralph) enters Shasta into a rap contest.
9	"Man of the Year"	Asaad Kelada	Norma Safford Vela	January 19, 1994	17.5
George goes to a banquet to receive an award. Juanita (Anne Haney) and the kids watch horror movies. Series finale.
