= Rini Bell =

American actress (born 1981)

- Born: Honorine Bell; March 21, 1981 (age 45); Rome, Italy
- Occupation: Actress
- Years active: 1997-present
- Father: Battle Bell

Honorine Bell (born March 21, 1981) is an American actress.

== Early years ==
Born in Rome, Italy, Bell was raised in Europe for much of her childhood before moving to New Orleans, Louisiana. She speaks English, French, and Spanish.

== Career ==
Bell has been in movies such as Ghost World, The Terminal, Bring It On, Road Trip, Baja Beach Bums, and Jarhead. She had a recurring role on Gilmore Girls playing Lulu, a local third grade teacher at the Stars Hollow Elementary School and Kirk Gleason's girlfriend.

She has also done voice acting, being in the PSP game Jeanne d'Arc. She also voiced roles in four episodes of the animated television series King of the Hill.

== Filmography ==
=== Film ===
Year	Title	Role	Notes
1997	Arresting Gina	Alice	
2000	Road Trip	Carla	
2000	Bring It On	Kasey	
2001	Ghost World	Graduation Speaker	
2002	The Romantic	Woman #1	Short film
2003	As Virgins Fall	Jodi Horn	
2004	Burning Annie	Amanda	
2004	The Terminal	Nadia	
2005	Jarhead	Swoff's Sister	
2007	Cash Cow	The Publicist	Short film
2008	The Thirst: Blood War	Ashley	
2009	Baja Beach Bums	Unis	
2012	A Girl, a Guy, a Space Helmet	Zspace Fellow #2	

=== Television ===
Year	Title	Role	Notes
1997	The Weird Al Show	Got Milk Girl	"Mining Accident"
2001	Reba	Luanne	"The Steaks Are High"
2002	So Little Time	Tanya	"Larrypalooza"
2003-2007	Gilmore Girls	Lulu	Recurring role
2007	Celebrity Deathmatch	Jessica Simpson	"Where's Lohan?"
2007-2009	King of the Hill	Various (voice)	Recurring role
2009	The Goode Family	(voice)	"Pilot", "Graffiti in Greenville"
2016	Gilmore Girls: A Year in the Life	Lulu	Cameo

=== Video games ===
Year	Title	Role	Notes
2007	Jeanne d'Arc	Liane	
2021	Call of Duty: Vanguard	Beatrice Mercier	
