= Jim Dent (author) =

American sportswriter (born 1953)

Harry James Dent (born 1953) is an American author and sportswriter.

== Biography ==
Dent graduated from Southern Methodist University and worked for several newspapers and sport magazines. He covered the Dallas Cowboys of the National Football League (NFL) as a sportswriter for 11 years in the 1980s and 1990s.

In 1995, Dent wrote the book King of the Cowboys: The Life and Times of Jerry Jones, about Cowboys owner Jerry Jones. He wrote the 2000 book The Junction Boys: How Ten Days in Hell with Bear Bryant Forged a Championship Team, a New York Times best-selling book about Bear Bryant's Junction Boys. He wrote the 2008 book Twelve Mighty Orphans: The Inspiring True Story of the Mighty Mites Who Ruled Texas Football, and the 2014 book The Kids Got It Right: How the Texas All-Stars Kicked Down Racial Walls.

In 2001, Dent's book The Undefeated: The Oklahoma Sooners and the Greatest Winning Streak in College Football, was published. The book is an account of the Oklahoma Sooners' 47-game winning streak from 1954 to 1957, which as of 2022 remains the longest winning streak in college football history. Upon release, the book was criticized by many former Oklahoma football players, who were incensed by his depiction of Oklahoma head coach Bud Wilkinson as a cheater and a philandering alcoholic. Dent's critics included quarterback Jimmy Harris and halfback Jakie Sandefer, who respectively described Dent's portrayal of Wilkinson as "a lot of fiction" and "a bunch of lies." Dent nonetheless defended his account, saying "Anybody who says my book is fiction is a first-class liar."

In 2002, ESPN released The Junction Boys, a made-for-television movie based on Dent's work. The 2021 film 12 Mighty Orphans, with Luke Wilson, Martin Sheen and Robert Duvall, was adapted from Dent's work. As of 2015, Dent was writing his autobiography, entitled Last Call.

In 2003, Dent was sentenced to eight years in prison under a plea agreement with Brazos County, Texas, prosecutors for violating his drunk driving probation. In 2015, Dent was sentenced to ten years in prison after jumping bail following his 10th conviction for drunk driving. Dent's drunk driving incidents did not cause any accidents or injuries. While in prison, Dent contracted COVID-19.
