= Todd Duffey =

American actor

- Born: Robert Gordon Duffey; April 9, 1974 (age 52); Raleigh, North Carolina, U.S.
- Occupation: Actor
- Years active: 1990–present

Todd Duffey (born Robert Gordon Duffey; April 9, 1974) is an American actor. He was born in Raleigh, North Carolina and grew up in Texas where he studied and performed in theater.

== Career ==
Duffey is best known for his role as Brian, the Chotchkie's waiter in the 1999 comedy Office Space. Among his other projects, he appeared in a recurring role in 2001 in Buffy the Vampire Slayer.

== Filmography ==
=== Film ===
- Across Five Aprils (1990) as Jethro Creighton
- In the Name of Love: A Texas Tragedy (1995) as Davey Coombs
- Carried Away (1996) as Young Joseph
- Office Space (1999) as Brian
- The Black Rose (2000) as Kyle
- Buttleman (2003) as Harold's Boss
- Barney: Let's Go to the Zoo (2001) as Scooter McNutty
- Burning Annie (2004) as Tommy
- The SpongeBob SquarePants Movie (2004) as Concession Guy (voice)
- Slaughterhouse of the Rising Sun (2005) as Robert Lewis
- Hollywood Kills (2006) as Ken Vincent
- The Last Lovecraft: Relic of Cthulhu (2009) as Cult member #1
- Death Inc. (2011) as Plumber Jim
- God's Country (2012) as Adam
- Steel Cherry (2012) as Marvin Steel

=== Television ===
- Walker, Texas Ranger (1 episode, 1995) as Paul Kelly Moore
- Barney & Friends (47 episodes, 1997–2000) as Scooter McNutty
- ER (1 episode, 2000) as Mitch
- Buffy the Vampire Slayer (6 episodes, 2001) as Murk
- The Drew Carey Show (1 episode, 2002) as Prom DJ
- George Lopez (1 episode, 2003) as Teenage Boy
- Charmed (1 episode, 2003) as Satyr
- The O'Keefes (1 episode) as Beer Guy
- That '70s Show (1 episode, 2004) as Guy #2

=== Video game ===
- Tony Hawk's Project 8 (2006) (as Robert Duffey)

== Recognition ==
In 1991, Duffey received a Western Heritage Award from the National Cowboy Museum for his starring role as Jethro Creighton in the 1990 film Across Five Aprils adapted from the Irene Hunt novel of the same name.
