= 12 Mighty Orphans =

- Theatrical release poster
- Directed by: Ty Roberts
- Screenplay by: Ty Roberts; Lane Garrison; Kevin Meyer
- Based on: Twelve Mighty Orphans: The Inspiring True Story of the Mighty Mites Who Ruled Texas Football by Jim Dent
- Produced by: Houston Hill; Angelique De Luca; Michael De Luca; Brinton Bryan
- Starring: Luke Wilson; Vinessa Shaw; Wayne Knight; Jake Austin Walker; Jacob Lofland; Levi Dylan; Robert Duvall; Martin Sheen
- Cinematography: David McFarland
- Edited by: James K. Crouch
- Music by: Mark Orton
- Production companies: Greenbelt Films; Michael De Luca Productions; Santa Rita Film Co.; 12 Productions
- Distributed by: Sony Pictures Classics
- Release date: June 11, 2021
- Running time: 118 minutes
- Country: United States
- Language: English
- Box office: $5.6 million

12 Mighty Orphans is a 2021 American sports film which was directed by Ty Roberts from a screenplay by Roberts, Lane Garrison and Kevin Meyer. It is based upon the non-fiction book Twelve Mighty Orphans: The Inspiring True Story of the Mighty Mites Who Ruled Texas Football by Jim Dent. The book is based on the Masonic School for Orphans in Fort Worth, Texas.

The film stars Luke Wilson, Vinessa Shaw, Wayne Knight, Jake Austin Walker, Jacob Lofland, Levi Dylan, Robert Duvall and Martin Sheen. The film was released in the United States on June 11, 2021 by Sony Pictures Classics. It received mixed reviews from critics.

== Plot ==
During the Great Depression, war veteran and former orphan Rusty Russell relocates with his wife and daughter to Fort Worth, Texas, to teach math and science at the Masonic Home for Orphans. He also takes on the role of football coach. Upon arrival, Rusty discovers that the orphanage is run by the abusive Warden Frank Wynn, who exploits the boys for child labor in his personal printing press. The boys, lacking proper education and discipline, are subjected to harsh conditions and have little hope for the future.

Determined to make a difference, Rusty, with the support of the home's compassionate physician, Doc Hall, decides to form a football team. Recognizing the boys' physical limitations, he devises innovative strategies, including a spread offense, to level the playing field. Despite lacking basic equipment and playing barefoot, the team, dubbed the "Mighty Mites," begins to improve, instilling a sense of purpose and unity among the players.

Facing numerous challenges, including resistance from Warden Wynn and skepticism from the community, the Mighty Mites persevere. They gain attention for their unique playing style and resilience, eventually catching the interest of President Franklin D. Roosevelt. As the team advances toward the Texas state championships, they confront personal and institutional obstacles that test their determination and spirit.

In the championship game, the Mighty Mites face a formidable opponent. Despite their efforts and tactics, in the end they lost the game.

== Cast ==
- Luke Wilson as Rusty Russell
- Martin Sheen as Doc E.P. Hall
- Robert Duvall as Mason Hawk
- Vinessa Shaw as Juanita Russell
- Wayne Knight as Frank Wynn
- Jake Austin Walker as Hardy Brown
- Treat Williams as Amon Carter
- Carlson Young as Annie
- Natasha Bassett as Opal
- Jacob Lofland as Snoggs
- Lane Garrison as Luther
- Scott Haze as Rodney Kidd
- Kelly Frye as Mary Jane
- Sampley Barinaga as Chicken
- Levi Dylan as Fairbanks
- Slade Monroe as Wheatie
- Heath Freeman as Coach Cox
- Lucy Faust as Wanda

== Production ==
Principal photography initially took place for seven weeks from October 7 to November 25, 2019 in Weatherford, Cleburne, and Fort Worth, Texas. It is based on the non fiction book of the same name by Jim Dent. Alice Eve was initially attached to the project early in the development, but dropped out for unknown reasons shortly afterwards.

== Release ==
Sony Pictures Classics acquired worldwide distribution rights to the film in January 2021, five months pending the official release. It was released in a limited release on June 11, 2021 which was followed by a wide expansion one week later on June 18, 2021. The film was released theatrically in the United Kingdom three months later on September 17, 2021.

== Reception ==
=== Box office ===
In its opening weekend the film made $251,569 from 132 theatres. It expanded to 1,047 theatres the following weekend, making an estimated $870,000 and finishing in eighth place at the box office.

=== Critical response ===
On the review aggregator website Rotten Tomatoes, the film holds an approval rating of 63% based on 89 reviews with an average rating of 6/10. The site’s critics consensus reads: "12 Mighty Orphans will rouse faithful fans of old fashioned inspirational sports dramas, but the target audience has seen this sort of thing done more effectively before." On Metacritic, the film has a weighted average score of 44 out of 100 based reviews from 14 critics, indicating "mixed or average" reviews. Audiences surveyed by PostTrak gave the film an 80% positive score, with 75% saying they would definitely recommend it.

Peter Debruge of Variety called it "Square but satisfying" and said "sometimes they do make ‘em like they used to."
