= Sara Downing =

American actress

- Born: Sara Nicole Downing; April 26, 1979 (age 47); Washington, D.C., United States
- Occupation: Actress
- Years active: 1998–present

Sara Nicole Downing (born April 26, 1979) is an American actress best known for her starring role as Jane Cahill in the 2001 television series Dead Last.

== Filmography ==
=== Film ===
Year	Title	Role	Notes
1999	Tumbleweeds	Rachel Riley	
1999	Never Been Kissed	Billy's Prom Date	
2001	The Forsaken	Julie	
2002	Hard Cash	Paige	
2002	Wishcraft	Desiree	
2003	Rats	Samantha / Jennifer	
2004	Toolbox Murders	Saffron Kirby	
2004	Burning Annie	Julie	
2008	The Grift	Kate Bender / Kate's Mother	
2009	Endless Bummer	Ginger Mooney	
2010	The Devil Inside	Kendra	
2012	Art of Submission	Julia	

=== Television ===
Year	Title	Role	Notes
1998	Boy Meets World	Camryn	Episode: "Friendly Persuasion"
1998	The Army Show	Lesbian Poet	Episode: "Eddie Goes to College"
1999	Sorority	Janine	TV film
2000	Undressed	Terry	TV series
2000	Titus	Tiffany	Episode: "The Break-Up"
2000	Roswell	Courtney Banks	Recurring role (6 episodes)
2001	Dead Last	Jane Cahill	(13 episodes)
2002	Smallville	Jessie Brooks	Episode: "Red"
2006	CSI: Miami	Kelly Simms	Episode: "Dead Air"
2006	Charmed	Mikelle	Episode: "The Jung and the Restless"
2006	South of Nowhere	Monica	Episode: "Love Child and Videotape"
