= The Junction Boys (film) =

2002 television film

- Based on: The Junction Boys by Jim Dent
- Written by: Mike Robe
- Directed by: Mike Robe
- Starring: Tom Berenger
- Music by: Steve Dorff
- Country of origin: United States
- Original language: English

Production
- Executive producers: Orly Adelson; John H. Williams; James Dalthorp
- Producer: Michael O. Gallant
- Cinematography: Steve Andrich
- Editor: Sabrina Plisco
- Running time: 93 minutes
- Production company: Orly Adelson Productions

Original release
- Network: ESPN
- Release: December 14, 2002

The Junction Boys is a 2002 American sports drama television film written and directed by Mike Robe, based on sportswriter Jim Dent's 2001 book. It is about the Junction Boys, the "survivors" of Texas A&M Aggies football coach Paul "Bear" Bryant's brutal 10-day summer camp in Junction, Texas, beginning September 1, 1954. The film stars Tom Berenger as Bryant. It aired on ESPN on December 14, 2002.

== Cast ==
- Tom Berenger as Bear Bryant
- Fletcher Humphrys as Skeet Keeler
- Ryan Kwanten as Claude Gearheart
- Bernard Curry as Johnny Haynes
- Nick Tate as Smokey Harper
- Ewen Leslie as Luke Mason
- Luke Ford as Perch
- Josef Ber as Pine
- Ryan Johnson as Mike Hess
- Russell Kiefel as Doake Gearheart
- Mark Lee as Coach Gilmore
- Andy Anderson as Coach Betch
- Martin Grelis as Recruiting Coach
- James Smillie as Dwayne Hess
- Matthew Edgerton as Jimmy Nubbs

== Production ==
Filming took place in Sydney, Australia, for budgetary reasons. Except for the American Berenger, the cast members were Australian, and were coached by a Texas-born dialect coach to use correct Texan accents. To bypass the differences between American and Australian rules football, the filmmakers recruited players from American football clubs in Australia for the football scenes.
