= Junction Boys =

Group of Texas A&M Aggies football players

The Junction Boys were the "survivors" of Texas A&M Aggies football coach Bear Bryant's brutal 10-day summer camp in Junction, Texas, beginning September 1, 1954. The ordeal became the subject of a 2001 book by Jim Dent, The Junction Boys, and a television movie with the same title produced by ESPN, starring Tom Berenger as Bryant.

== The camp ==
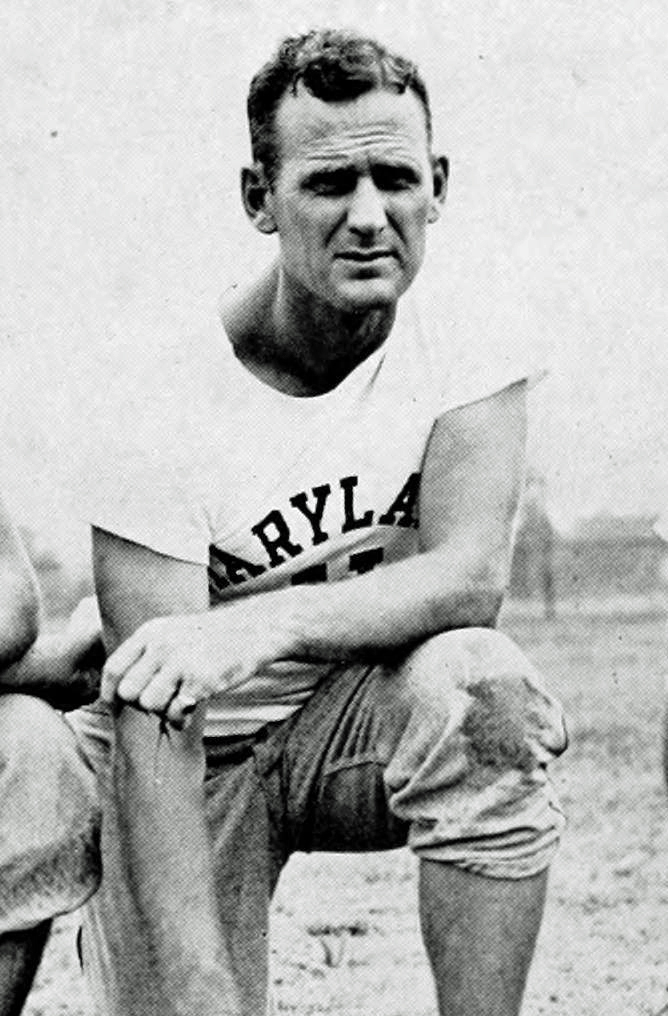
Bear Bryant in 1945, during his time coaching Maryland

Texas A&M University hired Bear Bryant as head football coach in 1954, replacing former coach Raymond George. Bryant arrived in College Station on February 8, 1954, and began molding the team. He felt that many of the players on the team were weak and not properly trained or coached, and needed a camp away from the distractions on campus. He therefore arranged for a camp to be held in the small Hill Country town of Junction, where Texas A&M had a 411-acre (1.7-km^{2}) adjunct campus (now the Texas Tech University Center at Junction).

At the time of the camp, the Hill Country was experiencing a severe heat wave. It was also in the midst of the worst drought in the recorded history of the region, which had already lasted four years and would last another two after the camp. According to the National Climatic Data Center, all 10 days of the camp took place in high temperatures, with a few days topping 100 °F (38 °C).

Practices began before dawn and usually lasted all day, with meetings in the evening until 11pm. The oppressive heat combined with the brutal practice schedule was too much for many of the players. Each day, fewer and fewer players reported for practice, as many quit the team from illness or disgust. The situation was compounded by Bryant's refusal to allow water breaks. This practice, now widely recognized as dangerous, was at the time commonly employed by coaches at all levels in an attempt to "toughen up" their players. The only relief provided to the players were two towels soaked in cold water; one towel was shared by the offensive players, and one by the defense. One of the Junction Boys, future NFL coach Jack Pardee, later said in an interview that some players sweated away 10% of their body weight.

== List of "survivors" ==
By the end of the 10-day camp, only a fraction of those who started were left. The list of "survivors" varies from 27 to 39. The 39 Junction Boys listed by writer Jim Dent were:

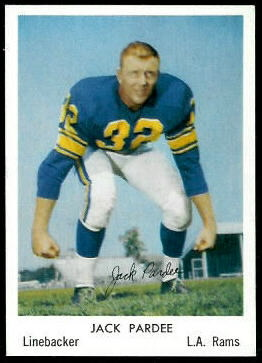
Jack Pardee during his time playing for the Los Angeles Rams

- Ray Barrett - G, 5'9", 195 lbs., Senior from San Angelo, Texas
- Darrell Brown - T, 6'1", 190 lbs., Sophomore from Dayton, Texas (died October 15, 2011)
- James Burkhart - G, 6'1", 185 lbs., Sophomore from Hamlin, Texas
- Donald Bullock - HB, 5'11", 165 lbs., Sophomore from Orange, Texas
- Henry Clark - T, 6'2", 205 lbs., Junior from Mesquite, Texas
- Bob Easley - FB, 5'11", 190 lbs., Junior from Houston, Texas
- Dennis Goehring - G, 5'11", 185 lbs., Sophomore from San Marcos, Texas
- Billy Granberry - FB, 5'7", 155 lbs., Sophomore from Beeville, Texas
- Lloyd Hale - C, 5'10", 190 lbs., Sophomore from Iraan, Texas (died April 15, 2014)
- Charles Hall - HB, 5'10", 185 lbs., Senior from Dallas, Texas
- Eddie Joe Ham - C, 5'10", 165 lbs., Senior from Grapeland, Texas (died August 29, 1995)
- Gene Henderson - QB, 6'1", 175 lbs., Junior from Sonora, Texas
- Billy Huddleston - HB, 5'9", 165 lbs., Junior from Iraan, Texas (died July 31, 2019)
- George Johnson - T, 6'3", 200 lbs., Junior from Ellisville, Mississippi (died October 25, 2005)
- Don Kachtik - FB, 6'1", 185 lbs., Senior from Rio Hondo, Texas
- Bobby D. Keith - HB, 6'0", 175 lbs., Sophomore from Breckenridge, Texas
- Paul Kennon - E, 6'1", 185 lbs., Senior from Shreveport, Louisiana
- Elwood Kettler - QB, 6'0", 165 lbs., Senior from Brenham, Texas
- Bobby Lockett - T, 6'3", 190 lbs., Sophomore from Breckenridge, Texas
- Billy McGowan - E, 6'1", 180 lbs., Senior from Silsbee, Texas
- Russell Moake - C, 6'3", 215 lbs., Sophomore from Deer Park, Texas
- Norbert Ohlendorf - T, 6'3", 200 lbs., Senior from Lockhart, Texas
- Jack Pardee - FB, 6'2", 200 lbs., Sophomore from Christoval, Texas (died April 1, 2013)
- Dee Powell - T, 6'1", 210 lbs., Senior from Lockhart, Texas
- Donald Robbins - E, 6'1", 188 lbs., Junior from Breckenridge, Texas (died September 18, 2020)
- Joe Schero - HB, 6'0", 175 lbs., Senior from San Antonio, Texas
- Bill Schroder - T, 6'1", 200 lbs., Senior from Lockhart, Texas
- Charles Scott - QB, 5'8", 160 lbs., Sophomore from Alexandria, Louisiana
- Bennie Sinclair - E, 6'2", 195 lbs., Senior from Mineola, Texas
- Gene Stallings - E, 6'1", 165 lbs., Sophomore from Paris, Texas
- Troy Summerlin - C, 5'8", 145 lbs., Sophomore from Shreveport, Louisiana
- Marvin Tate - G, 6'0", 175 lbs., Senior from Abilene, Texas (died December 7, 2023)
- Sid Theriot - G, 5'10", 195 lbs., Senior from Gibson, Louisiana
- Richard Vick - FB, 6'1", 185 lbs., Senior from Beaumont, Texas (died January 25, 2020)
- Don Watson - HB, 5'11", 155 lbs., Sophomore from Franklin, Texas (died January 7, 2020)
- Lawrence Winkler - T, 6'0", 225 lbs., Senior from Temple, Texas
- Joseph Rowell Sr.- G, 6'2", 220 lbs., Junior from Citronelle, Alabama (died February 1, 2010)
- Herb Wolf - C, 5'11", 185 lbs., Junior from Houston, Texas
- Nick Tyson- WR, 6'1", 181 lbs., Junior from Norman, Oklahoma

Over 100 players often have been depicted as making the trip to Junction, but all the survivors insist that the number was actually smaller. Although Bryant started out with over 100 players on the roster, many had already quit or been cut by the time of the Junction camp.

== Aftermath ==
Bryant's methods did not translate into immediate success on the field. During the 1954 season, Texas A&M played 10 games, from September 18 till November 25, losing nine of them. It was the only losing season in Bryant's 38 years as a head coach. The Aggies' only victory was a 6–0 win over Georgia on October 2, the third game of the season.

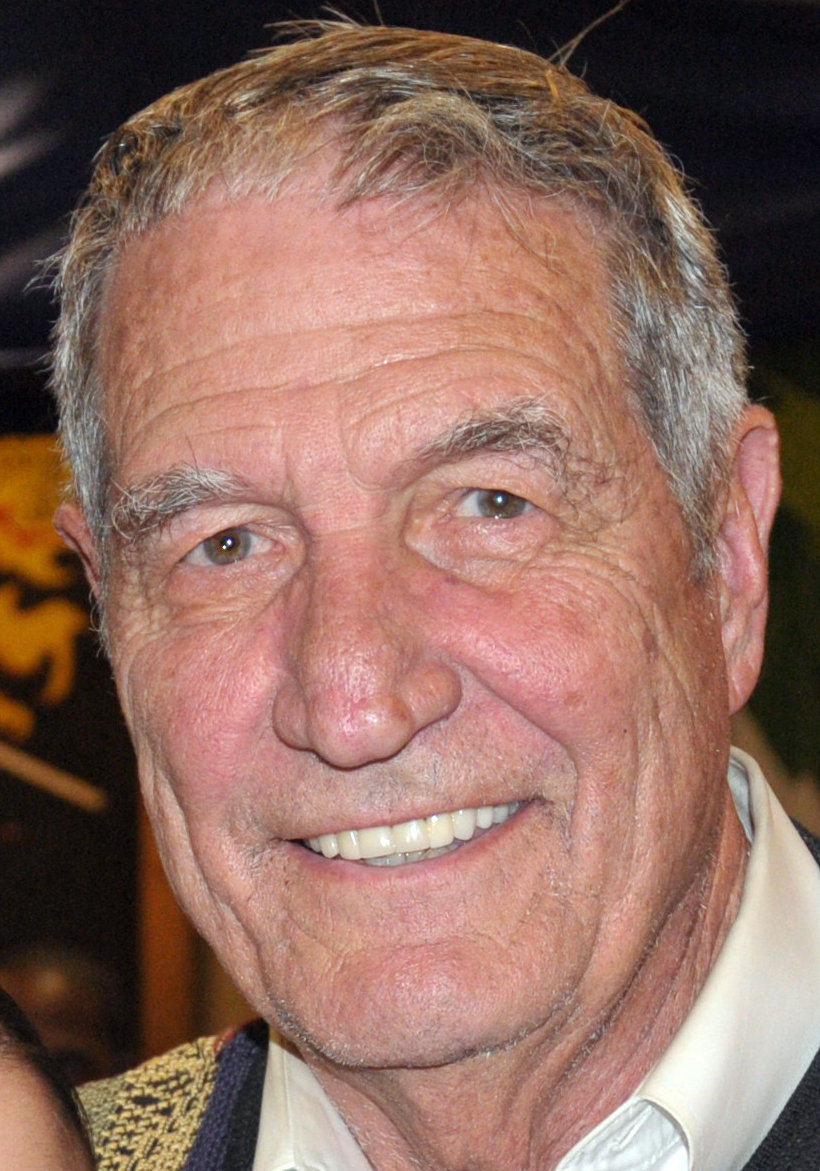
Gene Stallings in 2009

Texas A&M did significantly better the next two seasons, going 7–2–1 in 1955, and 9–0–1 in 1956, winning the Southwest Conference championship despite being on probation.

In 1980, Bryant admitted he was unsure if the Junction Boys was "good or bad" because they "had to put up with my stupidity". He also felt that "if I'd have been one of those players, I'd have quit too."

Two of the Junction Boys, Jack Pardee and Gene Stallings, went on to become head coaches in the National Football League (NFL). Pardee was a two-time All-Pro with the 1963 Los Angeles Rams and the 1971 Washington Redskins. Stallings also became Texas A&M head coach, and his Aggie team beat Bryant's Alabama team in the 1968 Cotton Bowl Classic. Stallings later became head coach at Alabama and won a national championship in his third season in with the 1992 Crimson Tide, which was Alabama's first national championship following Bryant's death.

In 2008, 19 of the Junction Boys had a 54th anniversary reunion at a ranch in Brenham, Texas. The remaining members agreed to have a reunion every five years. In April 2010, the surviving Junction Boys were honored by the Texas Children's Cancer Center at "An Evening with Texas Legends" in Houston, Texas, at the Hilton Americas Hotel. They were interviewed by sportswriter Mickey Herskowitz at the event.

When Coach Bryant died on January 26, 1983, the only piece of jewelry he was wearing was a gold ring inscribed "Junction Boys", given to him in 1979 by the survivors from the Junction practices. Bryant was buried at Elmwood Cemetery in Birmingham, Alabama, with that ring on his finger.

== See also ==
- List of American football films
