= Don Watson (American football) =

American football player and coach (1934–2020)

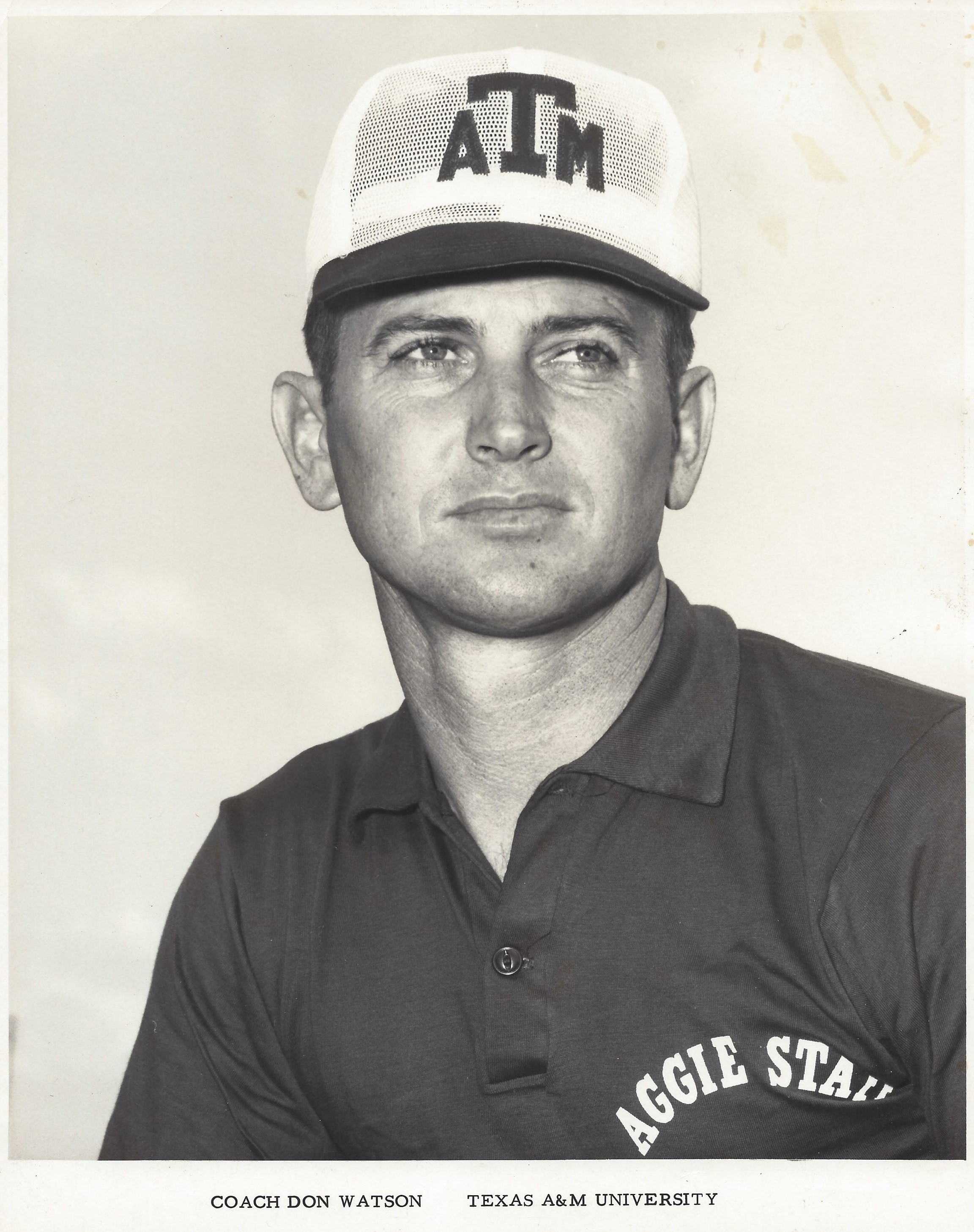

Biographical details
- Born: January 6, 1934; McAllen, Texas, U.S.
- Died: January 7, 2020 (aged 86); Houston, Texas, U.S.
- Education: Texas A&M University

Playing career
- 1952–1956: Texas A&M
- Position: Halfback

Coaching career (HC unless noted)
- 1957–1958: Virginia Tech (assistant)
- 1960–1961: Houston (assistant)
- 1962–1963: Tulane (assistant)
- 1963–1964: South Carolina (assistant)
- 1965–1970: Texas A&M (assistant)

Donald Albert Watson (January 6, 1934 – January 7, 2020) was an American college football player and coach. He played college football at Texas A&M University (1954–1957), where he was one of the "Junction Boys", and later served as the assistant coach at his alma mater from 1965 to 1970. Watson was also the assistant coach at Virginia Tech (1957–1958), University of Houston (1960–1961), Tulane University (1962–1963), and the University South Carolina (1963–1964).

== Early years and playing career ==
Watson played his high school sports in Franklin, Texas, where he won all-state honors. Don was a 1952 graduate of Franklin High School, graduating salutatorian of his class. During his high school athletic career, he earned 18 letters in sports. Because of Watson's memorable performance, Franklin's Head Coach, Joe Hedrick retired Don Watson’s jersey #17 in 1960. He was recruited to Texas A&M University to play college football by then-head coach Raymond George. At Texas A&M, Watson was a member of the famed Junction Boys under head coach Bear Bryant. In 1956, he helped the team finish 9–0–1 and capture its first Southwest Conference championship since 1939. Watson received his Bachelor of Physical Education degree from Texas A&M in 1957.

== Coaching career ==
Virginia Tech (1957–1958), University of Houston (1960–1961) Tulane University (1962–1963) University South Carolina (1963–1964) Texas A&M (1965 to 1970) In 1965 Watson was named assistant coach with his alma mater, Texas A&M. During his tenure, the Aggies won the Southwest Conference in 1967. At the end of that season Texas A&M went on to a victory over Alabama and mentor Bear Bryant in the Cotton Bowl. Watson retired from coaching at the end of the 1970 season.
