= Dead Last =

American television series

- Promotional poster
- Genre: Fantasy; comedy-drama
- Starring: Sara Downing; Tyler Labine; Kett Turton
- Theme music composer: Michael Andrews; Nathan Larson
- Country of origin: United States
- Original language: English
- No. of seasons: 1
- No. of episodes: 13 (6 aired)

Production
- Executive producers: D.V. DeVincentis; Patrick O'Neill; Steve Pink
- Producer: Mary Hanes
- Running time: approx. 50 minutes
- Production companies: Evanston Motor & Pump; Warner Bros. Television

Original release
- Network: The WB
- Release: August 14 – September 25, 2001

Dead Last is an American fantasy comedy-drama television series, produced by Warner Bros. Television, and aired on The WB from August 14 to September 25, 2001. It starred Sara Downing as Jane Cahill, Tyler Labine as Scotty Sallback, and Kett Turton as Vaughn Parrish. The series ran for one season with 13 episodes produced, but only 6 episodes were aired by The WB before the series was cancelled.

== Plot ==
The three members of the fictional touring rock band called The Problem find, and are unable to rid themselves of, a magical amulet that allows them to see and communicate with ghosts. Each episode featured the trio reluctantly completing the unfinished business of the ghosts they encounter in order to allow the ghosts to move on to the next world. Much of the humor of the series came from The Problem wanting to develop their career instead of helping ghosts, and that the trio almost invariably are viewed as, at best, mentally unbalanced by those who cannot see or hear ghosts.

== Episodes ==
No.	Title	Directed by	Written by	Original release date	Prod. code
1	"Pilot"	Randall Miller	Unknown	August 14, 2001	226988
2	"Heebee Geebee's"	Kevin Dowling	J. Elvis Weinstein	August 21, 2001	226957
3	"Death Is in the Air"	James Cox	Patrick O'Neill	August 28, 2001	226962
4	"The Mulravian Candidate"	D.V. DeVincentis	Steve Pink	September 4, 2001	226961
5	"The Problem with Corruption"	Bob Balaban	Dan Mitchell	September 18, 2001	226960
6	"To Serve, with Love"	Tim Hunter	Unknown	September 25, 2001	226998
7	"Gastric Distress"	Bryan Gordon	N/A	Unaired	226955
Note: This was the next episode scheduled to air before the series was canceled.
8	"Teen Spirit"	James Cox	N/A	Unaired	226954
Note: Originally scheduled to air on September 11, 2001, but was preempted by coverage of the September 11 attacks.
9	"He Who Smelt It"	Kevin Dowling	N/A	Unaired	226951
10	"Laughlin It Up"	Bob Balaban	N/A	Unaired	226952
11	"Jane's Exit"	Matthew Harrison	N/A	Unaired	226953
12	"The Crawford Touch"	James Cox	N/A	Unaired	226956
13	"To Live and Amulet Die"	Kevin Dowling	Alex Taub & J. Elvis Weinstein	Unaired	226959

== Broadcast ==
All 13 episodes were aired in Canada on the YTV channel with its first run between September 15 and December 8, 2001. The entire series was frequently broadcast on the Trouble channel in the United Kingdom.
