= Across Five Aprils =

Book by Irene Hunt

- First edition
- Author: Irene Hunt
- Illustrator: Albert John Pucci
- Language: English
- Genre: Historical novel
- Publisher: Follett
- Publication date: 1964
- Publication place: United States
- Media type: Print (Hardback & Paperback)
- Pages: 188
- ISBN: 978-0-425-10241-1

Across Five Aprils is a novel by Irene Hunt, published in 1964 and winner of a 1965 Newbery Honor, set in the Civil War era. Hunt was close to her grandfather who told her stories from his youth, which she incorporated into Across Five Aprils.

== Background ==
Hunt published her first book, Across Five Aprils, at age 57. She researched the historical facts and integrated stories that were told to her by her grandfather. The Creighton family was documented in those stories and in letters and records. Like Jethro, the book's protagonist, her grandfather was only nine when the Civil War erupted, so Hunt used him as a vehicle through which to imagine what a family must have gone through at that time.

== Plot summary ==
Across Five Aprils tells the tale of the Creighton family, inspired by the author's own family. Centered on the Creighton farm in Jasper County, Illinois, the tale describes the experiences of youngest son Jethro and his family during the years of the Civil War.

== Awards and nominations ==
- 1964 – the Charles W. Follett Award
- 1965 – Dorothy Canfield Fisher Award (nominated), the Clara Ingram Judson Memorial Award, Newbery Honor Book
- 1966 – Lewis Carroll Shelf Award
- 1997 – Charles W. D. W. Award

== Screen adaptation ==
The novel was adapted to screen in 1990 by Kevin Meyer and starred Todd Duffey and Miriam Byrd-Nethery.
