= Speedbumps: Flooring It Through Hollywood =

2006 autobiography by Teri Garr

- Author: Teri Garr; Henriette Mantel
- Language: English
- Published: 2006
- Publisher: Plume
- Publication place: United States
- Pages: 256
- ISBN: 9780452285712

Speedbumps: Flooring It Through Hollywood is a 2006 autobiography written by actress Teri Garr with Henriette Mantel. It is also available as an audiobook read by Teri Garr.

This work details her career, which spans over four decades, and her health struggles following her diagnosis with multiple sclerosis.
