= Where's Mommy Now? =

1990 a book by Rochelle Majer Krich

- Author: Rochelle Majer Krich
- Genre: Mystery fiction
- Published: 1990
- Publisher: Pinnacle Books
- Pages: 352
- Awards: Anthony Award for Best Paperback Original (1991)
- ISBN: 978-1-558-17366-8
- Website: Where's Mommy Now?

Where's Mommy Now? (ISBN 978-1-558-17366-8) is a book written by Rochelle Majer Krich and published by Pinnacle Books (now owned by Kensington Books) on 1 June 1990. It won the Anthony Award for Best Paperback Original in 1991.
