= Teri Garr =

American actress (1944–2024)

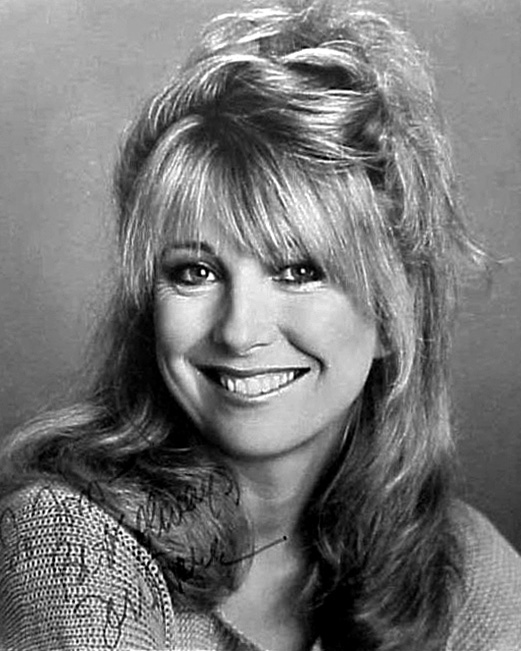
- Garr c. 1981
- Born: Terry Ann Garr; December 11, 1944; Los Angeles, California, U.S. (Note: Many sources place Garr's birth in the Cleveland suburb of Lakewood, Ohio, but others say she was born in Los Angeles, matching the 1950 US Census, which lists her as born in California. Garr said she was born in Los Angeles.)
- Died: October 29, 2024 (aged 79); Los Angeles, California, U.S.
- Burial place: San Fernando Mission Cemetery
- Education: Actors Studio; Lee Strasberg Theatre and Film Institute
- Occupations: Actress, comedienne, dancer
- Years active: 1963–2011
- Spouse: John O'Neil (m. 1993; div. 1996)
- Partners: Roger Birnbaum (1979–1983); David Kipper (1983–1990)
- Children: 1

Terry Ann "Teri" Garr (December 11, 1944 – October 29, 2024) was an American actress, comedienne and dancer. Known for her comedic roles in film and television in the 1970s and 1980s, she often played women struggling to cope with the life-changing experiences of their husbands, children or boyfriends. She received nominations for an Academy Award and a British Academy Film Award for her performance in Tootsie (1982), playing a struggling actress who loses the soap opera role of a female hospital administrator to her male friend and acting coach.

Garr was raised primarily in the neighborhood of North Hollywood in Los Angeles. She was the third child of a comedic-actor father and a studio costumier mother. In her youth, Garr trained in ballet and other forms of dance. She began her career as a teenager with small roles in television and film in the early 1960s, including appearances as a dancer in nine Elvis Presley musicals. After spending two years attending college, Garr left Los Angeles and studied acting at the Lee Strasberg Institute in New York City. She had her breakthrough appearing in the episode "Assignment: Earth" of Star Trek in 1968.

After gaining attention for her 1974 roles in Francis Ford Coppola's thriller The Conversation and Mel Brooks's comedy horror Young Frankenstein, Garr became increasingly successful with major roles in Carl Reiner's comedy Oh, God! and Steven Spielberg's science fiction film Close Encounters of the Third Kind (both 1977) and The Black Stallion (1979). In the 1980s, she was nominated for the Academy Award for Best Supporting Actress for her comedic role as an acting student in Sydney Pollack's romantic comedy Tootsie, and enjoyed leading roles in Coppola's musical drama One from the Heart (1982), Mr. Mom (1983), and Firstborn (1984). She later acted in films such as Martin Scorsese's black comedy After Hours (1985), Let It Ride (1989), Dumb and Dumber (1994), Prêt-à-Porter (1994), Michael (1996), and Ghost World (2001).

Garr's quick wit and charming banter made her a sought-after guest on late-night shows such as The Tonight Show Starring Johnny Carson and Late Night with David Letterman. In 2002, Garr announced that she had been diagnosed with multiple sclerosis, the symptoms of which had affected her ability to perform. She retired from acting in 2011 and died in 2024.

== Early life and education ==
Terry Ann Garr was born in Los Angeles, California, on December 11, 1944. (Note: Various sources have cited numerous years for Garr's date of birth, though the date is always given as December 11. At the start of chapter 2 of her memoir Speedbumps, Garr declines to give her age. A few pages later, she indicates that she was 11 when her father died in September 1956. This fact places her birth year as 1944. In addition, the April 1950 U.S. Census entry for the Eddie Garr family indicates that Teri was five years old, which also places her year of birth as 1944. The same census gives her birthplace as California.) She spent her early years in Franklin Lakes, New Jersey, and Lakewood, Ohio, before her family settled in Los Angeles. Her father, Eddie Garr (born Edward Leo Gonnoud), was a vaudeville performer, comedian, and actor, whose career peaked when he briefly took over the lead role in the Broadway drama Tobacco Road. Her mother, Phyllis Lind Garr (born Emma Schmotzer), was a dancer, a Rockette, wardrobe mistress, and model. Her father was of Irish descent and her maternal grandparents were Austrian immigrants. Garr had two older brothers, Ed and Phil.

When Garr was 11, her father died in Los Angeles of a heart attack. She recalled that his death "left us bereft, without any kind of income. And I saw my mother be this incredibly strong, creative woman who put three kids through college—one of my brothers is a surgeon. Any kind of lessons we wanted, we had to have scholarships or sweep the floors. It had to be free. And so we always had to try harder. That was instilled in me very early." During her youth, Garr expressed interest in dancing and trained extensively in ballet. "I'd go for three, four hours a day; my feet would be bleeding", she recalled. "I'd take buses all over the city just to go to the best dancing schools. You could just stand there and be quiet and beat yourself up, push the body." Garr graduated from North Hollywood High School, and attended San Fernando Valley State College for two years before dropping out and relocating to New York City to further pursue acting. In New York City, she studied at the Actors Studio and the Lee Strasberg Theatre and Film Institute.

== Career ==
=== Early films and stage ===
Early in her career, she was credited as Terry Garr. She later recalled changing her first name to "Teri" on the advice of a numerologist, who said she would be unsuccessful if she had repeating letters in her first and last names. Her movie debut was as an extra in A Swingin' Affair (1963). During her senior year, she auditioned for the cast of the Los Angeles road company production of West Side Story, where she met one of the most important people in her early career, David Winters, who became her friend, dance teacher, and mentor. Winters cast her in many of his early movies and projects.

Garr began as a background go-go dancer in uncredited roles in youth-oriented films and TV shows choreographed by Winters, including Pajama Party (a beach party film), the T.A.M.I. Show, Shivaree, Hullabaloo, Movin' with Nancy, Shindig! and nine Elvis Presley features (many of which were also choreographed by Winters, including Presley's most profitable film, Viva Las Vegas). When asked in a magazine interview about how she landed jobs in so many Presley films, Garr answered, "One of the dancers in the road show of West Side Story (David Winters) started to choreograph movies, and whatever job he got, I was one of the girls he'd hire. So he was chosen to do Viva Las Vegas. That was my first movie."

She often appeared on television during this time, performing as a go-go dancer on several musical variety shows, along with friend Toni Basil, such as Shindig! and Hullabaloo. In 1966, Garr made one appearance on Batman (episode seven, uncredited). In 1968, she appeared in both The Andy Griffith Show and Mayberry R.F.D. and was in two episodes of It Takes a Thief.

=== Film and television; critical acclaim ===
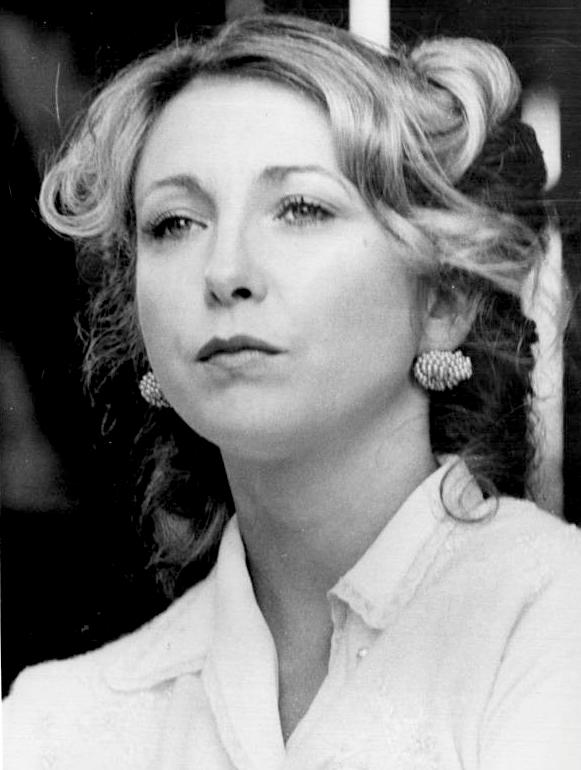
Garr in The Black Stallion, 1978

Her first speaking role in a motion picture was a brief appearance as a damsel in distress in The Monkees' film Head (1968), written by Jack Nicholson; Garr got the role after meeting Nicholson in an acting class. "He wrote the script for Head, so all of us in the class got little tiny parts in the movie," she recalled. "I was ... Who was I? Oh yes, I was the girl dying of a snakebite, who falls off the Conestoga wagon and says, 'Quick, suck it before the venom reaches my heart!' " Earlier in that year, she landed her first significant TV role, featured as secretary Roberta Lincoln in the Star Trek episode "Assignment: Earth", designed as a backdoor pilot episode for a new series that was not commissioned. "Star Trek was the first job where I had a fairly big (for me) speaking part," Garr related in her memoir, "I played Roberta Lincoln, a dippy secretary in a pink and orange costume with a very short skirt. Had the spin-off succeeded, I would have continued on as an earthling agent, working to preserve humanity. In a very short skirt." This led to her being, in her words, "cast as birdbrained lasses," in episodes of other TV shows.

In 1972, she landed a regular role in The Ken Berry "WOW" Show, a summer replacement series. Afterward, she was a regular cast member on The Sonny & Cher Comedy Hour, dancing and acting in comedy sketches.

Garr appeared in a string of highly successful films in the mid-to-late 1970s, including a supporting role in Francis Ford Coppola's thriller The Conversation (1974). This was followed with her role as Inga, an assistant to Dr. Frederick Frankenstein, in the Mel Brooks horror comedy Young Frankenstein (1974), which marked a career breakthrough. She then appeared in a dramatic role in Steven Spielberg's science-fiction film Close Encounters of the Third Kind (1977) as the wife of Richard Dreyfuss's character; in Oh, God! (1977) as the wife of John Denver's character; and the drama The Black Stallion (1979) as the mother of the boy protagonist.

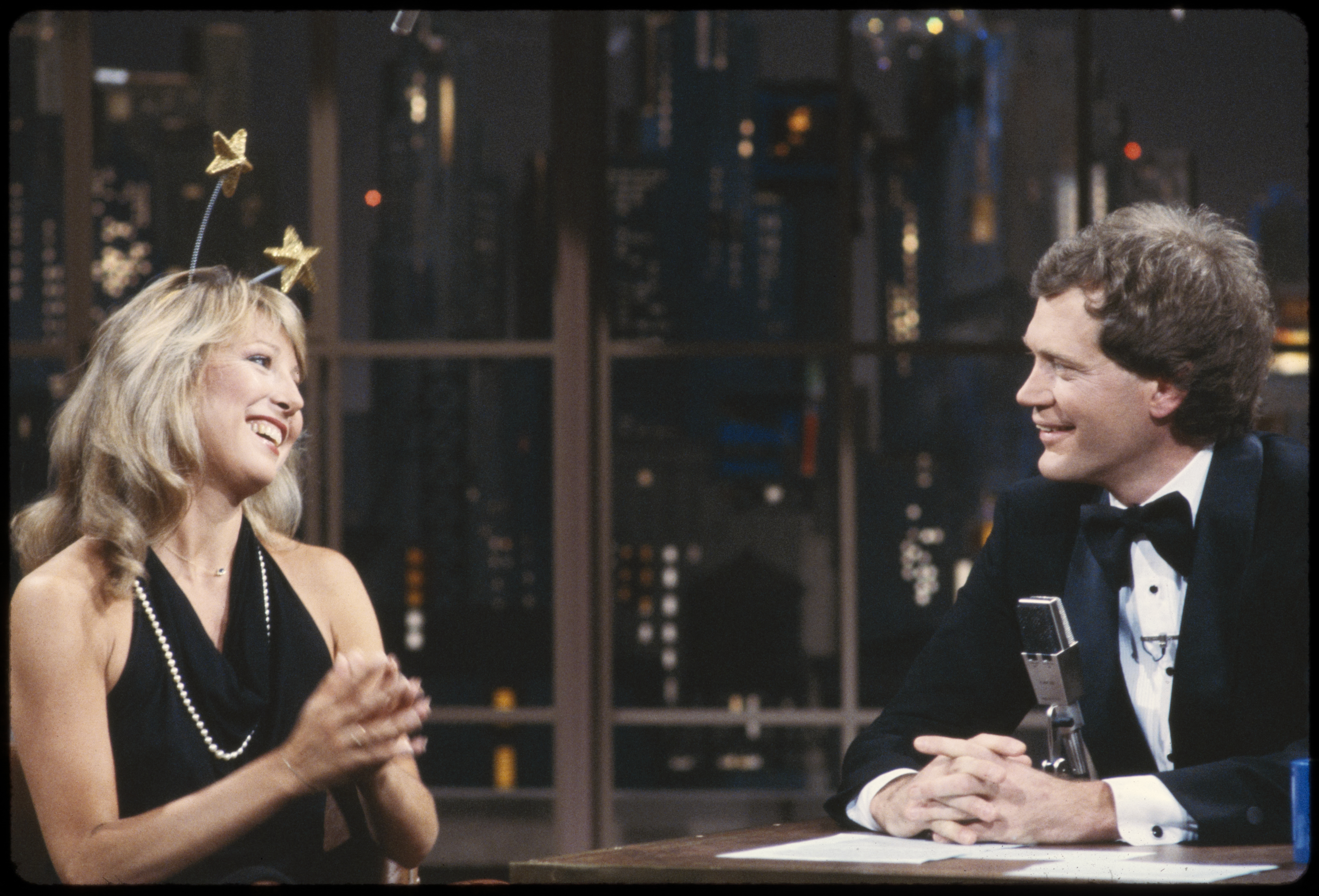
Garr on Late Night with David Letterman in 1982

In 1978, Garr appeared off-Broadway in a production of One Crack Out by Canadian playwright David French, playing the wife of Charlie, a pool hustler in Toronto. Richard Eder of The New York Times noted that Garr "manages an attractive uncertainty and devotion as Charlie's wife."

In 1982, she starred opposite Dustin Hoffman in the comedy Tootsie (1982), playing an actress whose actor friend (Hoffman) disguises himself as a woman to further his career. For her role, she was nominated for an Academy Award for Best Supporting Actress. She then appeared in the comedy Mr. Mom (1983) as the wife of Michael Keaton's character, followed by a supporting role in Martin Scorsese's After Hours (1985).

=== Later work and television ===
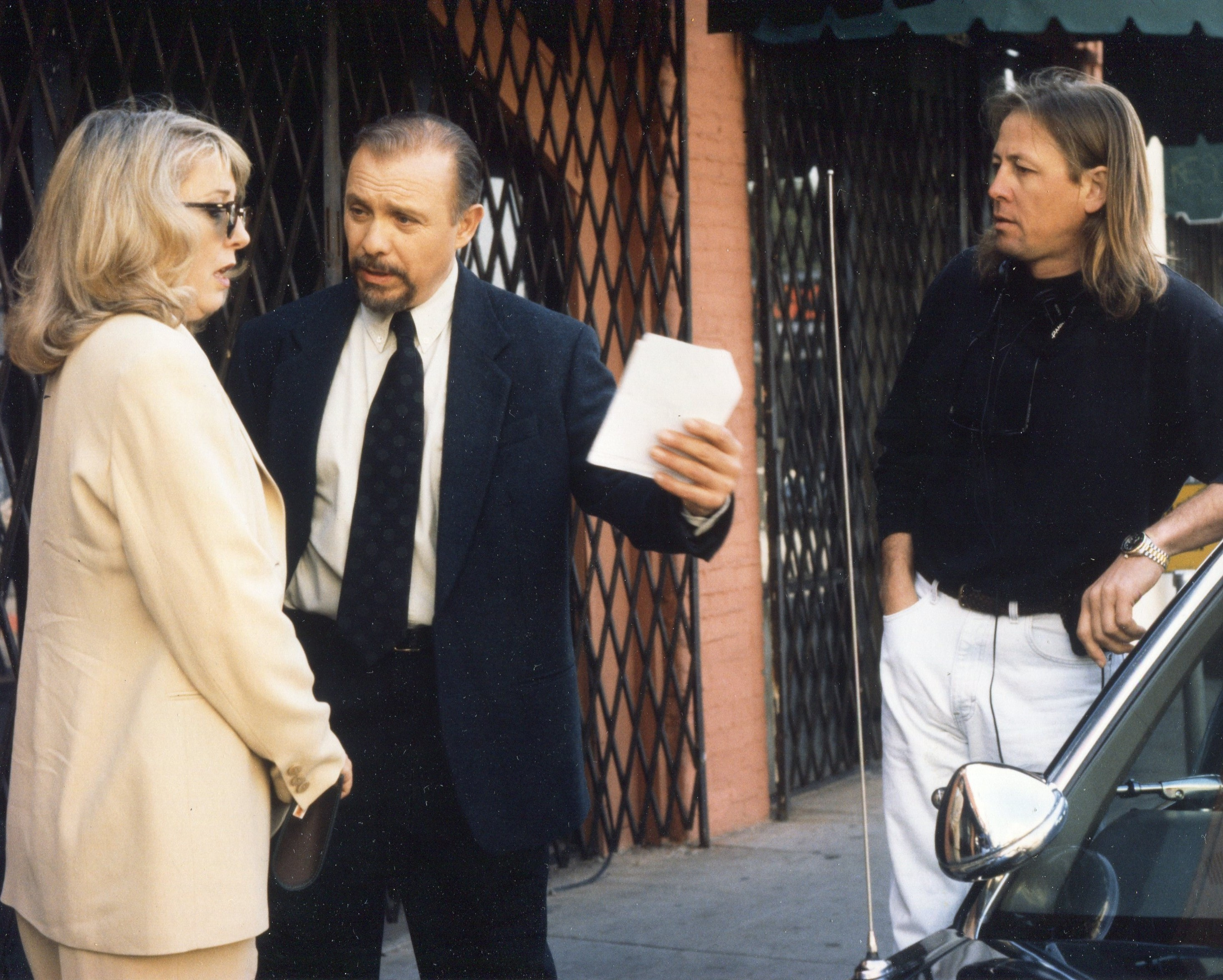
Garr and Hector Elizondo on the set of Perfect Alibi (1995) with director Kevin Meyer

In the 1970s, Garr had a recurring role on McCloud, and appeared on M*A*S*H, The Bob Newhart Show, The Odd Couple, Maude, Barnaby Jones, and Paul Sand in Friends and Lovers. She hosted Saturday Night Live three times (in 1980, 1983, and 1985), and was a frequent visitor on The Tonight Show Starring Johnny Carson, appearing over 40 times.

As a recurring guest on Late Night with David Letterman, Garr was renowned for her unscripted banter with David Letterman, who once goaded her into showering in his office while the camera rolled. Letterman later apologized to Garr, stating that he came to realize the constant requests for her to shower were "maybe kind of a sexist thing to do." In 1986, Garr appeared in episode 2223 of Sesame Street as Amelia Adams, a student of Oscar the Grouch's school, Oscar's New School For Grouch Research.

Garr had several prominent dramatic roles on television in the 1980s, starring opposite Donald Sutherland in an adaptation of John Steinbeck's The Winter of Our Discontent (1983), in the parody miniseries Fresno (1986), and opposite Ellen Burstyn in an adaptation of the play Pack of Lies (1987), which earned an Emmy nomination for Outstanding Drama or Comedy Special.

In 1989, Garr appeared in Let It Ride, also opposite Dreyfuss. Her film roles during the 1990s included the role of Marge Nelson in the comedy Mom and Dad Save the World (1992), a parody of science fiction films, the stepmother of Lauren Holly's character in the comedy Dumb and Dumber (1994), the wife of Danny Aiello's character in Robert Altman's ensemble film Prêt-à-Porter (1994), and a judge in the fantasy comedy Michael (1996). In the late 1990s, Garr landed a role as recurring character Phoebe Abbott in Friends, the estranged birth mother of Phoebe Buffay.

Garr's career began to slow in the late 1990s after a neurologist informed her that symptoms she had been experiencing for many years were those of multiple sclerosis. In film, she appeared in minor supporting roles, including a witch in the children's film Casper Meets Wendy (1998) and the mother of Michelle Williams in the political comedy Dick (1999). This was followed by an uncredited role in Terry Zwigoff's Ghost World (2001). She also provided the voice of Mary McGinnis, Terry McGinnis's mother, in Batman Beyond (1999–2001).

Garr returned to the stage in the fall of 2000, appearing in numerous off-Broadway performances of The Vagina Monologues opposite Sanaa Lathan and Julianna Margulies. She subsequently had minor supporting roles in the Christmas comedy film Unaccompanied Minors (2006), and the independent comedies Expired and Kabluey (both 2007).

=== Retirement ===
In 2006, Garr published an autobiography, Speedbumps: Flooring It Through Hollywood, which details her career and health struggles after her diagnosis of multiple sclerosis in 2002. Garr appeared on The Moth Radio Hour broadcast of December 9, 2009, to tell a humorous reminiscence, "Wake Up Call".

Garr last acted on television in 2011. She appeared at the 19th Annual Race to Erase MS event in 2012. In 2019, it was revealed Garr had retired from acting in 2011.

== Personal life ==
=== Marriage and relationships ===
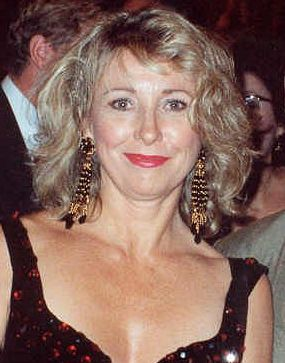
Garr at the AIDS Project Los Angeles (APLA) benefit, September 1990

In the early 1980s, Garr was in a seven-year relationship with film executive Roger Birnbaum. After separating from Birnbaum, Garr was in a seven-year relationship with David Kipper, a physician, to whom she was introduced by Carrie Fisher. In 1993, Garr married building contractor John O'Neil, and that same year, in November, they adopted daughter Molly O'Neil. The couple divorced in 1996.

=== Stalking incident ===
In July 1990, a Los Angeles County judge ordered a woman charged with stalking Garr to cease contacting her and to remain 100 yards (91 m) away from Garr, her home, and her work locations for three years.

=== Political activism ===
In March 1988, Garr was arrested for trespassing in Mercury, Nevada, during a protest against nuclear weapons testing in the area.

She participated in events for The Trevor Project, a nonprofit LGBTQ youth suicide prevention organization.

=== Illness and death ===
In October 2002, Garr confirmed that she had been diagnosed with multiple sclerosis. After years of uncertainty and secrecy about her diagnosis, Garr explained her reasons for deciding to go public:

I'm telling my story for the first time so I can help people. I can help people know they aren't alone and tell them there are reasons to be optimistic because, today, treatment options are available.

In interviews, Garr said that she first started noticing symptoms while she was in New York filming Tootsie around 1982. After disclosing her condition, she became a National Ambassador for the National Multiple Sclerosis Society and National Chair for the Society's Women Against MS program (WAMS). In November 2005, Garr was honored as the society's Ambassador of the Year. The same year, she revealed her treatment regimen for the disease, which included regular steroid injections to help manage symptoms. Closer reported in August 2015 that she credited her positive attitude and her family's support with helping her fight the disease.

In December 2006, Garr had a ruptured brain aneurysm. The aneurysm left her in a coma for a week, but after therapy, she regained speech and motor skills, and in June 2008 she appeared on Late Show with David Letterman to promote Expired, a 2007 film in which she played one of a set of twins.

Garr died from complications of her multiple sclerosis at her home in Los Angeles surrounded by family and friends, on October 29, 2024, at the age of 79. She is interred at San Fernando Mission Cemetery in Mission Hills, California.

== Legacy and reception ==
Garr has been called a "comedic legend." In 1982, film critic Pauline Kael called her "the funniest neurotic dizzy dame on the screen." Numerous performers have cited her as an influence, including Jenna Fischer and Tina Fey.

Upon her death, talk show host David Letterman called her "one of The Late Show's all-time favorite guests" adding, "Teri Garr's many appearances on Late Night gave it a cachet and importance not possible without her. She was a first class actor and comedian and a lovely human being. She elevated all, and I'm sad she is gone." Director Mel Brooks wrote, "She was so talented and so funny. Her humor and lively spirit made the Young Frankenstein set a pleasure to work on". Her Tootsie co-star Dustin Hoffman released a statement reading, in part, "Teri was brilliant and singular in all she did, and had a heart of gold. Working with her was one of the great highs. There was no one like her". Numerous figures in the entertainment industry also paid tribute including Steve Martin, Michael Keaton, Richard Dreyfuss, Lisa Kudrow, Jamie Lee Curtis, Michael McKean, Paul Feig and Francis Ford Coppola.

== Acting credits and accolades ==
Year	Institution	Category	Nominated work	Result	Ref.
1978	Saturn Awards	Best Supporting Actress	Close Encounters of the Third Kind	Nominated	
1983	Academy Awards	Best Supporting Actress	Tootsie	Nominated	
1983	National Society of Film Critics	Best Supporting Actress	Tootsie	3rd Place	
1983	CableACE Awards	Best Dramatic Actress	Faerie Tale Theatre (Episode: "The Tale of the Frog Prince")	Nominated	
1984	BAFTA Awards	Best Supporting Actress	Tootsie	Nominated	
1994	National Board of Review	Best Acting Ensemble	Prêt-à-Porter	Won	

== Bibliography ==
- Speedbumps: Flooring It Through Hollywood, 2006

== Works cited ==
- Eichenbaum, Rose (2011). The Actor Within: Intimate Conversations with Great Actors. Middletown, Connecticut: Wesleyan University Press. ISBN 978-0-819-57165-6.
- Garr, Teri (2006). Speedbumps: Flooring It Through Hollywood. New York: Penguin. ISBN 978-0-452-28571-2.
- Hellmann, Paul T. (2006). Historical Gazetteer of the United States. New York: Routledge. ISBN 978-1-135-94858-0.
- Leszcak, Bob (August 23, 2014). The Odd Couple on Stage and Screen: A History with Cast and Crew Profiles and an Episode Guide. Jefferson, North Carolina: McFarland. ISBN 978-1-476-61539-4.
- Lisanti, Thomas (2015). Hollywood Surf and Beach Movies: The First Wave, 1959–1969. Jefferson, North Carolina: McFarland. ISBN 978-1-476-60142-7.
- Willis, John (2005). Screen World. Vol. 55. Milwaukee, Wisconsin: Hal Leonard Corporation. ISBN 978-1-557-83638-0.
