= Kevin Meyer (director) =

American Filmmaker, Director and Writer

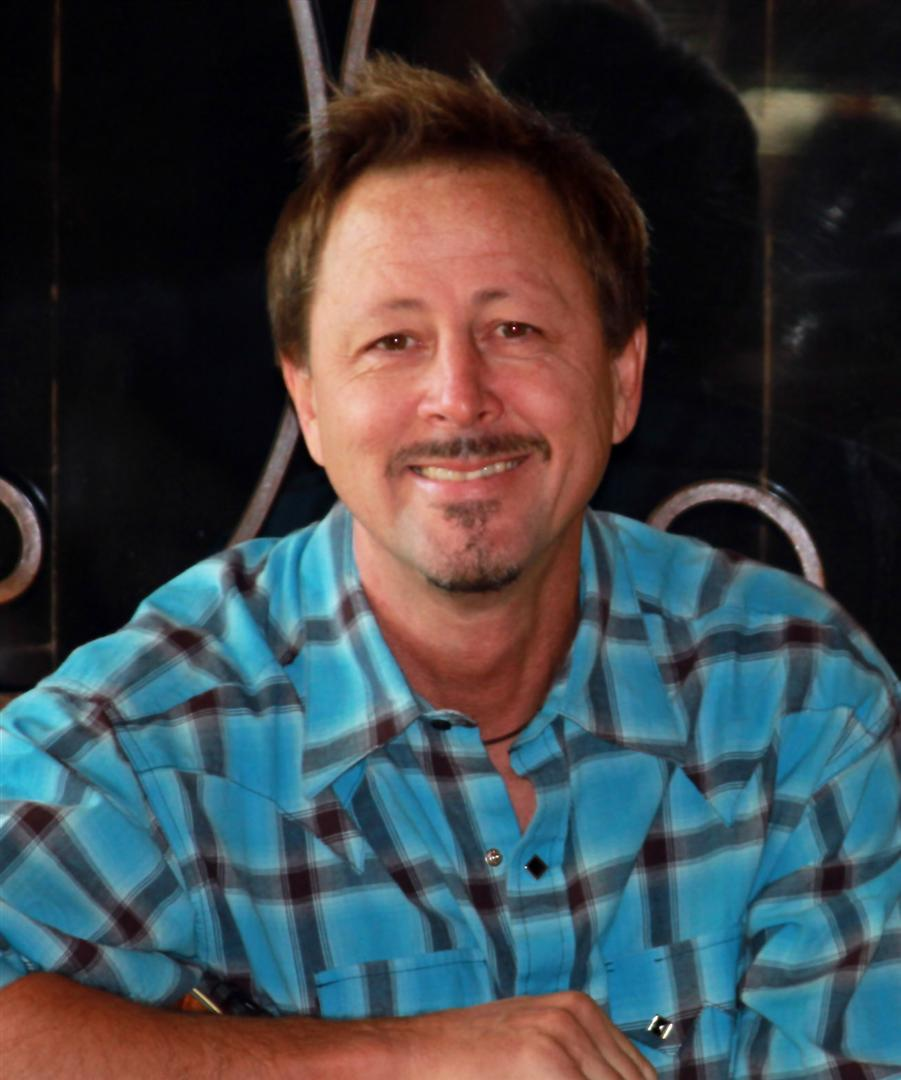
- Education: USC School of Cinematic Arts
- Occupations: Filmmaker director Writer
- Years active: 1982–present
- Notable work: 12 Mighty Orphans, Screenwriter; Perfect Alibi, Director; A Smile Like Yours, Writer

Kevin Meyer is an American filmmaker, director, and writer. He is known for movies such as 12 Mighty Orphans, A Smile Like Yours and Perfect Alibi. Meyer attended the USC School of Cinematic Arts and co-directed a 30-minute film called Divided We Fall with Jeff Burr. The film went on to win fourteen film festival awards and is considered one of the most decorated films in the history of USC Cinema. Meyer also wrote, produced, and directed a series of short documentaries for the National Museum of the United States Army.

== Filmography ==
- 2021, 12 Mighty Orphans, Screenplay
- 2020, The Army Behind the Army, National Museum of the United States Army Documentary Series Producer & Director
- 2016, American Con, (Pilot) Producer & Writer
- 2013, Game Day with Rex & Kevo, (Pilot) Director & Producer
- 2013, Army Mail National Museum of the United States Army Documentary Short
- 1997, A Smile Like Yours, Writer
- 1995, Perfect Alibi, Writer & Director
- 1993, Under Investigation, Writer & Director
- 1992, Invasion of Privacy, Writer & Director
- 1990, Across Five Aprils, Writer & Director
- 1989, Stepfather II, Second Unit Director
- 1989, Oklahoma Passage, Screenplay
- 1986, Wanted Dead or Alive, Assistant Director
- 1986, Terror at Tenkiller, Actor
- 1982, Divided We Fall, Co-director
