= American football rules =

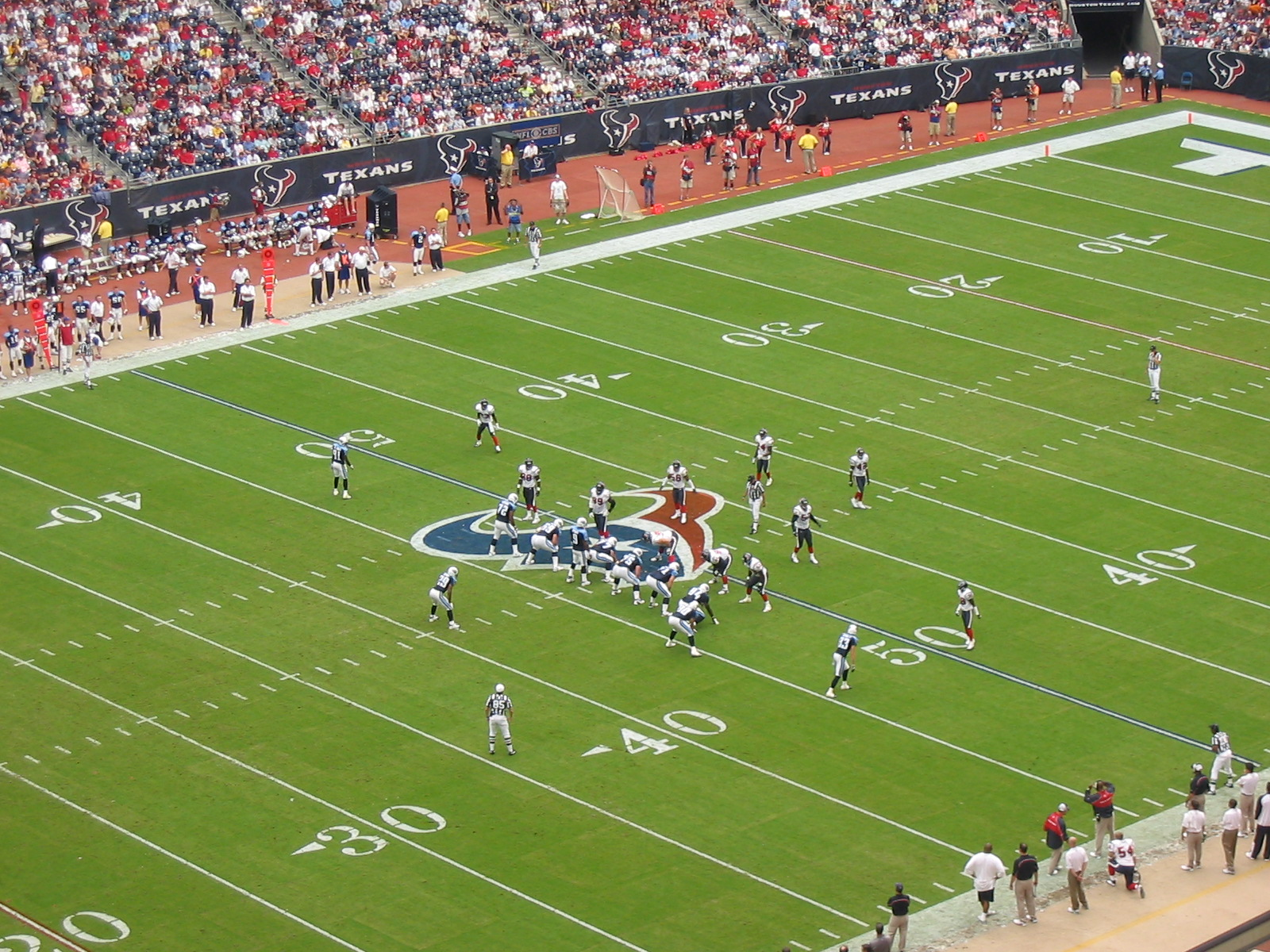
The Tennessee Titans and the Houston Texans in formation before a play in October 2005

Gameplay in American football consists of a series of downs, individual plays of short duration, outside of which the ball is or is not in play. These can be plays from the line of scrimmage – passes, runs, punts or field goal attempts (from either a place kick or a drop kick) – or free kicks such as kickoffs and fair catch kicks. Substitutions can be made between downs, which allows for a great deal of specialization as coaches choose the players best suited for each particular situation for offense, defense, and also special teams. During a play, each team should have a maximum of 11 players on the field, and each of them has specific tasks assigned for that specific play.

== Objective of the game ==
The objective of the game is to reach the other side of the field in order to score. In order for a team to score they must run the ball to the end zone to score a touchdown. To move the ball and score, the team on the offense has to either run a running play or a passing play. The team with the ball (the offense) has four plays (downs) to advance at least 10 yards. If the offense succeeds in advancing at least 10 yards, they earn a first down and the number of downs a team has left is reset to 4. The team playing the offensive must now run an additional 10 yards to earn another first down from where they ended the last play (line of scrimmage). If the offense does not advance at least 10 yards during their four downs, the team without the ball (the defense) regains control of the ball (a turnover on downs).

On offense, points are scored by advancing the ball into the opponent's end zone for a touchdown worth six points or by kicking the ball from the playing field through the raised vertical posts (the goalposts) situated on the end line of the end zone for a field goal worth three points. After scoring a touchdown, the offense is given an additional opportunity to attempt to score during an un-timed play. Conversion attempts are used to score 1 or 2 points as follows:

- The offense may attempt a kick (from the 3-yard line for high school, 2-yard line in college, and the 15-yard line in the NFL) worth 1 point (a one-point conversion).
- The offense may attempt to advance the ball (from the 2-yard line for high school and the NFL or the 3-yard line in college) into the opponent's end zone for 2 points (a two-point conversion).

While the opposing team has possession, the defense attempts to prevent the offense from advancing the ball and scoring. If an offensive player drops the ball during play (a fumble) or the ball is caught by a defensive player while still in the air (an interception), the defense may attempt to run into the opponent's end zone for a touchdown. The defense may also score two points by tackling the ball carrier in the offense's own end zone (a safety). In addition to this, if a team attempting to score or defending an extra point or two-point conversion scores what would normally be a safety, the defensive team is awarded a Conversion safety and is allowed to gain one extra point. In NCAA, NFL, and High School Football in Texas if the defense gains possession of the ball and returns it to the other end zone during an after-touchdown extra point or two point conversion attempt, the defense is awarded a Defensive two-point conversion and scores two points.

== Time of play ==
College and professional NFL games are 1 hour long and are divided into four quarters of 15 minutes each. In high school football, 12-minute quarters are typically played. However, the game clock is stopped frequently, and a typical college or professional game can exceed three total hours. The referee controls the clock and stops it after any incomplete pass or play that ends out of bounds, a change of possession of the ball from one team to the other, field goal tries, and kickoffs. In addition, each team is allowed three timeouts each half that may be used at their discretion. The clock normally runs during the action of plays, with a few exceptions known as un-timed plays. Some high schools employ a mercy rule in which the clock runs continuously after one team's lead over the other achieves a certain number of points. In these instances, the clock only stops for injuries and timeouts called by a team or a referee.

The clock may also be stopped for an officials' timeout, after which, if the clock was running, it is restarted. For example, if there is a question about whether a team has moved the ball far enough for a first down, the officials may use a measuring device (the chains) to determine the distance. While this measurement is taking place, the officials will signal for a stoppage of the clock. Once the measurement is finished and the ball is placed at the proper location (spotted), the referee will then signal for the clock to restart. Additional situations where officials may take a timeout are to administer a penalty or for an injured player to be removed from the field. Officials also call media timeouts, which allow time for television and radio advertising, often after scoring plays, a change of position, or during extended injury timeouts. If an instant replay challenge is called during the game, the referees signal for a media timeout. The referee signals media timeouts by first using the timeout signal and then extending both arms in a horizontal position.

In addition to the game clock, a separate play clock is used. This counts down the time the offense has to start the next play before it is assessed a delay of game penalty. This clock is typically 25 seconds from when the referee marks the ball ready for play. The NFL and NCAA use a 40-second play clock that starts immediately after the previous play ends, though, for certain delays, such as penalty enforcement, the offense has 25 seconds from when the ball is marked ready. The purpose of the play clock is to ensure that the game progresses consistently, preventing unnecessary delays. Overall, clock management is a significant part of the game; teams leading toward the end of the game will often try to run out the clock via kneeldowns.

Teams change ends of the field at the end of the first quarter and the end of the third quarter, though the situation on the field regarding possession, downs remaining, and distance-to-goal does not change (so a team with possession 5 yards from the opponent's end zone at the end of the first quarter would resume playing 5 yards from the end zone at the other end of the field, which they would then be attacking). Separating the first and second halves is halftime. Both halves and any overtime begin with kick-offs, and the kicking team at the beginning of the game and overtime is decided by a coin toss, while the other team kicks off at the beginning of the second half.

In the NFL, college and Texas high school football, an automatic timeout is called by the officials once the ball is dead and there are two minutes or less left on the game clock in the second quarter, fourth quarter, and overtime (a two-minute warning). No such warning is normally given in high school football, though if there is no visible stadium clock, the referee will give a four-minute warning.

== Overtime ==
=== NFL ===
In the preseason (before 1974 and since 2021), games that are tied at the end of four quarters end in a tie.

In the regular season and playoffs, if a game is tied at the end of four quarters, overtime is played. In overtime, a coin toss is used to determine which team will possess the ball first. The winner of the coin toss can choose to give the ball or receive the ball. In the regular season, since 2025, if the first possession results in a touchdown by the defensive team on a turnover or the defensive team scores a safety, that team wins. Both teams get the opportunity to possess the ball, but if the tie persists after both teams have had one possession, the game goes into sudden death and whoever scores first wins. If neither team scores after their first possession, the game ends in a tie. In the unlikely event that time expires during the receiving team's first possession the game ends in a tie; if time expires as the receiving team scores on its first possession then that team wins.

In playoff games, both teams have the opportunity to possess the ball too. If the score is still tied after each team has possessed the ball, whoever scores next wins. However, if the team kicking off to start the overtime scores a safety on the receiving team's initial possession, the scoring team wins it and advances.

During the regular season, one 10-minute overtime period is played, with each team receiving two timeouts. If the game is still tied after 10 minutes, the game officially ends in a tie. In the playoffs, overtime periods are 15 minutes and consecutive periods continue until a winner is determined, plus three timeouts per two overtime periods (including even-numbered OT if needed). Overtime follows a three-minute intermission after the end of the regulation game. Before the start of overtime, a coin flip is performed, and the captain of the visiting team calls the toss. The team that wins the coin flip has the option either to receive the kickoff or choose the side of the field they wish to defend. Ties in the NFL are rare, with the most recent being a game between the New York Giants and the Washington Commanders, on October 11th, 2026, which ended with each team tied at 27 points.

==== Rule changes ====
The overtime rules changed thrice for the 2016–17, 2017–18 & 2025-26 seasons. For the 2017 season, the overtime period was shortened from 15 minutes to 10 minutes for the preseason and regular season. The overtime for the postseason remains 15 minutes.

Before the 2010–11 playoffs, the overtime winner was simply the first team to score any points; however, the rules were changed to reduce the advantage obtained by the team that won the overtime coin toss. Under the prior rules, the team that won the coin toss would usually elect to receive the ball and then gain just enough yardage to win the game by kicking a field goal without the other team ever touching the ball. The coin toss winner won approximately 60% of overtime games under that rule, rather than the 50% expected by random chance.

The 2025 regular season will see a copy of the 2010-11 playoff rules guaranteeing both teams the opportunity to possess the ball to start overtime; however, should the tie persist, sudden death rules apply hereafter until time is up.

==== Notable games ====
The first overtime game played under a trial of the new overtime rules occurred in a 2012 AFC wild card game between the Denver Broncos and Pittsburgh Steelers at Sports Authority Field at Mile High, Denver, Colorado. Denver won the game on the first play in overtime, an 80-yard touchdown pass from Tim Tebow to Demaryius Thomas. The rule was formally adopted for the 2012 season, and the first game in which both teams scored in overtime was a 43–37 victory by the Houston Texans over the Jacksonville Jaguars on November 18, 2012.

Super Bowl LI was the first Super Bowl to go into overtime with a 28-all tie between the Atlanta Falcons and New England Patriots, which the Patriots eventually won with James White scoring a touchdown on the Patriots' first drive.

The 2019 NFC and AFC championship games both went to overtime, the first time for such an occurrence. In the NFC title game, the New Orleans Saints won the coin toss but an interception allowed the Los Angeles Rams to drive into range to kick the game-winning field goal. In the AFC Championship held later that day, the New England Patriots won the coin toss and on their first drive scored the game-winning touchdown over the Kansas City Chiefs.

==== NFL Europa ====
NFL Europa used a 10-minute overtime period where each team had the opportunity of possession before proceeding like the NFL's. Thus, if Team A had the first possession of overtime, scored a touchdown, and converted their kick (thus being seven points ahead of Team B), Team A would then kick off to Team B. Team B would have to then match or exceed the seven-point difference within their ensuing possession; exceeding it would end the game immediately while matching the difference would result in a kickoff to Team A. From this point, the overtime was sudden death. The 2009 to 2012 iteration of the United Football League also utilized this overtime system.

=== World Football League ===
The defunct World Football League, in its first season of 1974, used an overtime system more analogous to the system long used in international soccer. The overtime consisted of one 15-minute period, which was played in its entirety and divided into two halves of 7½ minutes each, with each half starting with a kickoff by one of the teams. The league changed to the NFL's sudden-death format for its final season in 1975.

=== College football ===
In college football, games tied at the end of regulation go into overtime(s) to determine a winner—there are no ties. In addition, the game clock is not used during overtime periods, unlike in the NFL. During the first overtime, both teams are granted one possession of the ball at their opponents' 25-yard line. At the beginning of overtime, a coin flip takes place, with the winning team having the option either to declare that they will take the ball first or to decide on which end of the field the series will occur (both teams' series occur on the same end of the field). The losing team will have the first option in any subsequent even-numbered overtime. In the first overtime, the team with the first series attempts to score either a touchdown or a field goal. Their possession ends when they score either a touchdown or a field goal, turn the ball over via a fumble or an interception, or fail to gain a first down. After a touchdown, a team may attempt either an extra point or a two-point conversion. If the team on defense during the first series recovers a fumble and returns it for a touchdown, or returns an interception for a touchdown, the defensive team wins the game. Otherwise, regardless of the outcome of the first team's series, the other team begins their series. If the score remains tied after both teams have completed a series, the procedure is repeated into double overtime. In that period, if a touchdown is scored, a two-point conversion will be required rather than an extra point. If the game is still tied after double overtime, each team attempts one 2-point conversion per period rather than getting the ball at the 25-yard line, and repeats hereafter if tie still persists.

=== High school football ===
In high school football, individual state associations can choose any overtime format they want, or even elect to not play overtime at all (ties stand in this case). However, most states use the Kansas Plan. In a majority of states, each team is granted possession of the ball at the 10-yard line, meaning that a team cannot make a first down without scoring except via a defensive penalty that carries an automatic first down (such as defensive pass interference or roughing the passer). As is the case with the college overtime rule, the team that wins the coin toss will have the choice as to whether to take the ball first or second or decide at which end of the field the overtime will be played. The other major difference between overtime in college football and high school football is that in some states, if the defense forces a turnover, the ball is dead immediately, thus eliminating the possibility of scoring. However, in Texas, the college overtime rule is used, as both the University Interscholastic League, which governs interscholastic activities for Texas public high schools, and the Texas Association of Private and Parochial Schools, the largest analogous body for Texas private high schools, play by NCAA football rules with a few modifications for the high school level.

=== XFL ===
The original incarnation of the XFL used a modified Kansas Plan which, upon the first team scoring, required the opponent to score the same or greater number of points in the same or fewer downs (i.e., if the first team scored a touchdown, and converted the one-point conversion in three downs, the opponent would have to match that touchdown and conversion in three downs as well). Each team started at the 20-yard line, but like high school, there were no opportunities for first downs. The league also banned field goals except on a fourth down.

The XFL's second incarnation used a five-round shootout of two-point conversions similar to a penalty shootout in soccer or ice hockey. The current UFL also uses the XFL's overtime system, albeit reduced to best-of-three. Such a shootout had never been attempted in organized football at the time the rule was proposed; in April 2019, the NCAA adopted a similar concept for games that reach quintuple overtime, starting with the 2019 FBS season, two seasons later, triple overtime. The defense is not able to score, as should a turnover occur, the play would be dead. Defensive penalties result in the ball moving up to the 1-yard line, while a second defensive penalty on any play, even in future rounds, results in a score awarded to the offensive team. To speed up the overtime process, both teams' offense and defense are on the field at the appropriate end zone. Once one team's offense has completed its round of the shootout, the other team's offense plays its round from the opposite end zone. These overtime rules ensure that both teams have an opportunity to win the game and would limit overtime to 5 or 6 minutes. If both teams remain tied after five rounds, multiple rounds of conversions will be played until one team succeeds, thus ensuring that no game can end in a draw.

=== USFL (2022) ===
In the second incarnation of the United States Football League, teams played three (at least two) rounds of two-point conversions from the three-yard line. The coin toss was called by the visiting team; the winner of the toss could choose to possess the ball first or defend. The team scoring the most points in the three rounds won the game; otherwise, teams played sudden-death rounds until one team scored. One timeout could be called per overtime round. Although no game clock was used, the play clock of 35 seconds was still used.

== Playing the game ==
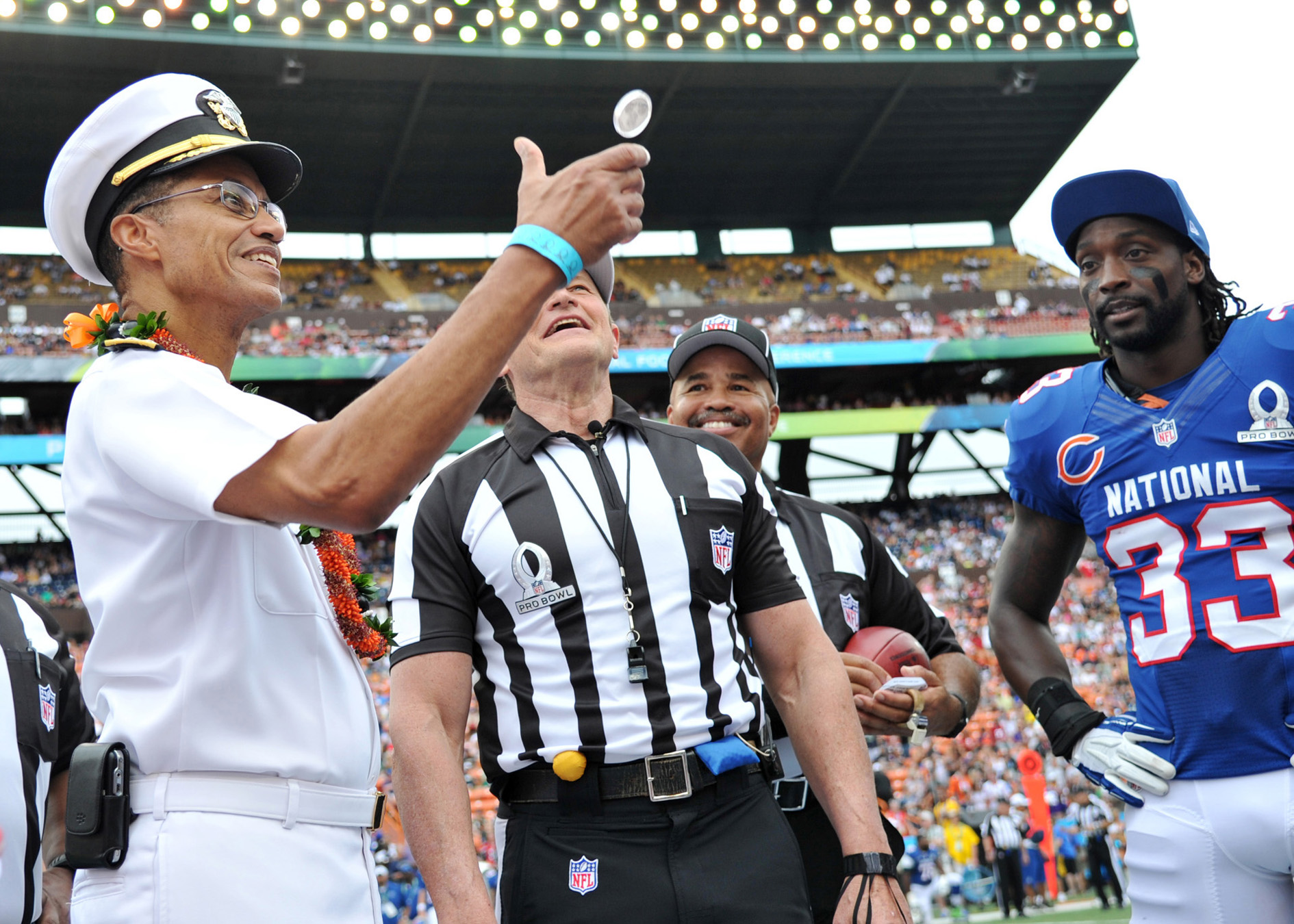
Cecil D. Haney flips the coin at the 2013 Pro Bowl.

=== Coin toss ===
Three minutes before the start of the game, the referee meets with captains from both teams for a coin toss. The visiting team calls the toss before the coin is flipped. The winner of the toss may defer their choice to the start of the second half, or they may take the first choice of:

1. Receiving the kickoff to start the game, or kicking off to start the game
2. Choosing an end of the field to defend in the first quarter (with the teams switching directions at the end of the first quarter and at the end of the third quarter)

The loser of the toss gets the remaining option. Typically, if the winner of the toss defers, the loser will choose to receive the ball first.

At the start of the second half, the team that did not choose first (either because they deferred their choice or lost the toss) gets the first choice of options.

In college games, the team that wins the toss defers their choice to the start of the second half over 90% of the time.

If a game goes to overtime, a coin toss is held before the start of the first overtime period but not subsequent overtime periods. In college, for example, the loser of the coin toss to start overtime has the first choice in the second overtime period. The choices available to the captains in overtime vary according to the NFL, college, and various states' high school rules.

In high school, the coin toss may be held earlier before the start of the game between the captains or coaches. Three minutes before kickoff, the captains meet for a simulated coin toss, and the referee announces the results of the earlier toss.

==== XFL ====
The original incarnation of the XFL did not implement a coin toss; instead, an event took place called the "opening scramble", in which one player from each team fought to recover a football 20 yards away to determine possession. Both players lined up side-by-side on one of the 30-yard lines, with the ball being placed at the 50-yard line. At the whistle, the two players would run toward the ball and attempt to gain possession. Whichever player gained possession first was allowed to choose possession (as if he had won a coin toss in other leagues).

The XFL's second incarnation also did not feature coin tosses. Instead, the home team was given the option to kick off, receive, select a goal, or defer to the second half. In the event of overtime, the visiting team was given the choice of going first or second or selecting which end zone to attack (with the home team getting the other choice).

=== Downed player ===
The rules vary from the college level to the professional level. In the NFL, unless a player is tagged by an opposing player or gives himself up, he is not down. A player carrying the ball (the runner) is downed when any of the following occurs:

- Any part of the runner other than his hands or feet touches the ground. Ankles and wrists count as downed. This may be as a result of:
  - Contact by an opponent (down by contact) where the opponent tackles the runner by pushing him, grasping him and pulling him to the ground, sliding into his legs, or touching him in any manner before any part of the runner other than his hands or feet touching the ground. Unlike in other sports, if the opposing player fails to down the ball carrier, it is merely an attempted tackle. If the ball carrier falls onto another player but doesn't touch the ground, he can still get up and keep playing. A player on the ground is not considered part of the ground.
  - Intentionally downing the ball: intentionally kneeling, verbally declaring "I'm Down" (except in college), or similar actions. For example, to protect himself from violent hits by opponents attempting to tackle him, the quarterback may choose to slide to the ground feet-first. This slide is interpreted as intentionally downing the ball, and opponents may be penalized for hitting him.
  - In amateur football, a runner is downed when any part of his body other than his hands or feet touches the ground at any time (unless he is the holder for a place kick). In professional football, the runner is not down for such accidental contact; he must be down by contact with an opponent as described above.
- The runner goes out of bounds: if any part of his body (including his hands or feet) touches the ground or anything other than another player or an official on or past a sideline or an endline. The sideline is considered out of bounds, so the runner is deemed out of bounds if he steps on or touches any part of it. A runner may carry the ball in such a manner that it is over the sideline, so long as the ball or runner does not touch anything out of bounds.
- The runner's forward progress toward the opponent's goal line is stopped by contact with an opponent, with little chance to be resumed: the exact moment at which the player's forward progress stops is subject to the judgment of the officials. In particular, for the protection of the quarterback, he is considered down as soon as an official judges that he is in the grasp of an opponent behind the line of scrimmage and the tackling defensive player(s) will be awarded a sack. The ball is then spotted where the player's forward progress is stopped.

== Scrimmage downs ==
The majority of a football game takes place on plays (downs) that begin at the line of scrimmage, the vertical plane from sideline to sideline that passes through the point of the ball. The officials spot the ball (place it in a designated spot on the field) on the line of scrimmage and declare it ready for play.

The width of the spotted football defines the width of the neutral zone, an area of the field no player other than the snapper may position himself in or above before the snap.

=== Positions ===
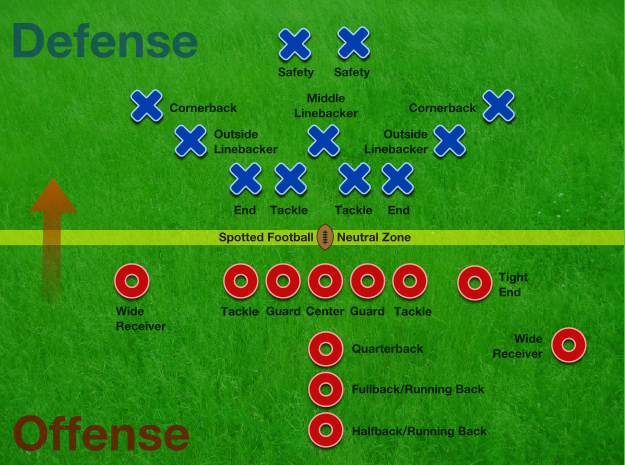
A formation at the line of scrimmage. Offensive players are marked by O symbols, defensive players by X symbols. This diagram shows two of the most common formations, the offense is in the I formation while the defense is in the 4–3 formation. There are many different formations the players may take.

A typical offense is made up of a quarterback, five offensive linemen, two wide receivers, a running back, a fullback, and a tight end, however teams will vary their personnel on the field to fit any given play.

The quarterback functions as the leader of the offense. It is most often their responsibility to pass along the play called to the other offensive players in the huddle before any given play and call the snap count for the ball to enter play. The quarterback is also the primary ball-handler on offense. Once the ball is hiked into play, it is their job to either hand the ball off to one of their running backs or scout the field for an open receiver to throw the ball to. In some instances, the quarterback will run the ball themselves.

The quarterback is guarded by their offensive linemen, known collectively as the offensive line. The offensive line is made up of a left and right tackle, a left and right guard, and a center. The offensive line has two different jobs. When the offense runs a pass play, their job is to guard the quarterback from the defense rushing the quarterback. When the offense runs a run play, their job is to clear a path for the running back to run through. Additionally, it is the center's responsibility to hike the ball to the quarterback at the beginning of each play.

The running back has multiple roles: they can take the ball from the quarterback and run, move up and help the offensive line block, or go out to catch a pass. While the role of the fullback is deteriorating in professional leagues, it is their primary responsibility to block for the running back. Running backs and fullbacks are sometimes also called halfbacks, wingbacks, or slotbacks.

Similarly to the running back, the tight end also has multiple roles. They will either help the offensive line protect the quarterback, block on run plays, or run or catch the ball themselves.

The primary role of wide receivers is to run out into the field of play and catch the ball, although they may also block in some instances such as during a run play or when another wide receiver catches the ball.

The players on offense must arrange themselves in a formation, all behind their line of scrimmage (that is, on their side of the ball). For reasons of safety and competitive balance, there are strict rules that define how the offensive players may line up. Seven players must line up directly on the line of scrimmage while four players line up behind the line of scrimmage. Within this formation, six eligible receivers may receive a forward pass during play. These eligible receivers are the running back, fullback, tight end, or wide receivers. The remaining five linemen, often called interior linemen do not normally handle the ball during a play. Because of these rules, various leagues have enacted strict rules of uniform numbering so officials may more easily judge which players were eligible and which were not at the start of a play. For example, in college football, ineligible players wear numbers 50–79, while eligible receivers wear 1–49 or 80–99. Even within this structure, offenses can still present a wide number of formations, so long as they maintain the "seven and four" arrangement. Receivers, for example, may play close to the other linemen or play some distance down the line of scrimmage, where they would sometimes be called split ends. Of the four backs, they may play behind the linemen or may play "split out" to provide additional wide receivers. These additional receivers can be flankers (if they play split far wide, but still in the backfield) or slot receivers if they play in the "slot" between the split end and the rest of the offensive line.

The players on defense may arrange themselves in any manner, as long as all players are "behind the line" (that is, on the side of the line nearest their own end zone). Players who line up opposite the offensive line are called defensive linemen, usually with one or two defensive tackles in the middle (a single defensive tackle is often called the nose guard or nose tackle) and with one defensive end on each side. A defensive lineman's job is typically to put pressure on the opposing team's quarterback by rushing the offensive line. The defensive line is also most often the first set of players the opponent must get through should they choose to run the ball. Behind the linemen are the linebackers. A linebacker's job can be any number of things, including trying to rush the opposing team's quarterback, stopping the opponents running back on run plays, or covering the opponent's tight end or wide receivers. Positioned opposite the wide receivers are the cornerbacks. Their primary responsibility is to cover the wide receivers. Farthest back from the line are the safeties, usually in the middle of the field behind the linebackers. The safeties are the last line of defense against the opponent. Like a linebacker, a safety's role can vary, however, their most common role is to help the cornerbacks cover the opponent's wide receivers, which is called "double coverage". The linemen and linebackers close to the line of scrimmage, are often referred to as playing "in the box". Players outside "the box" (usually cornerbacks and safeties) are collectively referred to as the "secondary".

=== Starting the down ===
A scrimmage down begins with a snap, where the center throws or hands the ball back to one of the backs, usually the quarterback. The quarterback then either hands the ball off to a back, throws the ball, or runs with it himself. The down ends when the ball becomes dead (see below). The ball is typically next spotted where the ball became dead; however, if it became dead outside the hash marks, it is brought in on the same yard line to the nearest hash mark. This spot establishes the lines of scrimmage for the next play. In the case of an incomplete forward pass, the ball is returned to the spot where it was last snapped to begin the next play. A fumbled ball that goes out of bounds is declared dead and possession remains with the team that most recently had control of the ball.

=== Dead ball ===
The ball becomes dead, and the down ends, when:

- the ball carrier is downed, as described above;
- under college rules only, the ball carrier fakes a slide to the ground;
- a forward pass falls incomplete (it touches the ground before possession is secured by a player);
- the ball carrier or ball touches the sideline or end line or otherwise goes outside the field of play ("out of bounds");
- the ball carrier or the ball, except on a scoring field goal attempt, hits any part of the goalpost (even if it bounces back onto the field);
- a team scores;
- a kick receiver makes a fair catch (waving his arm above his head to signal a fair catch, where the kicking team is not allowed to interfere with him or hit him after the catch, but in return, he is not allowed to run), or a member of the receiving team gains possession after a fair catch signal was given;
- a member of the kicking team possesses a kicked ball beyond the line of scrimmage (e.g. "downing" a punt allowed to roll by the receiving team by holding it to stop its roll);
- a kicked ball comes to rest;
- a touchback occurs; or
- under NFL or college rules, on fourth down (or, in the NFL, on any down after the two-minute warning in either half/overtime), a ball fumbled forward by the offensive team is recovered by an offensive team player other than the fumbler.

The nearest official typically blows his whistle after the ball becomes dead to alert the players that the down has already ended. If the ball is alive and the official sounds an inadvertent whistle, then the ball still becomes dead, but the team in possession of the ball may elect to have the down replayed or take the spot where the ball was declared dead. If the ball was loose from a fumble, then the ball can be put into play at the spot of the fumble. If the ball was in flight from a kick or a pass, then the down is always replayed.

== Free kick downs ==
A free kick is a down that does not occur from scrimmage. The kicking team begins behind the ball, while the receiving team must remain at least 10 yards downfield before the ball is kicked.

=== Kickoffs ===
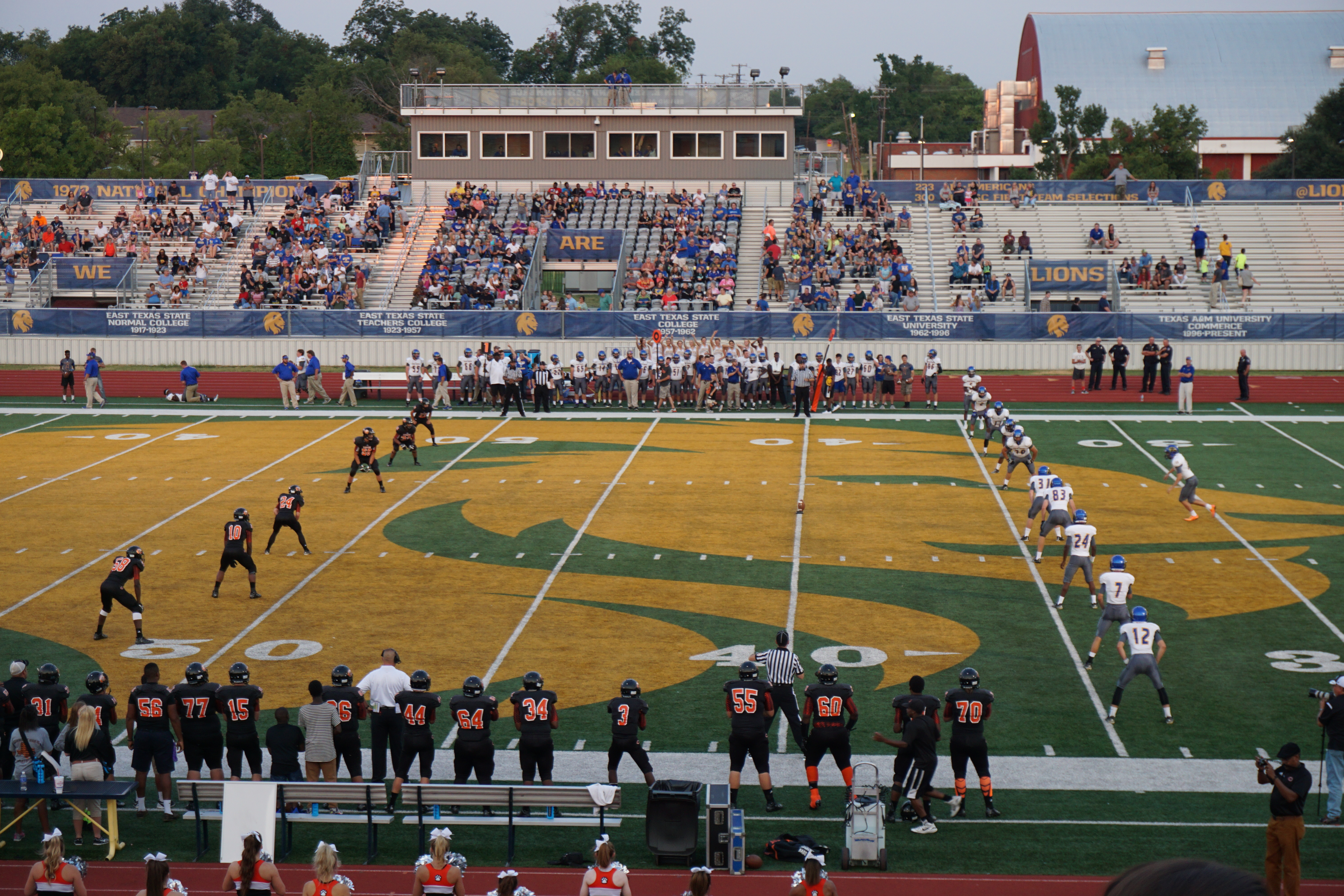
Kickoff for High school

A kickoff is a type of free kick where the ball is placed on a tee (or held) at the kicking team's 35-yard line (or 40 for high school).

For the 2024 NFL season, kickoffs were overhauled to limit injuries and promote returns, utilizing a similar system to the UFL. The new rules created a "Landing Zone" between the receiving team's end zone and 20-yard line. If the kick lands in the landing zone, the kick must be returned. If the kick lands short of landing zone or out of bounds, the ball is placed on the receiving team's 40-yard line. If the kick lands in the landing zone and bounces into the end zone, it can be returned or downed, and if it's downed, the ball is spotted at the receiving team's 20-yard line. If the kick lands in the end zone, it can be returned or downed, and if downed, the ball is spotted at the receiving team's 35-yard line. If the kick goes out of the back of the end zone, the ball is spotted at the receiving team's 35-yard line. The new rules also changed the alignment of the players. All kicking team players other than the kicker line up on the receiving team’s 40-yard line. At least 9 of the receiving team's players line up between the receiving team’s 35 to the 30-yard line (known as the "Setup Zone"), with at least 7 players with one foot on the receiving team’s 35-yard line (known as the "Restraining Line"). No more than 2 of the receiving team's players may line up in the landing zone. The kicker cannot cross the 50-yard line until the ball touches the ground or a player in the landing zone or end zone. The kicking team players and all players in the setup zone cannot move until the ball hits the ground or a player in the landing zone or the end zone. The returners in the landing zone can move at any time before or during the kick. The new rules also limited onside kicks to the fourth quarter and must be declared by the kicking team.

In high school and college, the ball is kicked from the 40 and 35-yard line respectively. Players on the kickoff coverage team (apart from the kicker) cannot line up more than 5 yards behind the kickoff line. The kicking team's players may not cross this line until the ball is kicked; members of the non-kicking (or "receiving") team are similarly restrained behind a line 10 yards further downfield (the 45-yard line, or 50 for high school). A valid kickoff must travel at least this 10-yard distance to the receiving team's restraining line, after which any player of either team may catch or pick up the ball and try to advance it (a member of the kicking team may only recover a kickoff and may not advance it) before being downed. In most cases, the ball is kicked as far as possible (typically 40 to 70 yards), after which a player of the receiving team is usually able to secure possession (since the members of the kicking team cannot start downfield until after the ball is kicked). Occasionally, for tactical reasons, the kicking team may instead choose to attempt an onside kick, in which the kicker tries to kick the ball along the ground just over the required 10-yard distance in such a manner that one of his own teammates can recover the ball for the kicking side. If it is touched before ten yards, the ball is dead and a re-kick or spot of the ball will be rewarded to the receiving team.

==== Receiving a kickoff ====
A member of the receiving team gaining possession of the ball on a kickoff may attempt to advance it as far as he can toward the kicking team's goal line before being downed. Once the ball carrier is downed, the play is whistled dead and the ball is placed by the officials at the point where the play ended; this spot then becomes the line of scrimmage for the ensuing play. A kick that travels through or goes out of bounds within the end zone without being touched, or is caught by the receiving team in the end zone but not advanced out of it, results in a touchback; the ball is then placed at the receiving team's 25-yard line, which becomes the line of scrimmage. In college football only, a fair catch by the receiving team between its own 25-yard line and the goal line is treated as a touchback, with the ball placed at the 25.

A kickoff that goes out of bounds anywhere other than the end zone before being touched by the receiving team is an illegal kick: the receiving team has the option of having the ball re-kicked from five yards closer to the kicking team's goal line, or they may choose to take possession of the ball at the point where it went out of bounds or 25 yards from the spot of the kick in high school and college, whichever is more advantageous.

=== Other free kicks ===
A free-kick is also used to restart the game following a safety. The team that was trapped in its own end zone, therefore conceding two points to the other team, kicks the ball from its own 20-yard line. This can be a place kick, drop-kick, or punt.

In the NFL and high school, a free kick may be taken on the play immediately after a fair catch; see "fair catch kick" below.

== Scoring ==
=== Scrimmage plays and kickoffs ===
Most standard football plays are considered scrimmage plays, initiated from a line of scrimmage. Exceptions are kickoffs and try plays (below). Although similar rules apply during a try play, the number of points awarded for each score differs on a try play.

==== Touchdown (6 points) ====
A touchdown is earned when a player has legal possession of the ball and the ball touches or goes over the imaginary vertical plane above the opposing team's goal line. After a touchdown, the scoring team attempts a try play for 1 or 2 points (see below). A successful touchdown is signaled by an official extending both arms vertically above the head. A touchdown is worth six points, except in the defunct WFL where it was worth seven points.

For statistical purposes, the player who advances the ball into or catches it in the end zone is credited with the touchdown. If a forward pass was thrown on the play, the throwing player is credited with a passing touchdown.

==== Field goal (3 points) ====
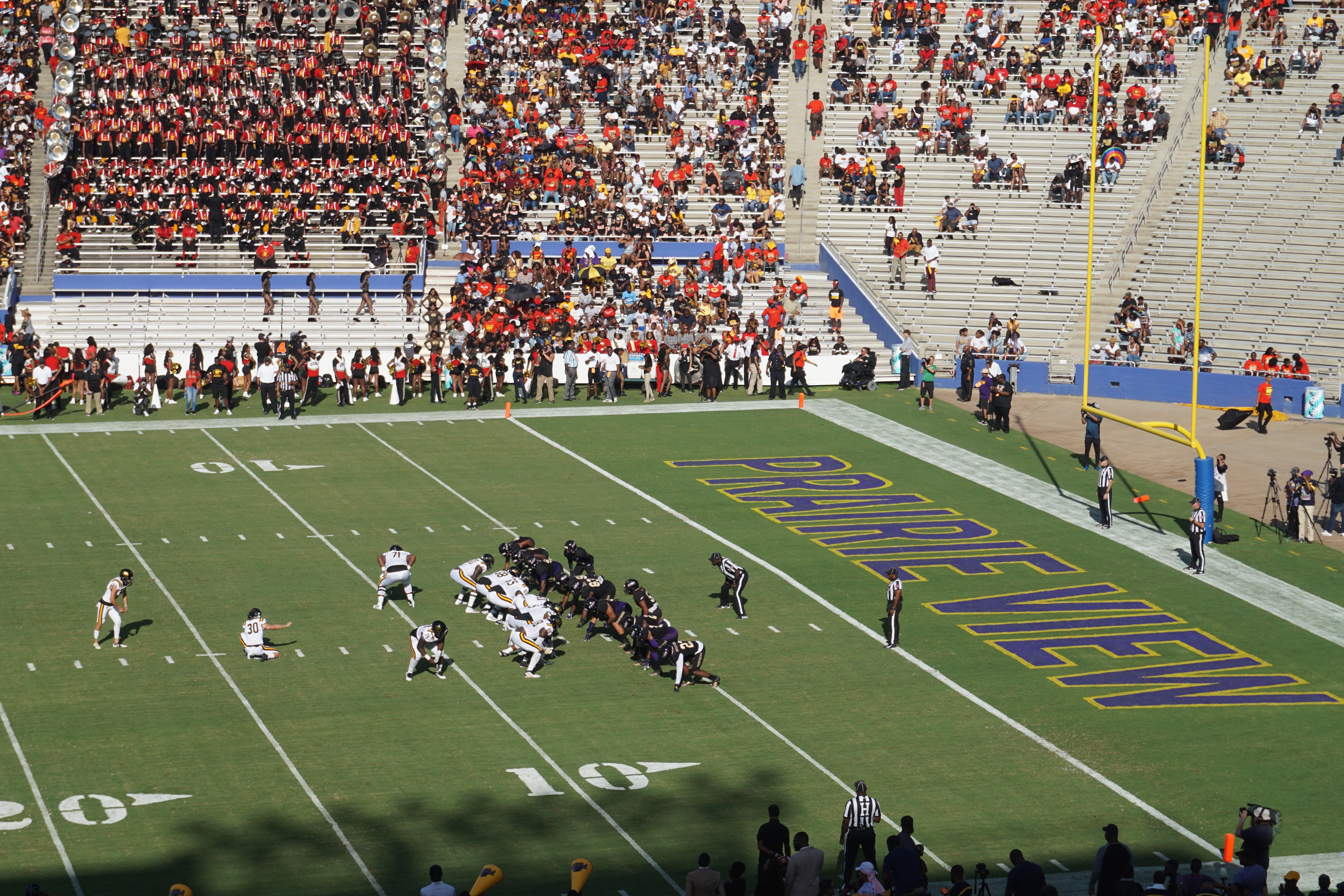
Field goal attempt

A field goal is scored when the ball is place kicked, drop kicked, or free kicked after a fair catch or awarded fair catch (High School or NFL only) between the goalposts behind the opponent's end zone. The most common type of kick used is the place kick. For a place kick, the ball must first be snapped to a placeholder, who holds the ball upright on the ground with his fingertip so that it may be kicked. Three points are scored if the ball crosses between the two upright posts and above the crossbar and remains over. If a field goal is missed, the ball is returned to the original line of scrimmage (in the NFL, to the spot of the kick; in high school, to the 20-yard line if the ball enters the end zone, or otherwise where the ball becomes dead after the kick) or to the 20-yard line if that is further from the goal line, and possession is given to the other team. If the ball does not go out of bounds, the other team may catch the kicked ball and attempt to advance it, but this is usually not advantageous. One official is positioned under each goalpost; if either one rules the field goal no good, then the field goal is unsuccessful. A successful field goal is signaled by an official extending both arms vertically above the head. A team that successfully kicks a field goal kicks off to the opposing team on the next play.

==== Safety (2 points) ====
The uncommon safety is scored if a player causes the ball to become dead in their own end zone; two points are awarded to the opposing (usually defending) team. This can happen if a player is either downed or goes out of bounds in the end zone while carrying the ball, or if he fumbles the ball, and it goes out of bounds in the end zone. Safety is also awarded to the defensive team if the offensive team commits a foul which is enforced in its own end zone. A safety is not awarded if a player intercepts a pass or receives a kick in his own end zone and is downed there. This situation, in which the opponent caused the ball to enter the end zone, is called a touchback; no points are scored, and the team that gained possession of the ball is awarded possession at its own 25-yard line. If the interception or reception occurs outside the end zone, and the player is carried into the end zone by momentum, the ball is placed at the spot of the catch, and no safety is awarded. A safety is signaled by a referee holding both palms together above the head, fingertips pointing upwards. After a safety, the team that conceded the safety kicks a free kick (which may be a punt, place kick, or drop-kick) from its 20-yard line.

=== Try plays ===
A try play (as opposed to a regular scrimmage play or kickoff), more commonly referred to as an extra-point attempt, PAT (abbreviation of "point after touchdown"), conversion attempt, or two-point conversion attempt, based on the scoring team's intentions on the play, is awarded to the scoring team immediately following a touchdown. This un-timed down is an opportunity to score additional points.

- Although the game clock is not advanced during a try play, the play clock is enforced. A delay of game penalty, false start, or similar penalty, by the offense results in a 5-yard penalty assessed for the try. Typically, penalties charged against the defense give the offensive two options: half the distance to the goal for the try, or assessing the full penalty on the ensuing kickoff. Since the trial is not timed by the game clock, if a touchdown is scored as regulation time expires (and game clock subsequently reads 0:00.0), the try is still allowed to be conducted. After the Minneapolis Miracle in 2018, the NFL implemented a rule that if a team scores on the final play of the game, and extra points would not change the result, the PAT will no longer be conducted.

==== Extra point (field goal - 1 point) ====
The offensive team may attempt to kick the ball through the goalposts, in the same manner, that a field goal is kicked during a scrimmage play. In the NFL, the ball is spotted at the 15-yard line. In college and high school, the ball is spotted at the 3-yard line. If successful, the team is awarded 1 point, referred to as an extra point. This option is almost always chosen because a two-point conversion attempt is much riskier. Since the extra point is almost always successful, sportscasters will often refer to a team-up or trailing by seven (not six) points as being "up/trailing by a touchdown". In the NFL you are allowed to jump over the center, however this is not allowed in college and high school.

==== Two-point conversion (touchdown - 2 points) ====
The offensive team may attempt to advance the ball via run or pass into the end zone, much like a touchdown on the extra-point attempt, except that it receives two points. This is called a two-point conversion. If the offense elects to attempt a two-point conversion on the try play, the ball is spotted at the 2-yard line in the NFL and on the 3-yard line for college and high school. The success rate for two-point conversions is about 48 percent in the NFL, making the two-point conversion attempt a risky tactic; thus it is usually attempted only when two points will help the team but one point will not.

- For example, suppose that it is late in the game with a score of 21–10 and the losing team scores a touchdown, making the score 21–16. The scoring team will usually attempt the two-point conversion because if successful, a three-point deficit later could be matched with one field goal; failure to convert would result in a five-point deficit that could be surmounted with another touchdown – a situation no worse than the four-point deficit achieved with a kicked extra point.
- Another example would be if a team scores a late-game touchdown, and as a result is down by two points. A successful two-point conversion would tie the game and likely force overtime. In very rare and risky instances, a trailing team who scored a touchdown, and as a result is down by 1 point, may attempt a two-point conversion to gamble on a win and avoid overtime (or, under NCAA or NFHS rules, a subsequent overtime period). Two famous examples of this gamble were by Nebraska in the last minute of the 1984 Orange Bowl (unsuccessful) and by Boise State in the first overtime of the 2007 Fiesta Bowl (successful). Under NCAA rules, teams are required to "go for two" starting with double overtime.

===== Defensive conversion =====
Under college, NFL & UFL rules, if the defensive team gains possession and advances the ball the length of the field into the opposite end zone on the try play (via interception or a fumble recovery, or by blocking a kick and legally recovering the ball), they score two points. This is officially recorded as a defensive conversion scored by the defense. The NCAA adopted this rule in 1988; the NFL added this in 2015; the UFL, 2024.

- This scenario cannot occur under high school football rules except in Texas, which bases its rules on the college ruleset. Outside of Texas, the ball is ruled dead and the try is over immediately when the defense gains possession.

==== Safety (1 point) ====
A safety scored on a try play is worth one point. This can occur when, for example, the defense gains control of the ball and advances it into the field of play, but then retreats into its own end zone when play is stopped. Similarly, the defense could recover a fumble in its own end zone before play is stopped. A safety on a try play could also be awarded to the defense if the defense takes possession of the ball during a try play, advances it all the way down to the opposite end of the field, where the offensive team then regains possession before the play is declared dead in that end zone.

The one point safety is the most rare type of score in American football. It has never occurred in NFL play, and has occurred four times in NCAA division 1 football.

Since a one-point safety cannot occur unless the other team at least scores a touchdown a final score of 0–1 to 5-1 and 7–1 are not possible in American football, though a final score of 6-1 or 8-1 or higher is.

==== Officials signals on try plays ====
The officials' signal for a successful try, whether an extra point or a two-point conversion, is the same as for a touchdown. The officials' signal for a safety on a try play is also the same as on a scrimmage play.

After the try, the team that scored the touchdown kicks off to the opposing team. Unlike a safety that occurs on a scrimmage play, no free-kick is awarded following a safety on a try play.

==== Try play rules in overtime ====
During sudden-death over time, particularly in the NFL, if a team scores a touchdown in the overtime period, the game is immediately over, and the try is ignored.

In NCAA overtime, if the second team to possess the ball in the overtime scores a touchdown which puts them ahead of the opponent in points, the game is immediately over, and the try is ignored.

=== Fair catch kick ===
A free-kick (see above) may be taken on the play immediately after any fair catch of a punt. In the NFL, if the receiving team elects to attempt this and time expired during the punt, the half/overtime is extended with an untimed down. The ball must be held on the ground by a member of the kicking team or drop kicked; a tee may not be used. (High school kickers may use a tee). This is both a field goal attempt and a free-kick; if the ball is kicked between the goalposts, three points are scored for the kicking team. This is the only case where a free kick may score points. This method of scoring is extremely rare, last successfully completed in the NFL by Cameron Dicker in 2024. It is only advantageous when a team catches a very short punt with very little time left. A team is unlikely to be punting with only a few seconds left in a half or overtime, and it is rarer still for punts to be caught near field goal range. The officials' signal for a successful fair catch kick is the same as for a field goal.

==== Defunct leagues ====
- In the WFL, PAT's were called "Action Points" and could only be scored via a run or pass play (as opposed to by kick as in the NFL), and were worth one point. The ball was placed on the two-and-a-half -yard line for an Action Point. This rule was a revival of a 1968 preseason experiment by the NFL and American Football League. The XFL's first incarnation employed a similar rule in which teams ran a single offensive down from the two-yard line (functionally identical to the NFL/NCAA/CFL two-point conversion), also for one point. By the playoffs, two-point and three-point conversions had been added to the rules. Teams could opt for the bonus points by playing the conversion farther back from the goal line. This rule remains intact in the current UFL.

== Officiating ==
The game is officiated by a crew of three to seven officials. Every crew will consist of a referee, who is generally in charge of the game and watches the action on the quarterback and in the offensive backfield; an umpire, who handles spotting the ball and watches the action on the offensive line; and a head linesman, who supervises the placement of the down box and line-to-gain chains. The crew may also consist of a line judge, back judge, field judge and side judge, in the order listed: i.e. a crew of five officials have a referee, umpire, head linesman, line judge, and back judge.

Officials are selected by the teams in advance or appointed by the governing league. While the majority of officials at lower levels only officiate games on a part-time basis, the NFL is implementing a new system where seven officials will become full-time employees of the league, one for each official position (i.e. back judge, field judge, side judge, etc.). In the other three major North American professional sports leagues – Major League Baseball, the NBA and NHL – officials are employed by their respective leagues. The sheer volume of games in the other three sports necessitates full-time officials; since 2021, the NFL regular season is only 17 games long, compared to 162 games for MLB and 82 for the NBA and NHL.

During the game, the officials are assisted in the administration of the game by other persons, including a clock operator to start and stop the game clock (and possibly also the play clock); a chain crew who hold the down indicator and the line-to-gain chains on the sideline; and ball boys, who provide footballs to officials between downs (e.g. a dry ball each down on a wet day). These individuals may be provided by the teams involved – it is common for a high school coach's son or daughter to act as a ball boy for the team.

== Fouls and their penalties ==
Because football is a high-contact sport requiring a balance between offense and defense, many rules exist that regulate equality, safety, contact, and actions of players on each team. It is very difficult to always avoid violating these rules without giving up too much of an advantage. Thus, an elaborate system of fouls and penalties has been developed to "let the punishment fit the crime" and maintain a balance between following the rules and keeping a good flow of the game. Players are constantly looking for ways to find an advantage that stretches the limitations imposed by the rules. Also, the frequency and severity of fouls can make a large difference in the outcome of a game, so coaches are constantly looking for ways to minimize the number and severity of infractions committed by their players.

It is a common misconception that the term "penalty" is used to refer both to an infraction and the penal consequence of that infraction. A foul is a rule infraction for which a penalty is prescribed. Some of the more common fouls are listed below. In most cases when a foul occurs, the offending team will be assessed a penalty of 5, 10, or 15 yards, depending on the foul. Also, in most cases, if the foul is committed while the ball is in play, the down will be replayed from the new position (for example, if the offense commits a foul on a first-down play, the next play will still be first down, but the offense may have to go 15 yards, or farther, to achieve another first down.) But if a defensive foul results in the ball advancing beyond the offense's first-down objective, the next play will be the first down of a new series. Some penalties (typically for more serious fouls), however, require a loss of down for the offense; and some defensive fouls may result in an automatic first down regardless of the ball position.

In all cases (except for ejection of a player or, in rare cases, forfeiture of the game), the non-offending team is given the option of declining the penalty and letting the result of the play stand (although the Referee may exercise this option on their behalf when it is obvious), if they believe it to be more to their advantage. For some fouls by the defense, the penalty is applied in addition to the yardage gained on the play. Most personal fouls, which involve danger to another player, carry 15-yard penalties; in rare cases, they result in offending players being ejected from the game. In the NFL, if a defensive foul occurs after time has expired at the end of a half, the half will be continued for a single, untimed play from scrimmage. Under college rules, any accepted penalty when the time has expired at the end of any quarter results in an extension for one untimed down.

In the NFL, with three exceptions, no penalty may move the ball more than half the distance toward the penalized team's goal line. These exceptions are defensive pass interference (see the discussion of that foul for more details), intentional grounding, and offensive holding – but in this last case, the exception pertains only if the infraction occurs within the offensive team's own end zone, in which case an automatic safety is assessed (intentional grounding from the end zone also carries an automatic safety). Under college rules, the same half-the-distance principle applies, but any offensive fouls involving contact in their end zone (e.g. holding, illegal blocking or personal fouls) result in a safety.

The neutral zone is the space between the two free-kick lines during a free-kick down and between the two scrimmage lines during a scrimmage down. For a free-kick down, the neutral zone is 10 yards wide and for a scrimmage down it is as wide as the length of the football. It is established when the ball is marked ready for play. No player may legally be in the neutral zone except for the snapper on scrimmage downs, and no one except the kicker and the holder for free kick downs.

== Timeouts ==
Each team receives three timeouts per half (if the game goes to overtime, each team receives additional timeouts), making for a total of six timeouts per team in a regulation game. Unused timeouts may not carry over to the second half or overtime. In professional football, a team must have at least one remaining timeout to challenge an official's call.

== Instant replay ==
In the NFL, a number of rulings can be reviewed by officials or challenged by coaches. If a coach wants to challenge a play, he must do so before the next play begins, and he does so by throwing a red flag similar to the officials' yellow flags. Coaches are allowed two challenges per game and are granted a third if their first two are successful. The team loses a timeout if they lose the challenge. Therefore, they cannot challenge if they do not have timeouts. Plays within the two-minute-warning and overtime cannot be challenged; any review must be initiated by a replay official off-field. The referee performs the actual review via a video screen on the sideline. The referee will announce the result of instant replay reviews over his wireless microphone.

Beginning in the 2011 NFL Season, an instant replay review by the booth official became automatic for every play ruled by the referees on the field to have scored points. This was seen as another step in the "modernization" of sports. Every scoring play was reviewed, which saved coaches from using up their challenges on close plays in the endzone. Since the 2012 season, the booth official also reviews all turnovers during the game.

In college, coaches are allowed one challenge per game by first requesting a timeout. Otherwise, a replay official in the press box observes all plays. If he deems a ruling may be in error, he notifies the officials on the field to interrupt the game before the beginning of the next play. The replay official performs the review and relays the decision to the referee, who announces the result. Not every conference employs replay, which is optional.

High school rules generally do not provide for a video review of any decisions by officials during a game. By state adoption, replay may be used in a state championship game. At all times, the use of television or videotape for coaching purposes during the game is prohibited. If a coach feels a rule has been misinterpreted, he may call a timeout and request a coach-referee conference to discuss the ruling with the referee, but no replay equipment will be consulted during the conference.

== Major rule differences between NFL and college football ==
Some of the major rule differences between NFL and college football include:

	NFL	College football
Feet in-bounds required for a completed pass	Two	One
Down-by-contact rule	Yes, a player is active until he is tackled or forced down by a member of the opposing team	No, a player is automatically ruled down when any part of his body other than the feet or hands touches the ground
Penalty for defensive pass interference	Automatic first down at the spot of the foul	Automatic first down, with the lesser of 15 yards from the previous spot or the spot of the foul
Clock temporarily stops after a first down	No	Yes, during the final two minutes of each half
Line of scrimmage following a missed field goal	The greater of the spot of the kick or the opposing team's 20-yard line	The greater of the previous line of scrimmage or opposing team's 20-yard line
Starting point of a one- or two-point conversion	2-yard line on 2-point conversions; 15-yard line on 1-point conversions	3-yard line
Overtime	Modified sudden death: both teams get the opportunity to possess the ball in overtime; if kicking team scores a safety on first possession, the game is over; otherwise, whoever is ahead after one possession wins it. Should the tie persist following a possession by each team, whoever scores next wins it. In the regular season, only one 10-minute overtime is played and games may end in a tie. Postseason games play multiple 15-minute periods until there is a winner.	Each team is given one possession from its opponent's twenty-five-yard line with no game clock (first 2 possessions; thereafter, from the opponent's 3-yard line). The team leading after both possessions is declared the winner. If the teams remain tied, this procedure is repeated once more; if a touchdown is scored, they must attempt a two-point conversion. After double overtime, and if the score is still tied, all subsequent overtime possessions consist solely of two-point conversions. Games may not end in a tie.
Instant replay	Coaches are issued two challenges to request a review for all other plays. A third challenge is awarded if at least one is successful. Plays during the final two minutes of each half and all overtime periods are subject only to booth review. All turnovers and plays ruled on the field to have scored points are automatically reviewed regardless of game time. Coaches are not allowed to challenge in either situation and may risk an unsportsmanlike conduct penalty if they attempt to do so; coaches cannot be disqualified on second unsportsmanlike.	Each coach receives only one challenge. If that challenge is successful, a second challenge is allowed. All plays are subject to booth reviews.
Placement of ball following a touchback	Following kickoffs or free kicks after a safety: a kickoff that lands in the landing zone and bounces into the endzone is live and must be returned or downed. If downed, the ball is placed on the receiving team's 20-yard line. If a kickoff goes out of the back of the endzone, the ball is placed on the receiving team's 30-yard line. All other touchback situations: 20-yard line of the team receiving possession	Receiving team's 25-yard line, except that a fair catch on a kickoff or free-kick after a safety between the receiving team's 25-yard line and the goal line is treated as a touchback, with the ball placed on the 25

== See also ==
- Comparison of American and Canadian football
- 1941 Oklahoma City vs. Youngstown football game, first use of the penalty flag
