= Hurry-up offense =

American football offensive style

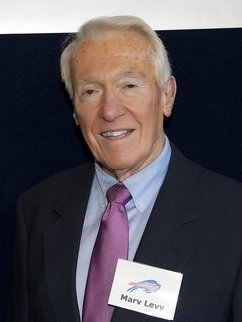
Marv Levy, head coach of the Buffalo Bills from 1986 to 1997, who incorporated the hurry-up offense

The hurry-up offense is an American football offensive style, which has two different but related forms in which the offensive team avoids delays between plays. The hurry-up, no-huddle offense (HUNH) refers to avoiding or shortening the huddle to limit or disrupt defensive strategies and flexibility. The two-minute drill is a clock-management strategy that may limit huddles but also emphasizes plays that stop the game clock. While the two-minute drill refers to parts of the game with little time remaining on the game clock, the no-huddle may be used in some form at any time. The no-huddle offense was pioneered by the Cincinnati Bengals and reached its most famous and complete usage by the Buffalo Bills, nicknamed the "K-Gun", during the 1990s under head coach Marv Levy and offensive coordinator Ted Marchibroda. Coach Gus Malzahn was known for helping popularize this offense style of combining both the hurry-up and no-huddle offenses, publishing a book called The Hurry-Up, No Huddle: An Offensive Philosophy (2003). He helped pioneer and popularize it at the high school and collegiate levels through his success with the style.

== No-huddle offense ==
The no-huddle offense is usually employed as part of a hurry-up offense, but it is not necessarily an attempt to snap the ball (begin the play) more quickly. Rather, the lack of huddle allows the offense to threaten to snap the ball quickly, denying the defending team time to substitute players and communicate effectively between coaches and players. When operating in the no-huddle, the offense typically lines up in a predetermined formation at scrimmage, possibly with a predetermined play in mind. The quarterback may then call an audible, altering the play call based on a perceived weakness in the defense's response. Some teams use this methodology to react to the defense and will remain at this pre-snap state for a considerable time as the clock runs down, providing a stream of actual and counterfeit play changes. Between 2007 and 2012, the use of the no-huddle offense in the NFL increased 100%.

=== Development as a standard method ===
The hurry-up offense is nearly as old as football itself. Huddles used to not exist. Michigan coach Fielding Yost was known as "Hurry up;" as he had Bennie Owen call signals for the next play even while still lying beneath the tackle pile from the previous snap. John Heisman's 1899 Auburn Tigers team was noted for its speed.

The first team to employ a version of the no-huddle approach as the normal offensive play strategy was the 1988 Cincinnati Bengals under Sam Wyche with Boomer Esiason as the quarterback. This approach, called the "attack offense", involved a number of strategies including shortened huddles and huddling much closer to the line of scrimmage than usual. The no-huddle approach was used by many teams before but in specific situations for a limited time. This strategy proved to be very effective in limiting substitutions, creating fatigue in the opposing defense, creating play-calling issues for the defense, and various other advantages. The Bengals' regular employment of this offense was extremely effective. The employment of this version of the "no-huddle" propelled the Bengals to their second appearance in the Super Bowl.

The Buffalo Bills, defeated in the AFC Championship game by the "no-huddle" Bengals, soon adopted this approach. Under head coach Marv Levy and offensive coordinator Ted Marchibroda, the Bills were the first team to truly adopt the no-huddle offense, and with Jim Kelly quarterbacking the no-huddle "K-Gun" offense, the Bills became the only team in NFL history to appear in four consecutive Super Bowls, from 1991–1994. The Bills are considered the only team to ever use the no-huddle offense consistently and completely throughout an entire game for several seasons. Quarterback Jim Kelly would call and signal the plays himself on the field throughout the entire game. The "K-Gun" offense earned a reputation as the most famous and complete hurry-up offense in football. The "K-Gun" offense is commonly thought to be named after quarterback Jim Kelly, but was actually named for Keith McKeller, a 6-foot-6-inch (1.98 m), 245-pound (111 kg) dual-threat tight end. McKeller was an exceptionally fast and agile tight end, and due to coaches and teammates saying he had "killer speed", his nickname on the Bills was "Killer", which was the source of the "K" in "K-Gun".

Peyton Manning, with the Indianapolis Colts and later the Denver Broncos, was best known for this technique, frequently changing the play at the line of scrimmage depending on the coverage that he saw from the opposing defense.

In 2013, Chip Kelly became head coach of the Philadelphia Eagles and adapted the hurry-up offense that he used effectively at Oregon to the NFL. During the 2014 season, the Eagles averaged around 22 seconds per play, which is the fastest time of any NFL team since this statistic has been kept.

In the college game, the hurry-up/no-huddle was employed several times successfully by Auburn coach Gus Malzahn to defeat Nick Saban and the Alabama Crimson Tide. Saban grew frustrated and tried to have the game slowed down to allow his defense to sub players, to no avail. Eventually, Saban had to learn to run the Malzahn offense himself.

=== Differences between the NFL and college approaches ===
While several NFL teams have begun using the offense in various ways, many college football programs have used the no-huddle or hurry-up as a way to gain an advantage when lacking talent in comparison to the teams they are playing. One twist on this approach is that often a college team will hurry-up to the line of scrimmage and line up in a set formation. Based on what the defense is showing in terms of alignment, the quarterback has the option of calling the determined play at the line of scrimmage or stepping back and looking towards the sidelines where the head coach or an assistant will relay a better play to attack the coverage the defense is showing. The Philadelphia Eagles of the NFL have also used this technique with a coach on the sideline telling their quarterback, via the radio receiver in his helmet, information on the defensive alignment; the radio is operative up until 15 seconds on the play clock and hence is only suitable for use when a fast hurry-up offense is used.

== Two-minute drill ==
The two-minute drill is a high-pressure and fast-paced situational strategy where a team will focus on clock management, maximizing the number of plays available for a scoring attempt before a half (or game) expires. The tactics employed during this time involve managing players, substitutions, time-outs, and clock-stopping plays to get as many plays in as possible. In the first half, either team may employ the two-minute drill; however, near the end of the game, only a team tied or losing employs the strategy. Most famously, the two-minute drill references end-of-game drives by a team tied or trailing by one possession.

The two-minute drill is named for the point in the game, frequently after the two minute warning, when it is employed. If significantly more time remains, a team's standard strategies are still viable; if significantly less, a team has little option beyond a Hail Mary pass or the hook and lateral.

Play calling during the two-minute drill emphasizes high probabilities of significant yardage gains or clock stoppages. To help control the clock, teams tend to pass rather than run and to pass near the sidelines rather than the middle of the field. The former provides for incomplete passes while the latter allows the receiver to run out of bounds, both stopping the clock. When plays that do not stop the clock occur, the offense relies on a combination of hurry-up plays and spiking the football – a play where the quarterback stops the clock by immediately throwing the ball into the ground (sacrificing a down by doing so) – and time-outs to minimize time lost. Previously, in college football, the offense was able to temporarily stop the clock by gaining a first down. Due to a rule change beginning in the 2023 season, the clock will now run after gaining a first down, except for the last two minutes of each half.

Finally, as the offense gets closer to scoring, their clock management stance may shift towards running out the clock in an effort to deny the opponent their own opportunity for a two-minute drill.
