= Clock management =

Management of game clock in sports

In gridiron football, clock management is an aspect of game strategy that focuses on the game clock and/or play clock to achieve a desired result, typically near the end of a match. Depending on the game situation, clock management may entail playing in a manner that either slows or quickens the time elapsed from the game clock, to either extend the match or hasten its end. When the desired outcome is to end the match quicker, it is analogous to "running out the clock" (and associated counter-tactics) seen in many sports. Clock management strategies are a significant part of American football, where an elaborate set of rules dictates when the game clock stops between downs, and when it continues to run.

== In American football ==
=== Rules for the game clock ===
Upon kickoff, the clock is started when a member of the receiving team touches the ball, or, if the member of the receiving team touches the ball in their end zone, carries the ball out of the end zone. The clock is stopped when the down ends. (The clock never starts if the receiving team downs the ball in their own end zone for a touchback.) The clock is then restarted when the offense snaps the ball for their first play and continues to run unless one of the following occurs, in which case the clock is stopped at the end of the play and restarts at the next snap unless otherwise provided:

- A player carrying the ball goes out of bounds. The clock stops in all 4 quarters and, for most of the game, it is restarted upon the referee spotting the ball and blowing the whistle to signal the resumption of play. In college football & Texas high school football, the clock restarts upon the snap of the ball when the clock was stopped with less than 2 minutes left in either half. The NFL rule is the same as in the college game for the first half of games, but the clock restarts upon the snap when there is under 5 minutes left in the 4th quarter/overtime. In high school football outside TX, the clock starts on the snap the entire game.
- A loose ball is out of bounds. The clock is restarted when a ball is returned to the field in the NFL. In NFHS and NCAA rules, this is the same as when the ball is carried out of bounds, although under NCAA rules, for the entire game, after a forward fumble out of bounds, the clock starts when the referee gives the ready for play signal. A backwards fumble is treated the same, unless there is less than 2 minutes left in a half, in which case the clock will start on the snap.
- A forward pass is ruled incomplete.
- Either team calls for a timeout.
- An official calls for a timeout, perhaps because a player is injured or there is a penalty on the play. Officials will restart the clock after an official timeout has concluded unless another of the conditions applies. In the NFL, if the timeout is for a penalty enforcement after the 2-minute warning of the first half or inside the last 5 minutes of the second half/overtime (absent special timing rules for specific fouls), the clock starts on the snap.
  - 10 seconds will be taken off the clock, and the clock started when the ball is spotted, if the offense, after the 2-minute warning of either half, fouls or commits certain other acts that cause the clock to stop (including an injury when the offense is out of timeouts, except under certain circumstances), unless the clock will stop anyway for a different reason. In Canadian football, the offense may execute one additional untimed play if the clock expires while the ball is not in play.
- A score or touchback occurs. Additionally, the clock does not run during or after a conversion attempt.
- Possession of the football is transferred between teams for any reason.
- In high school and in the last two minutes of a college half, the clock is briefly stopped when a team earns a first down to allow the chain crew to reposition themselves. The NFL has no such stoppage.

If the clock runs out during a play, the current play is allowed to continue to its conclusion. If the clock runs out between downs, the period ends in American football, but in Canadian football the offense is allowed one last down.

Each team is given three timeouts per half which they can use to stop the clock from running after a play. In the NFL, teams get two timeouts in a regular season overtime period, or three in a postseason overtime half.

On a fair-catch kick in the NFL, the clock starts at the kick and stops at the end of the play.

=== Strategies ===
==== Strategies for leading teams on offense ====
A team on offense that has the higher score seeks to use as much time as possible. A drive may therefore benefit the team, even if it scores no points, by taking time off the clock. The team may:

- Favor run plays over pass plays.
- Use the center of the field rather than the sidelines to avoid going out of bounds and stopping the clock.
- Delay the start of each play until the play clock approaches 0.

The team may use counterintuitive game plans, such as declining to score or allowing the opponents to score, to accelerate the end of the game.

If there is less than 2 minutes,1 minute and 20 seconds, or 40 seconds left on the game clock and the defense does not have at least one, two, or three timeouts respectively, the offense can run out the clock by executing repeated quarterback kneels until the clock runs out. In the NFL and college football, up to 40 seconds can be taken off the clock between plays. The NFL (and, since 2024, college football; 2025, Texas high school football) also has a built-in 2-minute warning that stops the clock after the play that occurs when the clock hits 2 minutes, or a play that, during which, the clock hits or goes under 2 minutes ends. In order to successfully run out the clock by kneeling, there must be less than 40 seconds on the clock if the opponent has two time-outs, 1 minute 20 seconds if the opponent has one time-out, or 2 minutes if the defense has no time-outs remaining, at the snap on a first down (an additional 40 seconds can be run off if the clock keeps running after the play that gains the first down). The offense can burn further time off the clock by timewasting: keeping the ball live (and the clock running) simply by keeping away from any defensive player, regardless of position on the field.

==== Strategies for trailing teams on offense ====
A team on offense that has the lower score seeks to conserve time. The team may:

- Use a no-huddle offense; forgo detailed design of a play and instead signal and initiate a play quickly.
- Have the quarterback "spike" the ball, sacrificing a down to stop the clock. (An explicit exception is written into the American football rule books so that the move is not penalized for intentional grounding nor ruled a fumble, so long as he spikes the ball immediately after the snap from the center.)
- Use a passing play and/or attempt to get the ball carrier near the sidelines so that the ball carrier can go out of bounds before being tackled. (Taking the ball out of bounds and incomplete passes both stop the clock.)
- If a play ends such that the game clock continues running, use a timeout.
- If the ball is still alive while the clock runs out and the team with the ball is still trailing, do everything within the team's power to keep the ball alive until it can be advanced to the end zone. Often this incorporates a series of lateral and backward passes to avoid the ball carrier being tackled and the game ending.

A team that is tied or trailing by one or two points but is within the red zone (and thus in easy field goal range) seeks to burn a specific amount of time off the clock, such that they can stop the clock with five or fewer seconds on the clock, so that their placekicker can kick a field goal with no time remaining and win the game.

One exceptionally rare strategy that a team in possession of the ball near the end of the game can use is the fair catch kick. For the fair catch kick to be a viable option, several conditions must be met: the opposing team must have punted the ball within play and the receiving team used the fair catch to secure the ball, the punt must have been exceptionally short so that the spot of the fair catch is within field goal range and unlikely to be returned, the team using the fair catch kick must be either tied or within three points, and the game must not be played under NCAA rules (the NCAA has no fair catch kick rule).

==== Strategies for the defense ====
A team on defense has little control over the pace of the game. It may expend its timeouts to ensure that there is adequate time left on the clock, in case the team regains possession. The defense can make decisions on how to stop the ball carrier based on whether the team is trailing or leading: if the offense is trying to conserve time, the defense can foil that by tackling the ball carrier in-bounds before they can get out of bounds. Defenses likewise can safely devote more personnel to the perimeter and leave the center of the field and areas near the line of scrimmage less defended, as an offense that cannot afford to keep the clock running will have to throw toward the sidelines (see also: prevent defense).

Various rules ensure that the defense cannot deliberately commit fouls to manipulate the game clock, and in the most extreme such cases, an unfair act can be declared and the game forfeited to the offense. (Likewise, if the offense commits fouls to burn off time and get extra downs, the clock is reset and unsportsmanlike conduct is called on them.)

== Canadian football ==
In Canadian football, a team trailing by one point or tied has an additional option: a ball can be kicked from anywhere on the field in the Canadian code, and a ball kicked into the end zone scores a single point when the receiving team fails to bring it back out or a returner takes a knee. This allows a team trailing by one to advance the ball up field, then punt the ball toward the end zone in hopes of tying the game for one point (the player could also drop kick the ball, which would allow the kicking team to win on a field goal if kicked through the uprights). To prevent this scenario, defending teams will place their punter in the end zone to retrieve the ball and kick it back out of the end zone, preventing the single from being scored. Since the 2026 season, the CFL no longer awards a single when a punt or kickoff passes through the back or sides of the end zone untouched by a returner, or when a missed field goal goes wide of the goalposts, so the kicking team must now keep the ball inside the end zone to score.

Several of the strategies discussed above for American football can be used in the Canadian code; however, rule differences make running out the clock much more difficult:

- Teams are allowed only three downs to advance the ball 10 yards without losing possession (as opposed to four in the American game).
- Since 2026, the offensive team has 35 seconds from the end of the previous play to start a new play for most of the game, but only 20 seconds after the 3-minute warning in each half (as opposed to 40 seconds from the end of the last play throughout college football and NFL games).
- After the three-minute warning in Canadian football, two key timing changes occur:
  - The clock stops after every play. The clock restarts when the referee whistles the ball in play after a tackle in bounds, and with the snap after an incomplete pass or a tackle out of bounds.
  - A "time count" (the same foul as "delay of game" in American football), which is a 5-yard penalty (with the down repeated) at other points in the game, becomes a loss of down penalty on first or second down and a 10-yard penalty on third down. Additionally, if the referee deems a time count violation on third down in the last three minutes of a half to be deliberate, he can require the offensive team to legally place the ball in play within the 20-second count, with a violation resulting in loss of possession.
- If the clock hits 0:00 between plays, Canadian teams are required to execute one final play, even if the ball has not yet been snapped. In the American game, if the clock hits 0:00 between plays, the game is over unless the previous play ended in a defensive penalty, a score, or circumstances warranting a fair catch kick.

These differences make for radically different endgames if the team with the lead has the ball. In the NFL, a team can run 120 seconds (2 minutes), and slightly more in the NCAA, off the clock without gaining a first down (assuming the defensive team is out of timeouts). In the Canadian game, just over 40 seconds can be run off. Since 2026, a CFL half or game can end on a single quarterback kneel when it is first down, the defence has no timeouts remaining, and 40 seconds or fewer remain. The Canadian Football League is proud of this distinction, with "No Lead Is Safe" being one of the league's catchphrases.

In 2026, the CFL replaced its 20-second play clock, which an official started manually, with a 35-second clock starting automatically when the previous play is whistled dead, matching the clock traditionally used in American spring football. Before the season began, the league chose to keep the 20-second clock for the final three minutes of each half.

== See also ==
- Gaming the system
