= Intentional grounding =

Penalty in American football

In gridiron football, intentional grounding is a violation of the rules where "a passer...throws a forward pass without a realistic chance of completion." This typically happens when a quarterback about to be sacked passes the ball toward an area of the field with no eligible receiver. Without this rule, the quarterback could almost always avoid a sack by intentionally throwing an incomplete pass (which would stop the clock and return the ball to the line of scrimmage, avoiding any loss of yardage); instead, the penalty of intentional grounding effectively continues play as if the defense had succeeded in sacking the quarterback.

== History ==
The rule against intentional grounding seems to date from 1914, two seasons after an incomplete pass ceased to result in a turnover, in the period of rule experimentation that followed legalization of the forward pass in 1906.

== Elements ==
A ball carrier, in any location, commits intentional grounding when throwing a pass with no realistic chance of completion in order to avoid a sack; for instance, throwing the football down near himself. In particular, spiking the ball automatically results in a penalty of intentional grounding, regardless of any other factors. However, the rules explicitly allow the quarterback to spike the ball immediately after receiving it from the center to stop the clock (Note: Stopping the clock implies the clock was running. On November 4, 2018, Kansas City Chiefs quarterback Patrick Mahomes mistakenly spiked the ball when the clock was stopped. He was correctly penalized for intentional grounding. See "Ref made the right call on Patrick Mahomes grounding penalty". NBC Sports. 2018-11-04.) without using a time out.

Intentional grounding is called only if all of the following components are present:

- Imminent pressure: The passer must face "imminent loss of yardage." There is no violation when the passer is not about to be tackled but the receiver simply fails to run the route the quarterback expects.
- Location: In the NFL and college, the quarterback must be inside the tackle box (or "pocket"), the area between the two offensive tackles on the line. If the quarterback scrambles to either side and is closer to the sideline than that side's tackle lined up, there is no penalty. The NFL added this element of the rule in 1993 in order to protect quarterbacks; high school football followed suit in 2022. However, intentional grounding can be called on a quarterback (or other offensive ballcarrier) outside the pocket if the pass fails to go beyond the line of scrimmage. In the CFL, the quarterback is not subject to an intentional grounding penalty regardless of his location, so long as the pass reaches the line of scrimmage.
- Target of the pass: The ball must be passed where there is no eligible receiver, such as well out of bounds. If a receiver is nearby but fails to catch the ball, or if a defender deflects the pass, there is no penalty. Conversely, if the pass is caught by an ineligible receiver, intentional grounding may still be called if there is no nearby eligible receiver (although a penalty of illegal touching would also be called, forcing the defense to decide which penalty to accept, if any).

== Penalty ==
The penalty for intentional grounding has several components so that the offense gains no benefit from the violation:

- In the NFL, the offense is penalized 10 yards from the line of scrimmage, except in specific circumstances. (Note: If the foul occurs when the line of scrimmage is inside the offense's own 20-yard line, then the penalty would be assessed half the distance to the goal, rather than the full 10 yards. In such a case, if the spot of the foul is within 10 yards of the line of scrimmage but is greater than half the distance to the goal, then the ball is placed at the spot of the foul, instead. For example, if the line of scrimmage is at the 16-yard line, and the foul occurs at the 7-yard line, it is greater than half the distance (8-yard line) but less than 10 yards (6-yard line) so it is placed at the spot of the foul.) In college football, the ball is placed at the spot of the pass.
- The offense loses the down rather than replaying the down, as is the case for most other penalties.
- If the quarterback threw the pass from his team's own end zone, the penalty results in a safety being scored by the defense.
- Like many offensive penalties, intentional grounding committed near the end of either half results in a ten-second runoff of the game clock, if the defense desires. This ensures that intentional grounding is not an effective means of clock management.

== Pro Bowl ==
In the NFL Pro Bowl, intentional grounding is legal in order to make the game safer.
