= Technical time-out (volleyball) =

A technical time-out in volleyball and beach volleyball is a time-out stipulated by the Fédération Internationale de Volleyball (FIVB) in each non-tie-breaking set. It is the formalized equivalent of a television timeout in other sports:

This special mandatory time out is, in addition to time outs, to allow the promotion of volleyball by analysis of the play and to allow additional commercial opportunities. Technical Time Outs are mandatory for FIVB World and Official competitions.

— FIVB Official Volleyball Rules 2005

== Beach volleyball ==
- 30-second duration
- one technical time-out in each of sets 1 and 2 (none in the third tie-breaking set)
- taken when the combined teams' scores equals 21

== Volleyball ==
- 60-second duration
- two technical time-outs in each of sets 1, 2, 3 and 4 (none in the fifth tie-breaking set)
- taken when the leading team reaches the 8th and 16th points
