= Prevent defense =

Defensive strategy in American football

The prevent defense is a defensive alignment in American football that seeks to prevent the offense from completing a long pass or scoring a touchdown in a single play. It seeks to run out the clock, at the expense of allowing short-yardage gains. It is used by a defense that is winning by more than a touchdown, late in the fourth quarter, or in specific situations, such as third-and-very-long if it seems clear that the offense must pass the football to gain long yardage.

The alignment uses five or more defensive backs (or players in that role), preferring fast players over large players. They back up so far that they concede short-yardage plays, but try to ensure that no receiver is uncovered downfield or can get behind them.

== Implementation ==
The prevent defense concedes short gains, such as four to eight yards per play, as long as the clock keeps running, but aims to prevent plays resulting in longer gains.

Safeties and cornerbacks pull back to a "safe zone" five to ten yards off the line of scrimmage, and the free safety often plays as far away as twenty yards. The defense does not block receivers on the line to slow them down. The prevent defense employs zone defense, in which each defensive back is responsible for an area of the field rather than a specific player. The backs watch the quarterback's eyes in order to determine where he intends to pass the ball.

The sidelines become an important area to defend, when used late in the fourth quarter in order to run out the clock. A player who receives a pass near the sideline can run out of bounds and stop the clock. The defender's priority is less to prevent a reception than to keep the receiver in bounds following one. This keeps the clock running and reduces the amount of time that the offense has in order to try to score.

=== Packages ===
The prevent defense uses five or more defensive backs.

Nickel defense

The nickel defense has five backs, so named because the nickel is the five-cent coin.

Dime defense

The dime defense has six backs, two linebackers, and three down linemen.

Quarter defense

The quarter defense has three down linemen, one linebacker, and seven defensive backs.

Half-dollar defense

The half-dollar defense (also sometimes called the dollar defense) has eight defensive backs, no linebackers and three defensive linemen. The rare package is used when the offense needs to score a touchdown on the very next play, such as with a desperation Hail Mary pass. Nine (dollar) and ten-back defenses are also possible in theory; they are almost never used for practical reasons. Similar scenarios may involve linebackers replacing defensive linemen.

Professional teams may not have enough defensive backs on the roster in order to play the quarter or half-dollar defenses. Wide receivers sometimes fill the extra positions, particularly in late-game situations when the receivers' offensive skills can be put to defensive use.

An offense that can practice clock management effectively can score without executing the long pass that the defense seeks to prevent, when the defense concedes short plays. Some coaches avoid using the prevent defense and choose instead to continue playing the same defensive schemes that seemed to be working well to that point. John Madden once said, "All a prevent defense does is to prevent you from winning."

The prevent defense can make the end of the game uninteresting for fans, by conceding to the offense many easy gains for short yardage without a big play.

The attempt to prevent a long-yardage play can be a victim of individual effort, as happened to the Denver Broncos in the 2012 AFC Divisional Round playoff game. The Baltimore Ravens needed a touchdown to tie the game, and they were facing a third down from their own 30-yard line. Broncos safety Rahim Moore allowed Baltimore receiver Jacoby Jones to get behind him and catch a 70-yard touchdown pass from Joe Flacco, with less than 40 seconds to play. The Ravens went on to win the game in double overtime.
