= Spike (gridiron football) =

Gridiron football tactic

In gridiron football, a spike of the ball is the act of intentionally and forcefully throwing the ball to the ground. Most commonly, this takes the form of a celebration after a score (see below) or a play in which the quarterback intentionally throws a live ball at the ground.

== Description ==
Being an incomplete pass, a spike play stops the clock at the cost of exhausting a down without any gain or loss in yardage. It is principally used when a team is conducting a hurried drive late in a half, and the game clock is running after the previous play. Stopping the clock – particularly when the offense has no timeouts remaining or wishes to conserve timeouts – typically allows the offense more time to plan their next play without losing scarce game clock time.

Running a spike play presumes there will be at least one play by the same team immediately afterward, so it cannot be done on fourth down, as it would result in a turnover. Under NCAA, a minimum of three seconds must be on the clock for a spike play; otherwise, any spike after will result in the rest of the clock being run off. This restriction does not apply in the NFL, where a legally executed spike will stop the clock provided it is performed with at least one second on the clock.

A spike can only be legally performed when the passer is under center, performs the spike immediately after the snap in a single continuous movement, and when the game clock is running. Spiking at any other point while the ball is live is always intentional grounding regardless of pressure or location; this is called a delayed spike.

In Canadian football, spike plays are legal but very rare. This is mainly because the clock always stops after the three minute warning after every play until the ball is spotted by the officials for the next play and also because a final play is always run at the end of each quarter whenever the game clock expires while the ball is dead, rendering spike plays unnecessary. Also, the offense in Canadian football only receives three downs instead of four.

== Failed spikes ==
In the 1998 Rose Bowl, Ryan Leaf spiked the ball and inadvertently ran the clock out on that play. In the 2012 Rose Bowl, Russell Wilson also ran the clock out on a spike play. In both cases, just before such spike, the clock was stopped with just 2 seconds left (while the sideline chains were being moved for 1st down, the usual procedure when playing under college football rules). Wilson's failed spike resulted in the NCAA rule for a three-second minimum for a spike, starting in 2013.

In 2014, Nick Montana spiked the ball on 4th down near the end of the first half of a game between his Tulane University and UCF, resulting in a turnover on downs; he erroneously believed his team had gained a first down. In 2020, Syracuse quarterback Rex Culpepper, against North Carolina State, spiked the ball on fourth down, and with one second left, when the Orange had an opportunity otherwise for one last play.

On November 3, 2018, Kansas City Chiefs quarterback Patrick Mahomes spiked the ball while the clock was stopped with nine seconds left before halftime. He was correctly penalized for intentional grounding, resulting in a ten-second runoff and the referee signaling the end of the half.

On October 17, 2026, Notre Dame quarterback C.J. Carr attempted to spike the ball with the clock stopped at six seconds before half-time. However, Carr lost control of the ball, resulting in a live fumble recovered by BYU and ending the half.

== Spiking after scoring ==
Players also "spike" the football as a touchdown celebration.
