= Running out the clock =

Sports strategy related to clock management

In sports strategy, running out the clock, also known as running down the clock, stonewalling, killing the clock, chewing the clock, milking the clock, stalling, eating clock or time-wasting (or timewasting), is the practice of a winning team allowing the clock to expire through a series of preselected plays, either to preserve a lead or hasten the end of a one-sided contest. Such measures expend time but do not otherwise have a tactical purpose. This is usually done by a team that is winning by a slim margin (or, occasionally, tied) near the end of a game, in order to reduce the time available for the opposing team to score. Generally, it is the opposite strategy of running up the score.

The process of running out the clock generally involves low-risk, low-event play, intending to minimize the ability of the other team to interfere or counter. As this produces unexciting sport for spectators, many rulebooks attempt to counteract this; some include a time limit for completing a play, such as a play clock or shot clock.

Approaches to running out the clock differ, particularly between sports. In some cases it is considered a normal aspect of the game, whereas in others it is considered unsporting. The term "time-wasting" has pejorative implications and is generally reserved for varieties of football. In other timed sports, including basketball, gridiron football, and hockey, the more neutral term "running out the clock" is more commonly used.

== Association football ==
Time-wasting in association football consists of two forms, extending the length of stoppages when the ball is out of play, and, while the ball is in play, playing in a way as to keep possession of the ball as long as possible rather than attempting to score.

Extending the length of stoppages

A common time-wasting tactic is to make substitutions late in the game, lengthening the duration of stoppages while the change is made. Players may also feign injury, kick the ball away, obstruct the taking of a quick free kick by an opposing player, or delay the taking of their own free kicks or throw ins. If the referee considers a delay to be unreasonable, the offending player may be given a yellow card.

When playing at home, there have been some instances where teams have been accused of time-wasting by instructing (or allowing) their ball boys to delay returning the ball to the away team.

These actions should, in theory, be negated by the addition of an equal amount of stoppage time, but teams nevertheless employ these methods.

Maintaining possession

A common tactic often involves carrying the ball into the corner of the field and shielding it from the defender. This will commonly lead to a free kick if the frustrated defender budges the player out of the way, or it can also lead to a throw-in by the defender placing a tackle and managing to legally make contact with the ball so close to the line it often rolls out of play. This can be repeated to continue time-wasting.

Another way to do this is when the keeper catches the ball they will dive to the ground and stay there to waste time.

=== Laws of the Game ===
Both types of time-wasting are generally viewed negatively, though only the former is contrary to the game's rules. Referees are empowered to book players whom they feel are delaying the restart of play and several amendments to the Laws of the Game and guidance to match officials have been made to prevent time-wasting, including progressively stricter restrictions on how long possession can be maintained by goalkeepers. The back-pass rule was introduced in 1992 in order to prevent time-wasting by defenders repeatedly passing the ball back to their goalkeeper.

An amendment to the Laws attempting to mitigate time-wasting substitutions was made in 2019 — players are now required to leave the pitch at the nearest boundary, rather than making an often long and slow walk back to their teams' technical area.

== Australian rules football ==
In a close game, Australian rules football players on the leading side will typically run the clock down by kicking the ball between the defenders while having no intention of a forward thrust, or by advancing the ball with short, low-risk kicks. Each time a mark is taken, the player can run approximately eight seconds off the clock before being required to play on – and may continue to run time off the clock if no opponents pressure them after the call of play on is made. Strategically, running down the clock can be stifled by playing man-on-man defence, in an attempt to force the opposition to kick to a contest, creating the chance for a turnover.

Late in a close game, players who have marked the ball will often attend to their uniforms by performing actions such as tucking in jerseys or pulling their socks up, along with overzealous stretching, in an effort to "milk" the clock and disguise their intentions as an act of plausible deniability. Players kicking for goal are now given a shot clock 30 seconds to take their kicks, while in general play they are only given 7 seconds, after which "play on" is called. According to the laws, wasting time is either (a) a free kick to the opposing team (15.10.1.a), (b) a 50-metre penalty (18.1.b), or (c) a reportable offence if it is judged to be intentional, reckless or negligent (19.2.2.g.iv). In reality, though, the umpire will almost always call play on—even if the time on the 30-second shot clock has been depleted. Shot clocks are disregarded for kicks after the siren.

=== Rushed behinds ===
Defending players can "rush" behinds, scoring a point against their team but maintaining possession. By consuming time in this way they may prevent their opponents from opportunities to score goals worth six points.

These were accepted in general play as being part of the game, however the tactic was exploited to an extreme degree in two high-profile incidents during the 2008 AFL season. In Round 16, Richmond's Joel Bowden rushed two behinds in a row while kicking in to use up time towards the end of their game against Essendon, reducing the margin from 6 points to 4 points but enabling Richmond to win the game. More prominently the 2008 AFL Grand Final saw Hawthorn rush a record 11 behinds against Geelong.

These incidents prompted a rule change and, since 2009, it has been illegal in AFL matches for a defender to deliberately concede a rushed behind when he is not under any pressure from the attacking team. In the event that a defender does this, the umpire awards a free kick to the attacking team on the goal-line at the spot where the defender conceded the score. The defender may still deliberately concede a rushed behind if he is under pressure from an attacker.

== Baseball ==
Baseball does not have a game clock, although some aspects of the game do have time limits, most notably the pitch clock adopted by Major League Baseball (MLB) starting with the 2023 season. Despite the absence of a game clock, stalling tactics have been used in baseball. In games played before the advent of stadium lighting or subject to a relatively early curfew, losing teams sometimes wasted time in the hopes that darkness or curfew would come before the game was declared official—a nine-inning baseball game is not official until five innings are complete (or 4 1/2 innings if the home team is winning). For most of baseball history, games ended before becoming official were replayed from the beginning later, which gave a losing team incentive to waste time under some circumstances. Such deliberate attempts to slow down play are subject to a forfeit being declared. The most recent major-league example occurred on July 18, 1954, when the St. Louis Cardinals were assessed a forfeit after wasting time while losing to the Philadelphia Phillies.

== Basketball ==
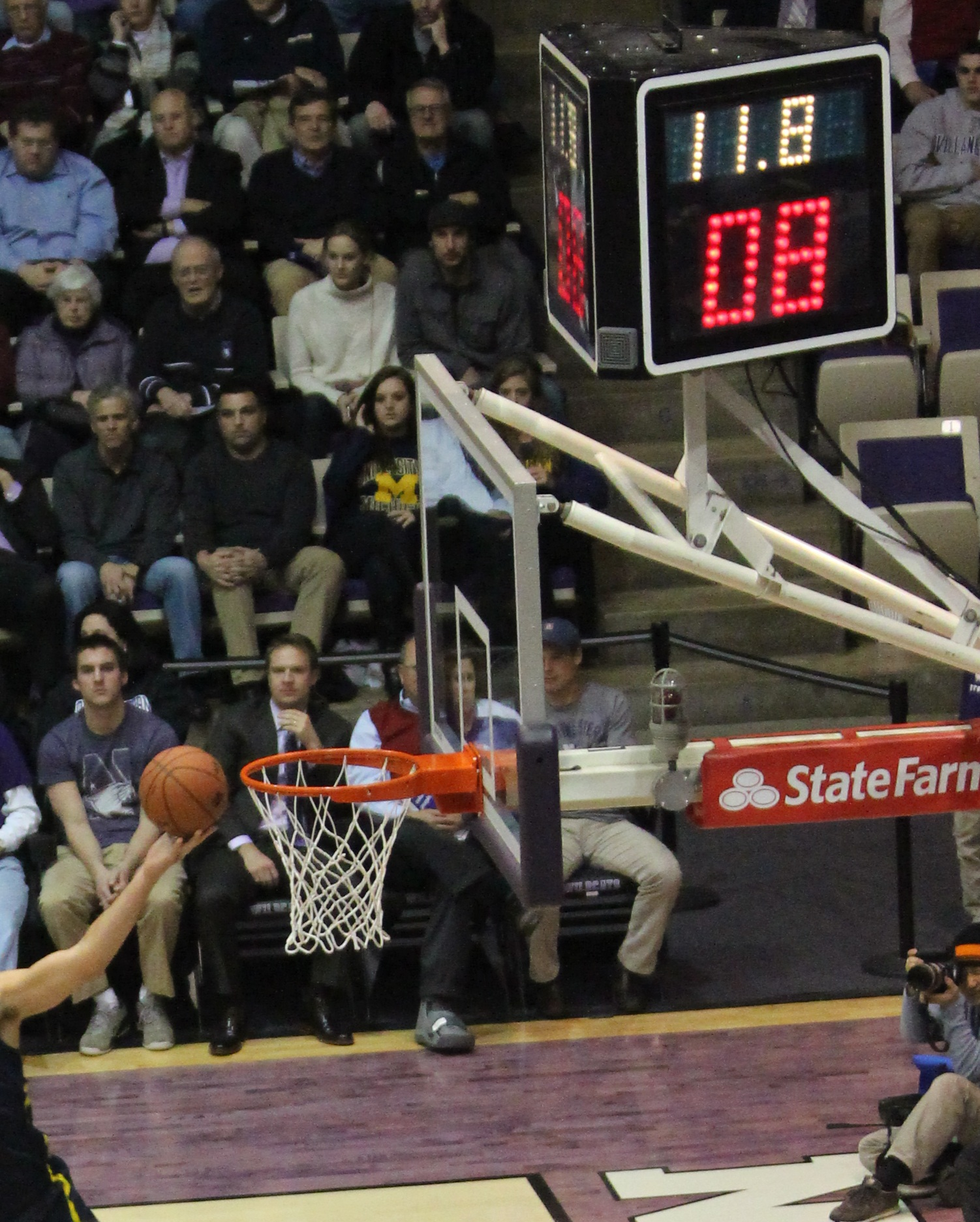
A backboard assembly displaying the shot clock in red (8 seconds) and game clock in white (11.8 seconds)

In basketball games, the clock stops when the ball is dead and runs when it is live.

Running out the clock was a major problem in the early days of the National Basketball Association (NBA). Often, once a team obtained the lead, it spent the remainder of the game just passing the ball back and forth, in what was called stalling, a "delay offense", or more colloquially, "stall ball". The only hope for the defense was to attempt to steal the ball (which could give the offense opportunities to score an easy basket) or commit fouls and hope that the fouled team would miss free throws.

Two notable examples of stalling occurred during the 1950–51 NBA season. The first was a November 1950 game with a final score of 19–18. The second, played in January 1951, had six overtime periods with only a single shot attempted in each. The NBA responded to these problems when Danny Biasone invented the shot clock, which was instituted for the 1954–55 NBA season. The NBA's shot clock gives teams 24 seconds to make a shot that hits the basket rim or scores, with the team losing possession if it fails to do so. This effectively eliminated stalling and, as once noted on the NBA's website, "accomplished nothing less than the salvation of pro basketball."

Today, shot clocks are used in nearly all basketball leagues, although the duration varies (for example, 30 seconds in NCAA college basketball). One notable exception is high school basketball in the United States; as of 2017, only eight U.S. states used a high school shot clock. The use of a shot clock in high school basketball can vary by state or league, and stalling tactics (such as the four corners offense) may be used as an offensive strategy if circumstances call for it, though some state athletic associations or game referees can prohibit it as an unsportsmanlike act.

Most clock management in modern basketball centers around both the game clock and the shot clock. An offense nearing the end of a game and holding a slim lead will attempt to use as much of both clocks as possible before shooting the ball, to give the opposing team as little time as possible to respond. A team trailing by a small margin near the end of regulation or overtime may counter this by intentionally committing personal fouls on defense. This stops the clock, and if the fouling team is in the penalty situation, forces the fouled team to shoot free throws (usually two). If the last free throw is successful or if the fouling teams rebounds a missed last free throw, the fouling team will regain possession without any additional clock time lost, but this strategy risks giving the fouled team an opportunity to extend its lead if it makes the free throw(s). Fouls intentionally committed in this way are usually tolerated with no penalty beyond the normal penalties assessed for personal fouls, as long as the fouls are not flagrant. Alternate basketball rules, such as the Elam Ending, have been proposed to minimize intentional fouling at the end of games.

== Gridiron football ==
=== American football ===
In American football, each quarter of a game is measured with a 15-minute game clock, or 12-minute clock in many high school football codes and the German Football League. A team with the lead and the ball will attempt to use as much of the game clock as possible to end the game more quickly, thus denying the opposition another chance on offense.

Typically, the leading team will execute a series of simple rushing plays (the clock does not stop moving at the conclusion of a rushing play unless the rusher steps out of bounds) or one or more quarterback kneels. A team will often accept minimal prospect for a large gain in yardage (or even, particularly with quarterback kneels, a modest loss of yardage) to drain more time from the game clock, as time elapsed is considered more valuable than yardage to a team with the lead. A team running out the clock typically will not use passing plays because an incomplete pass will stop the game clock. Passing plays always carry the risk of interception, and spread the offense widely across the field, which makes tackling after an interception much harder compared to a fumble. If the ball passes out of bounds, the clock will also stop. This leads to teams running plays in the middle of the field to minimize the chance that the ball will travel out of bounds. Running plays also carry a much lower chance of turning the ball over and of a turnover resulting in a score or significant gain for the defense. Relatively safe, short, West Coast offense-type passes can be, and sometimes are, included in attempts to run out the clock, especially if more yardage is needed to earn a first down and maintain possession.

In both professional and college football, the offense has 40 seconds from the end of the previous play to run the next play. A team running out the clock will allow the play clock (which records the time remaining until a play must be run) to decrease as much as possible before running its next play. In the NFL, this is particularly noteworthy due to the existence of the two-minute warning. If the trailing team has no timeouts remaining and the leading team is in possession of the ball with a first down at the two-minute warning, they can effectively run out the clock and win the game without running another positive play. With two minutes to go (120 seconds), the offense can take three "knees", one each on 1st, 2nd, and 3rd down (using all 40 seconds from the play clock on each), and allow the game clock to expire before having to run a play for fourth down. A similar situation can be had by also achieving a first down inside the two-minute warning. This practice is commonly known as the "Victory Formation", as the offense lines up in a tightly protective "V" formation to minimize the chances of a fumble or other turnover.

Conversely, a team that faces the risk of the other team running out the clock may attempt to force its opponent to score so it can quickly get the ball back. In Super Bowl XLVI, for example, the New England Patriots were ahead of the New York Giants 17–15 with 1:04 left in the fourth quarter. The Giants were at the Patriots' six-yard line; however, the Patriots had only one time-out left. The Giants elected to run out as much time as possible and then kick a relatively short field goal to take a late lead. Had the Giants been successful in this strategy it would have left the Patriots with no timeouts and less than 10 seconds remaining to score. The Patriots thus let Ahmad Bradshaw score a touchdown in hopes of scoring a touchdown of their own before the game's end. Bradshaw, aware of the Patriots' strategy, attempted to stop himself from crossing the goal line but was unsuccessful as his momentum carried him forward. The Patriots then received the ball with 57 seconds remaining, but failed to score, and the Giants won 21–17.

Alternatively in Week 7 of the 2020 NFL season, a similar situation occurred where the Atlanta Falcons were trailing the Detroit Lions, who had no more timeouts, 14–16 with 1:12 left in the game and were at the Detroit ten-yard line. Atlanta quarterback Matt Ryan was planning to hand the ball off to running back Todd Gurley so Gurley could fall down in bounds short of the goal line in order for the Falcons to run out the clock and kick a game-winning field goal as time expired, with Ryan literally telling Gurley "don't score" in the huddle. However, on the next play, Gurley rushed up the middle for ten yards and tried to go down at the one yard line, but with no Detroit defenders even trying to stop him short, accidentally broke the plane of the goal line, giving the Falcons an unintentional touchdown with 1:04 left in the game. The Falcons opted for a two-point conversion, which was successful with a pass to wide receiver Calvin Ridley, putting them ahead 22–16, but with over a minute left on the clock for the Lions to try to win the game. Quarterback Matthew Stafford then led Detroit on a 75-yard drive in 8 plays all the way down the field, culminating with an 11-yard pass to tight end T. J. Hockenson to tie the game as time expired, and kicker Matt Prater kicking the game-winning extra point to give the Lions a narrow 23–22 win.

A team that has recently scored and taken the lead with a short amount of time left will usually attempt a squib kick on the ensuing kickoff; the low, bouncing squib kick cannot be fair caught and lands short of a touchback, effectively requiring the return team to play the ball and run time off the clock. The Buffalo Bills' refusal to kick a squib kick following a touchdown in a 2022 playoff game left 13 seconds on the clock, enough time for the Kansas City Chiefs to tie the game and eventually win in overtime.

=== Canadian football ===
Rule differences between the two codes mean that in Canadian football running out the clock is much more limited. The specific differences are:

- The offensive team is only allowed three downs to advance the ball 10 yards and thereby maintain possession, as opposed to four downs in the American game.
- The play clock runs for only 20 seconds from the time the ball is whistled into play, compared to 40 seconds from the end of the last play in U.S. college football and the NFL.
- Two major changes in game timing occur in the last 3 minutes of each half:
  - The clock stops after each play.
  - The penalty for "time count violation" (equivalent to "delay of game" in American football) is loss of down on first or second down, and 10 yards on third down with the down repeated. The referee has the right to penalize repeated third-down time counts during the last 3 minutes with loss of possession.
- Finally, if the game clock runs out while the ball is dead, the quarter is extended by one final untimed play.

A Canadian football side on offense with a full set of downs can run just over 40 seconds off the game clock, a third of what is possible in American football. The Canadian Football League is proud of this distinction, with "no lead is safe" being one of the league's catchphrases.

== Ice hockey ==
An ice hockey team which shoots the puck forward from their half of the ice over the opposing team's goal line in an effort to stonewall is guilty of icing, and the puck is brought to the other end of the ice for a face-off. The rule is not in effect when a team is playing shorthanded due to a penalty. Additionally, a player (usually a goalkeeper) may be charged with a minor (two-minute) penalty for delay of game for shooting the puck over the glass and out of play. A leading team may pass the puck to the defense who will then retreat in his zone. During a power play, the shorthanded team will try to ice the puck in order to gain time until the penalty time ends.

== Lacrosse ==
In lacrosse, once a team gains possession in its own end, it must advance the ball from its defensive square to the midfield line within 20 seconds (a time period that runs whether they possess the ball or it becomes loose, ending only if the other team regains possession, play is stopped for any other reason or an official calls a play-on after seeing a technical foul that does not immediately disadvantage the fouled team) and then into the offensive square within 10 additional seconds (although the loose ball only need touch the ground within the box to satisfy that requirement) or lose possession; additionally, a team in possession that appears to be stonewalling by not attacking the goal may be ordered by the referee to stay within the attacking box or lose possession. The NCAA, Premier Lacrosse League and most forms of indoor lacrosse also employ a shot clock as with basketball.

== Rugby league ==
In the National Rugby League (rugby league), anti-time wasting measures include countdown clocks to achieve timely formations of the scrum and execution of line drop-outs, calling of time-off during the last five minutes of the match when a try has been scored, or when a conversion attempt runs longer than 80 seconds.

== Rugby union ==
In rugby union, it often takes place by one team deliberately collapsing a scrum. The penalty is a free kick, as it is considered a technical offence.

== Water polo ==
A 30-second shot clock is employed in water polo, in much the same manner as college basketball.

== See also ==
- Garbage time
- Delay of game
- Mercy rule
- Time-out (sport)
