= Play clock =

Countdown clock in gridiron football

A play clock, also called a delay-of-game timer, is a countdown clock intended to speed up the pace of the game in gridiron football (American or Canadian). The offensive team must put the ball in play by either snapping the ball during a scrimmage down or kicking the ball during a free kick down before the time expires, or else they will be assessed a 5-yard delay of game (American football) or time count violation (Canadian football; that code's "delay of game" is a different infraction) penalty. If a visible clock is not available or not functioning, game officials on the field use a stopwatch or other similar device to enforce the rule.

In many football games, the play clock is managed by the back judge who is positioned behind the defense and faces the quarterback. When the play clock counts down to 5 seconds remaining, some back judges raise their arm over their head to warn the quarterback, and rotate their arm downward, counting down the final seconds. A penalty flag for delay is thrown afterward.

In the strategy of clock management, a team can slow the pace of a game by taking the maximum amount of time allotted between plays. A team wishing to do so would wait to snap the ball until one second is left on the play clock, or take a timeout. In the latter situation, which usually occurs in the closing minute of the second or fourth quarters before a field goal attempt, the referee will often stand close to the possessing team's sideline, quarterback, or coach to accurately note the maximum time before delay is called was run off, and whistle the clock dead when the timeout gesture is made.

== United States ==
In the NFL, teams have 40 seconds from the end of the previous down. A 25-second play clock is used following a:

- change of possession,
- timeout (including team, administrative/injury, and media timeouts),
- two-minute warning,
- penalty committed by the offense,
- end of a quarter,
- kickoff,
- conversion (a.k.a. "PAT"),
- or after an instant replay review.

Before 2008, in college football, the play clock was 25 seconds beginning when the ball was spotted, but the clock was not stopped to spot the ball unless the previous play resulted in a stoppage of the clock. Now, the same intervals as the NFL are used, with minor differences for the final two minutes of each half. In high school football, starting with the 2019 season, teams use the 40-second play clock as in the NCAA and NFL, with minor exceptions. Various professional leagues use their own standards; the original XFL and Alliance of American Football, for instance, used a 35-second play clock to encourage faster play; the revived XFL uses a play clock measured 25 seconds from the spotting of the ball. Arena football used a 35-second play clock.

== Canada ==
In most levels of Canadian football, the offensive team must run a play within 20 seconds of the referee whistling the play in. The Canadian Football League moved to a 35-second play clock in the 2026 season which starts automatically at the end of the previous play, except after the three-minute warning in each half; as the game clock stops after each play once this time is reached, the play clock reverts to the old rule of 20 seconds starting on the referee's signal. A time count in the CFL is enforced differently at certain points of the game. If the time count occurs before the three-minute mark of a half, the penalty is five yards and the down is repeated. In the final three minutes, the penalty is a loss of down on first or second down or 10 yards, with the down repeated, on third down. If the referee deems a time count committed on third down in the last three minutes of a half to be deliberate, he can require the offensive team to put the ball in play within 20 seconds or else forfeit possession. Time counts during convert attempts, during which the ball is live but the clock does not run, are 5-yard penalties with the down repeated at all times in the game.

== See also ==
- Pitch clock – Clock used in baseball to speed play
- Shot clock – Clock used for pace of play in sports
