= Delay of game =

Time-based penalty in sports

Delay of game is an action in a sports game in which a player or team deliberately stalls the game, usually with the intention of using the delay to its advantage. In some sports, the delay of game is considered an infraction if it is longer than that permitted according to the game's rules, in which case a penalty can be issued. Some sports that have a delay of game penalty are American football, Canadian football, ice hockey and association football.

== Gridiron football ==
=== American ===
In American football, an offensive team is penalized five yards for delay of game if it fails to put the ball in play by either snap or free kick before the play clock expires. This time limit varies by league, and is often 25 seconds from the time the referee signals the ball ready for play. In the National Football League, it can also be 40 seconds from the end of the previous down, depending on the circumstances at the time. Also, the defensive team can be given the same penalty if, after a play has ended, they fail to quickly yield the ball to officials, prevent a player on the offense from getting up, or kick the ball. Sometimes the penalty is committed intentionally on fourth down in order to give the punter a more advantageous punting distance to decrease the odds of a touchback.

=== Canadian ===
In Canadian football, the term "delay of game" is used for a different type of foul. On kickoffs, it can be called against the kicking team for failure to put the ball in play within 20 seconds of the referee's signal. At other times in the game, it can be called against the defensive team for interference with the placement of the ball after it is declared in play by the referee. In both cases, the penalty is 10 yards from the previous spot.

The foul known as "delay of game" in American football is called "time count" in Canada. It is generally identical to the American foul, with two important exceptions. First, Canadian football only allows the offensive team 20 seconds from the referee's signal to put the ball in play, as opposed to the longer periods allowed in the American code. Second, the penalty, which is identical to that in the American code during most of the game, including convert attempts at any time, is dramatically different after the Canadian code's three-minute warning near the end of each half. After the three-minute warning, the base penalty becomes loss of down on first or second down, instead of the regular 5 yards. On third down (the final down that the offensive side has to gain a first down), the penalty becomes 10 yards with the down repeated. The referee also has the right to give possession to the defensive team if he deems repeated time count violations on third down to be deliberate.

== Association football ==
Any player who the referee adjuges to be delaying the restart of the game to gain an unfair advantage is cautioned and may be shown a yellow card. Common strategies include delaying the taking of a goal kick or free kick, "diving", a term used for players pretending to be injured, or taking excessive time to leave or enter the field of play during a substitution.

== Ice hockey ==
A player who shoots the puck directly (that is, without a deflection off the glass or another player or stick) over the glass and out of play from his defensive zone or in the neutral zone, whether intentional or not, is charged with a minor penalty (two minutes).

A player who intentionally removes his own goal from its moorings is charged with a minor penalty (two minutes).

Also, in leagues utilizing the trapezoid behind the net, if the goaltender plays the puck in the outside corners of the area, he is charged with a delay of game.

== Bowling ==
In the Professional Bowlers Association tour events, a 25-second shot clock is used for televised events. The clock starts when the bowler picks up his ball on the first ball of a frame, or when it exits the automatic ball return on all other balls. If the bowler fails to release the ball before the clock expires, he is warned on the first offense and charged with a minor penalty ($50 fine) on subsequent offenses in the same tournament.

== Baseball ==
MLB rule 8.04 requires that, "when the bases are unoccupied, the pitcher shall deliver the ball to the batter within 12 seconds after he receives the ball. Each time the pitcher delays the game by violating this rule, the umpire shall call "Ball". The 12-second timing starts when the pitcher is in possession of the ball and the batter is in the box, alert to the pitcher. The timing stops when the pitcher releases the ball."

In 2010, the Southeastern Conference began enforcing a 20-second pitch clock when the bases are empty, and the rule was adopted by the NCAA in 2011. A warning is given for the first violation, and subsequent violations by a pitcher result in an automatic ball. If the batter causes the 20-second violation, an automatic strike is assessed. The clock will be visible. The pitch clock was used in the Double-A and Triple-A levels of Minor League Baseball beginning in the 2015 season.

== Basketball ==
"Delay of game" is a violation in basketball. FIBA, NBA and U.S. NCAA have provisions on delays of game, with the first violation being a warning, and the succeeding violations are assessed as technical fouls. FIBA's rules on delaying the game are for deliberately touching the ball after it passes through the basket or by preventing a throw-in from being taken promptly. The NBA's delay of game violations include preventing the ball from being promptly put into play during throw-ins, including a player touching the ball or a defender crossing the boundary line prior to the throw-in, players or other non-players interfering with the ball when it crosses the boundary line, and entering the court with an untucked shirt. The NCAA's rules include provisions on teams that fail to be ready at the start of every quarter or at the end of time outs.

Aside from a technical foul, the shot clock is reset to 14 seconds or remains the same, whichever is greater, if the defensive team is the violator; if the offensive team is assessed with the violation, no change in timing will be given. In the NBA, if the delay of game occurred in the last two minutes of the fourth quarter or overtime, a technical foul will be assessed if a player crosses the boundary line prior to a throw-in, even if their team has not previously been charged with a warning.

No ejection of a player or coach can result from a delay of game violation.

In the PBA, the first violation for a delay of game would result in a warning regardless if it happens during the last 2 minutes of the game. The violation is commonly used during throw-ins of close games in order to "peek" at the play or rotation the opposing team is planning to execute.

== Cricket ==
In limited overs cricket, teams are fined if they do not deliver a certain number of legal balls within a given time span. In addition, the umpires can give 5 penalty runs to either team if they think the other team is wasting time.

== Quiz bowl ==
In quiz bowl, players buzzing in on a tossup question must say their answer within a short time, usually five seconds. Taking longer than five seconds is called stalling, and typically is treated as if the player gave the wrong answer. This usually implies that the team will be negged (five points taken from the score in NAQT format) and the other team has the opportunity to answer the question while the stalling team is locked out.

== See also ==
- Play clock
- Shot clock
- Stalling (gaming)
