= Time-out (sport) =

Intentional delay in sports

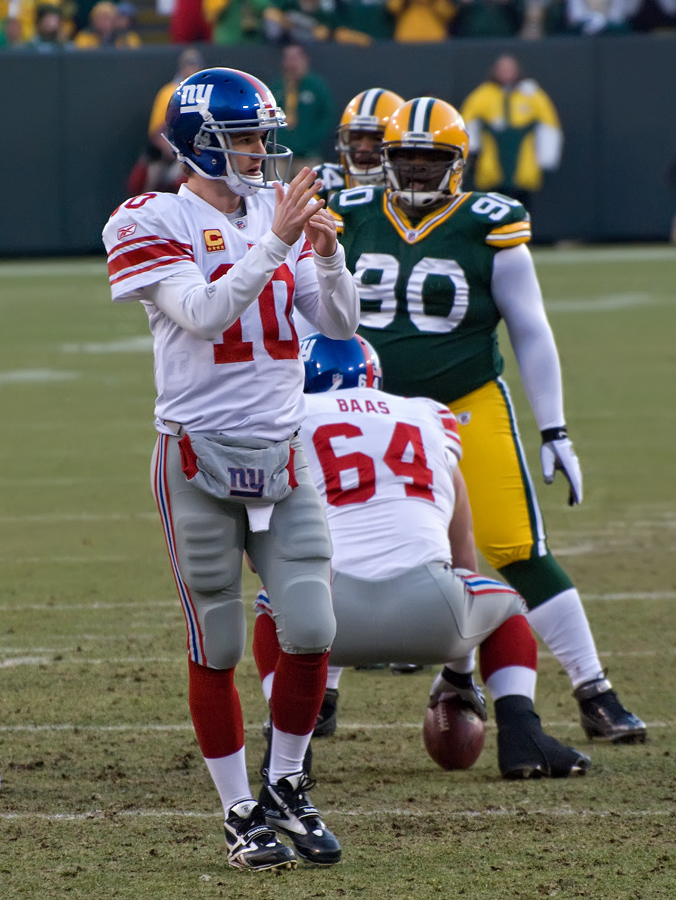
New York Giants quarterback Eli Manning calls for a time-out during a 2011 National Football League game.

In sports, a time-out (or timeout) is a halt in the play. This allows the coaches of either team to communicate with the team, e.g., to determine strategy or inspire morale, as well as to stop the game clock. Time-outs are usually called by coaches or players, although for some sports, TV timeouts are called to allow media to air commercial breaks. Teams usually call timeouts at strategically important points in the match, or to avoid the team being called for a delay of game-type violation, such as the five-second rule in basketball.

== List of time-out rules by sport ==
=== Association football ===
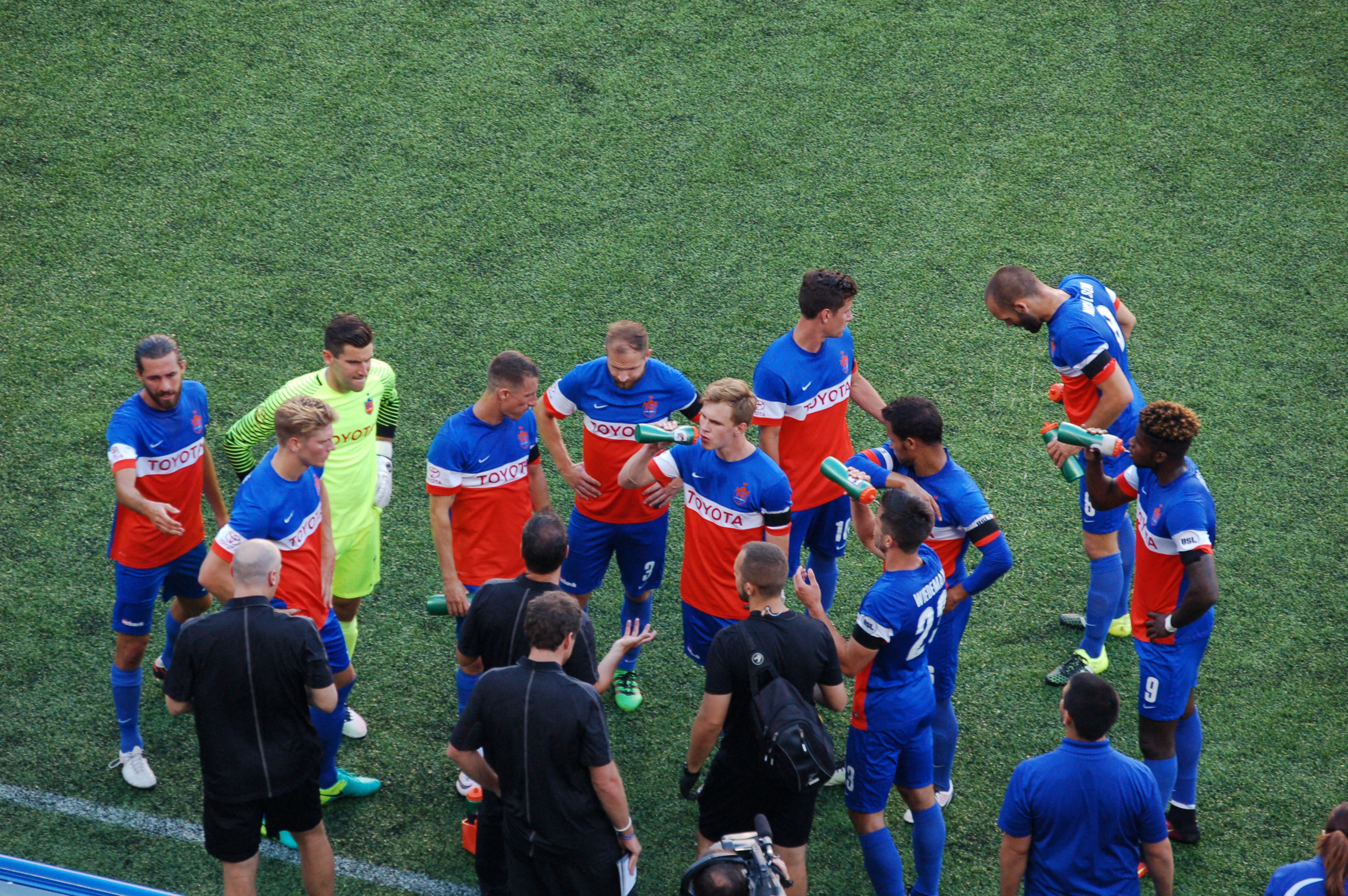
FC Cincinnati hydration break

Until the 2026 FIFA World Cup introduced hydration breaks, timeouts have never been permitted in association football, with very few exceptions such as in the defunct North American Soccer League.

Moreover, the game clock runs continuously in each half, even if extenuating circumstances compel the referee to halt play for an extended period of time, unless the match is abandoned. However, the referee adds stoppage time at the end of each half to ensure 45 minutes of actual play is completed in each half after accounting for the amount of time play is interrupted.

=== Baseball ===
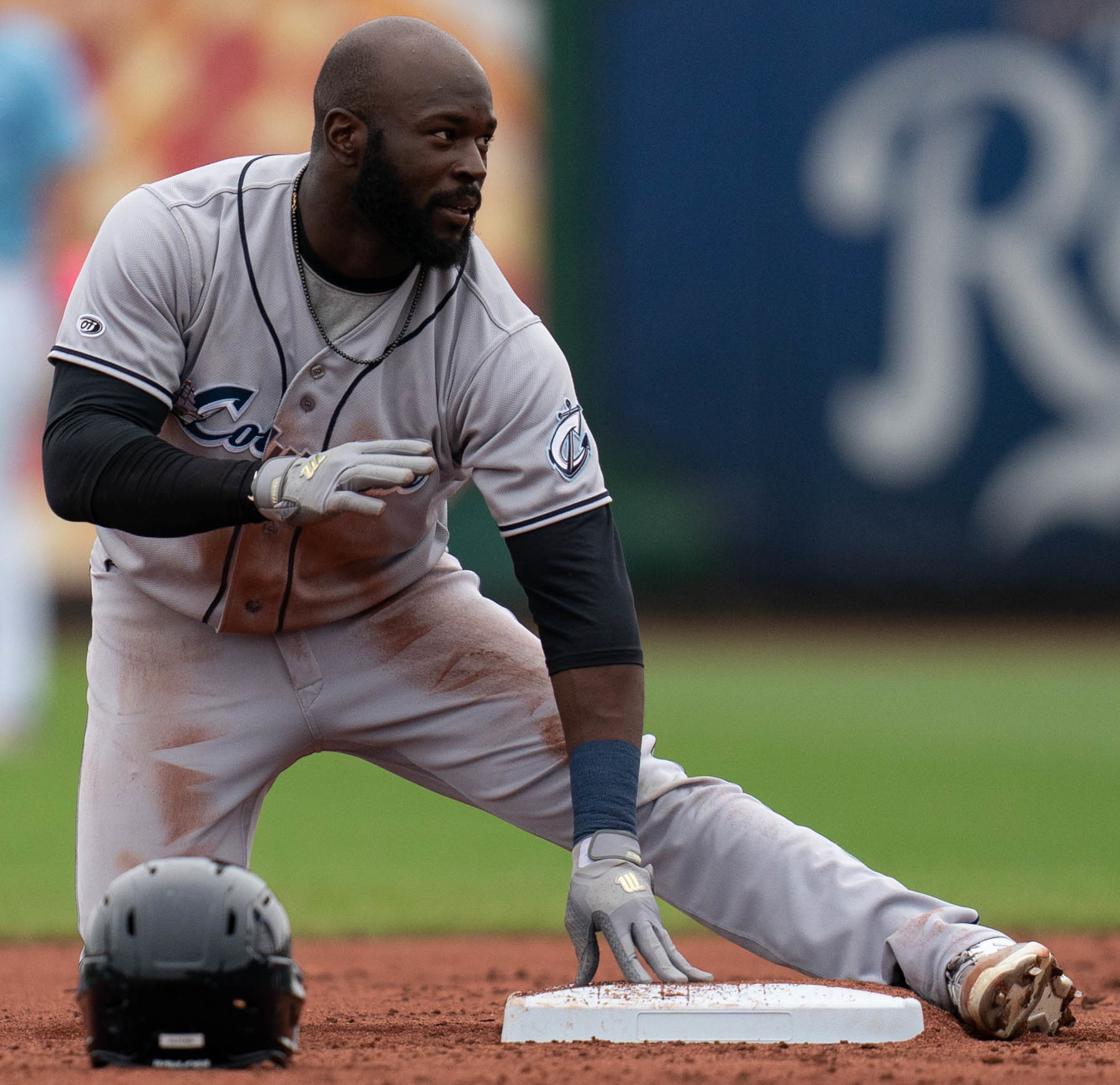
Having lost his batting helmet, Anthony Alford requests time after reaching base safely during a 2022 Minor League Baseball game.

Baseball players and managers of both the offense and defense can request time out for a number of purposes, such as for a batter to step out of the batter's box to better prepare for a pitch, a foreign object entering a batter's eye such as dust or a bug, for a manager to speak with a player or umpire, or to replace one player with another (for which a time-out is required by the rules), etc. The requested time out is not effective unless an umpire grants it verbally or by hand signal (both hands raised). The umpire also has the ability to call time out for his/her own purposes, or for purposes of the game, such as replacing a worn ball. Since there is no clock in baseball, the main effect of a time out is to temporarily prevent the defensive team from tagging base runners out or delivering a pitch as well as to prevent base runners from advancing. However, the catcher may also request timeout once the pitcher has stepped on the rubber, usually with the intention of either "resetting" the play, or to deliver some information to the pitcher via either signals or a visit to the mound. Under certain (uncommon) circumstances specified by the rules, umpires are required to call time out, even while a play is in progress, such as certain cases of interference. Unlike many other sports, the rules of baseball do not limit time outs, either by number or duration. The end of the time out is indicated by an umpire verbally declaring "Play!" and/or by pointing at the pitcher while he is holding the ball (these umpire signals are identical to those used to start a game or resume play after the ball has become "dead", for example due to a half-inning ending). Since baseball provides natural breaks in the action when teams exchange offensive and defensive roles between half-innings (two minutes, five seconds normally; two minutes and twenty-five seconds for nationally televised games), TV timeouts are not necessary.

Other than coaching visits, which the umpires ensure stay brief, timeouts theoretically have no time limits. However, when no runners occupy a base, a pitcher must deliver the pitch within twelve seconds of receiving the ball from the catcher or else a "delay of game" is called, resulting in a ball. Also, any relief pitcher is limited to eight warm-up throws before play resumes, except in special circumstances (such as a pitcher substitution due to injury).

Though not officially recognized as a "timeout", a stoppage in play can also be requested by the defense. This can be accomplished in several ways. First, once in his "set" position, the pitcher may stop play by stepping off the rubber prior to his windup. Secondly, the catcher may visit the pitcher at any point before he steps on the rubber. Finally, the manager or pitching coach may also visit the pitcher before he steps on the rubber (called a "coaching visit"). Under Major League Baseball (MLB) rules, a team is limited to one visit per inning and a maximum of three per game. Under NFHS (U.S. high school) rules, a team receives three mound visits for the game and can use more than one an inning. If a team exceeds the limit in either MLB or high school ball, the pitcher must be removed immediately.

=== Basketball ===
==== NCAA ====
The National Collegiate Athletic Association (NCAA) uses four systems of timeouts. Regardless of the specific system, either players or coaches can call timeouts.

In men's games that are not broadcast, each team is allowed four 75-second and two 30-second timeouts per regulation game.

In women's games that are not broadcast, each team is allowed two 60-second and three 30-second timeouts per regulation game. Each team receives one extra 30-second timeout per overtime period.

In men's games which are being broadcast, as of the 2015-16 season, each team is granted one 60-second timeout and three 30-second timeouts per game in addition to the media timeouts (at the first dead ball under 16, 12, 8 and 4 minutes remaining in each half). A maximum of two 30-second timeouts may carry over into the second half. Any called timeout that occurs within the 30 seconds prior to a scheduled media timeout break automatically takes the place of the upcoming media timeout, with the only exception to this rule being the first called timeout of the second half. A timeout cannot be called by a coach when the ball is live. Previously, under NCAA rules in prior seasons, teams had a total of five timeouts, and timeouts superseding media timeouts were only used in the women's rules.

With the NCAA women's game being played in quarters instead of halves, a separate system is used in women's broadcast games. Each team receives one 60-second and three 30-second timeouts per game, in addition to media timeouts at the first dead ball on or after the 5-minute mark of each quarter. The first called timeout of each quarter, if taken before the 5-minute mark, replaces that quarter's media timeout. Unlike the men's game, all unused 30-second timeouts carry over to all subsequent periods. As in non-broadcast games, each team receives an extra 30-second timeout per overtime period.

==== NFHS ====
High school basketball allots five timeouts per game, with three 60-second and two 30-second timeouts. In overtime games, each team is given one additional 60-second timeout in each overtime period, and is allowed to carry over any unused timeouts from regulation or – if the case may be – previous overtimes. Media timeouts are typically reserved for televised state tournament games only.

Coaches and players can call timeouts. While the ball is live, only the team in control of the ball can request a timeout.

==== NBA ====
In the National Basketball Association (NBA), teams are allowed seven timeouts, each of 1 minute, 15 seconds. There is no limit on substitutions. In overtime periods, each team is allowed two timeouts. A timeout can only be requested by a player in the game or the head coach, and only when the ball is dead or in control of the team making the request. If a request for a timeout is made with none remaining, the offending team is assessed a technical foul and loses possession if the referees approve that request. If not, no penalty is assessed.

In each quarter, there are two mandatory timeouts. If no team has taken a timeout prior to 6:59 of the period, then the next time the ball is dead, the official scorer calls a timeout and charges it to the home team. If no subsequent timeouts have been taken prior to 2:59 of the period, the official scorer declares it and charges it to the team not previously charged. The first and second timeouts in a quarter are extended to 2:45 for locally televised games and 3:15 for nationally televised games, to accommodate advertising.

A team is limited to a maximum of four timeouts in the fourth quarter, losing any timeouts not yet taken. With three minutes remaining in the fourth quarter, a team is limited to two timeouts. However, if one team has yet to be charged its mandatory timeout, then the limit applies after the mandatory timeout is taken.

With less than two minutes to go in the game or overtime period, if the offensive team takes a timeout prior to inbounding the ball or if it secures the ball from a rebound or turnover but prior to advancing it, the team may choose to inbound the ball at midcourt.

The rules were changed before the 2017-18 NBA season to eliminate the distinction between "full" and "20-second" timeouts (which were actually 60 seconds by rule) and eliminate a third mandatory timeout in the second and fourth quarters. The changes sped up the pace of play and addressed a common fan complaint that the last few minutes of a game dragged due to excessive timeouts. However, some coaches call several timeouts before the three-minute mark to avoid losing them.

==== FIBA ====
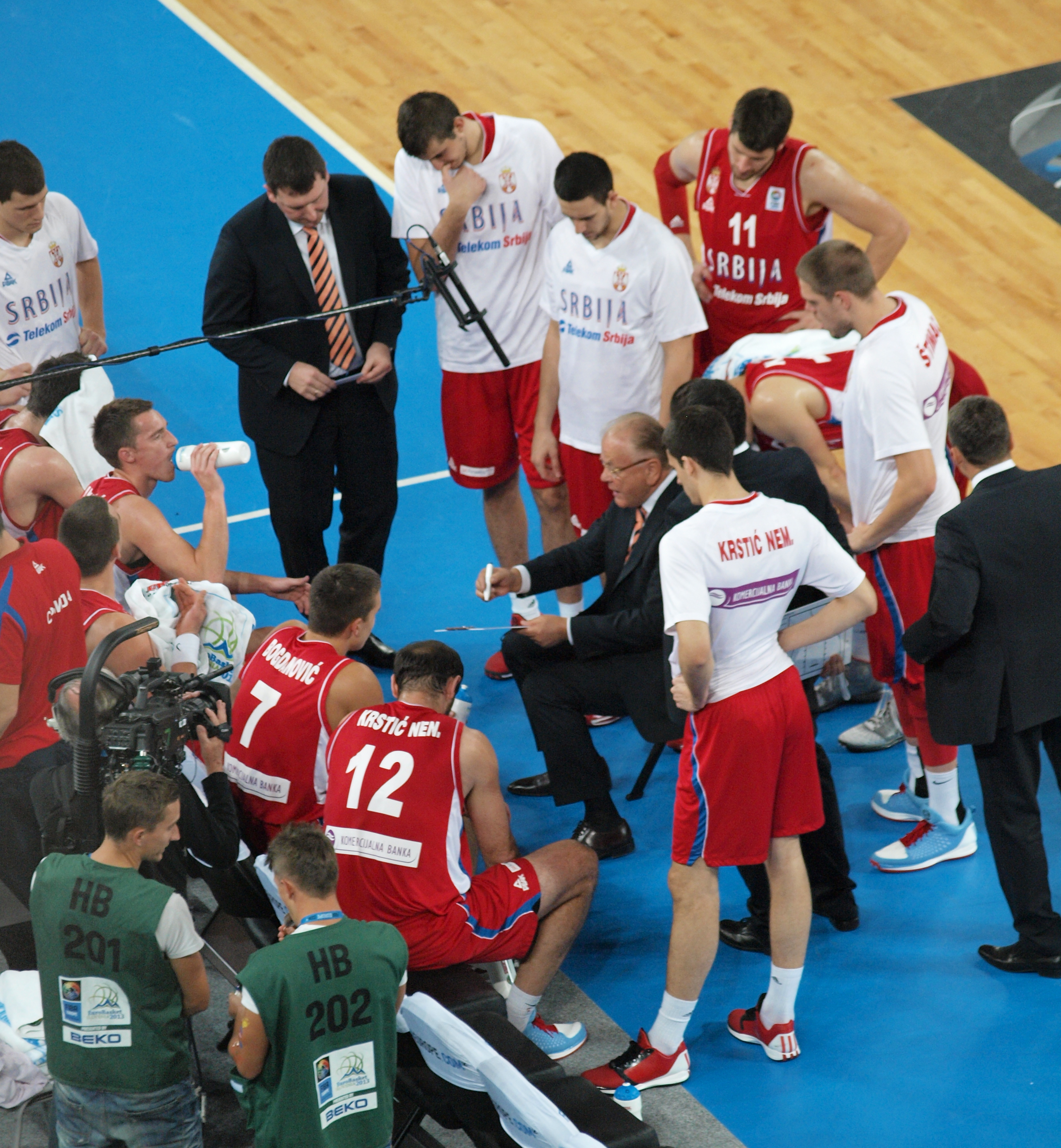
The Serbia men's national basketball team huddles to discuss strategy during a time-out at EuroBasket 2013

Under FIBA rules, each team is allowed two time-outs in the first half, three time-outs in the second half, and one time-out in each overtime period. Only two time-outs may be granted to each team during the last two minutes of the fourth quarter.

Unlike in most other rule sets, only coaches are allowed to call time-outs. A time-out request may be made to the scorer's table at any time, but it may only be granted by a referee when the ball is dead and the game clock is not running. A time-out may also be granted after a scored goal, but only to the team that was scored upon. If a time-out is granted to the team in possession of the ball during the last two minutes of the fourth quarter or any overtime, the head coach of the team calling the time-out may choose to have the game resumed with a throw-in either from a designated line in the team's frontcourt or from the place in the backcourt nearest to where the game was stopped.

In televised games, media time-outs may be used at the discretion of the game's organizing body. They may be up to 100 seconds long. One of these time-outs will occur in each quarter, but no media time-outs are allowed during overtime. If a time-out is requested by either team during the first five minutes of a quarter, this time-out will be considered a media time-out and will also be charged to the appropriate team. If neither team has requested a time-out by the first dead ball after the five-minute mark in a quarter, a media time-out shall be taken. This time-out is not charged to either team.

=== Cricket ===
During the 2009 season of the Indian Premier League of T20 cricket, the halfway point of each innings contained a seven-and-a-half minute television timeout, two-thirds of which were devoted to additional advertising time.

After complaints by viewers and players, criticizing its commercial purpose and for breaking the flow of the game, the following season saw them replaced them with two sponsored and compulsory two-and-a-half minute "strategic timeouts" that must be taken by each side at certain points during the innings: one must be taken by the bowling team between the 6th to 10th overs, and the batting team between the 13th to 16th overs.

=== Floorball ===
In floorball, each team is allowed one thirty-second time-out per game, which may only be taken during a normal stoppage of play. The time-out is measured from when all the players are gathered around the team benches.

=== Gridiron football ===
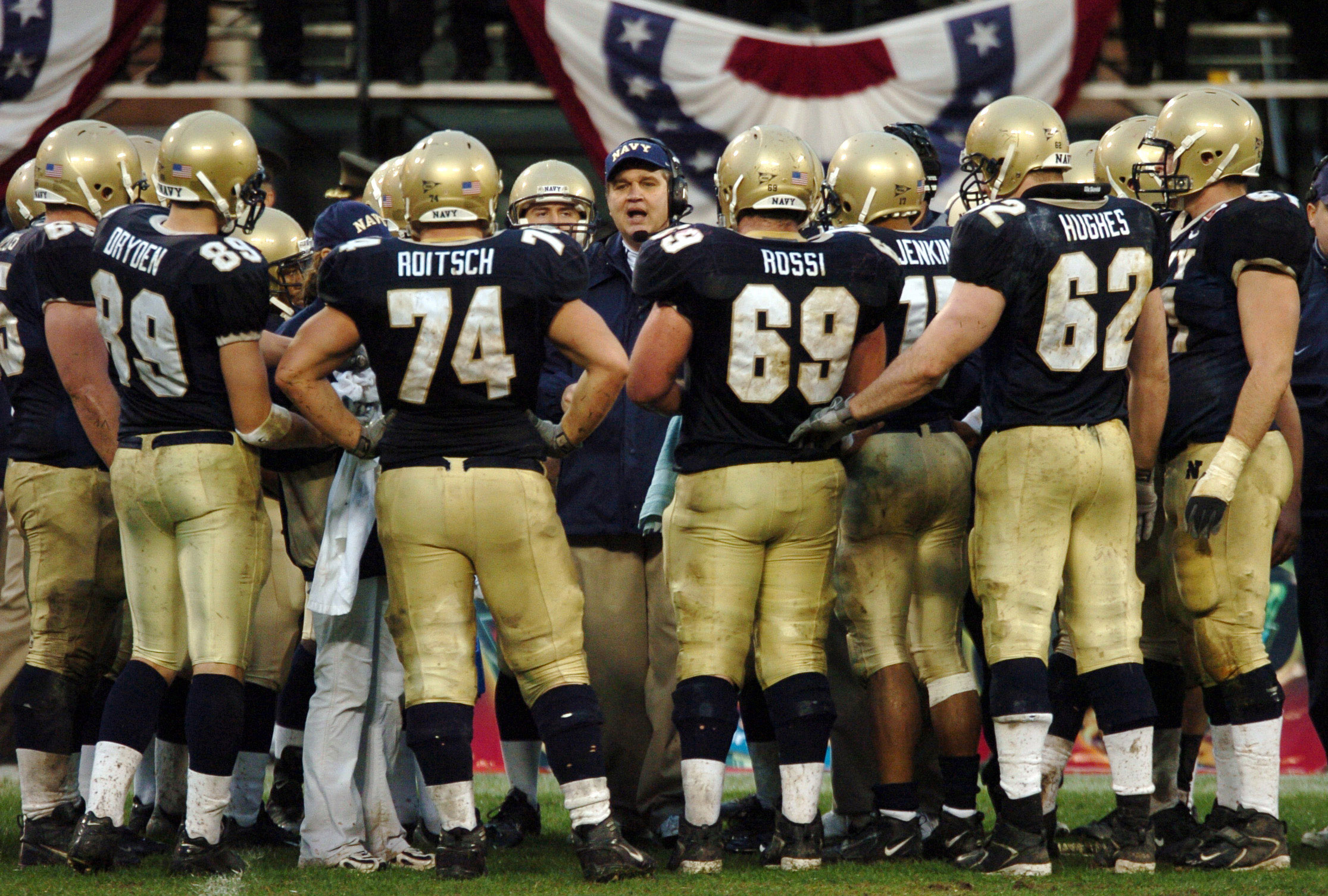
Coach Paul Johnson (center) discusses strategy with Navy Midshipmen football players during a time out at the 2004 Emerald Bowl.

In gridiron football, either team may call for a timeout while the ball is dead. They can be called by players (typically the quarterback or a linebacker) or by the head coach. Importantly, the clock stops if it is running when the timeout is called. Both teams may call one timeout during the same dead ball period. In American football (National Football League (NFL), college, and high school), each team is given three timeouts per half. In Canadian football, each team is given two timeouts per half in amateur leagues and two per game in the Canadian Football League (CFL). Two CFL timeout rules are used only in that league. First, timeouts can be carried over between the first and second halves. Second, a team can call only one timeout after the three-minute warning in the fourth quarter. In the NFL, timeouts are two minutes in length unless the requisite number of commercial breaks in the quarter have been used, or it is the second timeout in the same dead ball period, in which cases the timeout is 30 seconds long.

Common reasons for calling a timeout include:

- As part of the team's clock management strategy, discussed in detail below.
- To prevent the team from being assessed a penalty such as delay of game (offense) or too many men on the field (defense)
- To prevent a play from taking place when the coach is not confident in their team's play call

In the NFL, college football, and CFL, a timeout is assessed against a team if a head coach unsuccessfully challenges a play.

Because timeouts are such important parts of a team's clock management strategy, calling timeouts for other reasons is often seen as unfavorable. An analysis of timeout usage by NFL head coaches conducted during the 2021 season showed that more than half of the head coaches on average used more "unnecessary" timeouts (i.e., those used to prevent a penalty or an unfavorable play, or lost coach's challenges) per game than "time-saving" timeouts (i.e., those used to manage the game clock).

==== As clock management strategy ====
The use and rationing of time-outs is a major part of clock management strategy; calling time-out stops the clock (which normally is running between plays except in the case of a penalty, an incomplete pass, officials requiring time to re-spot the ball and/or down markers, or when the ball is run out of bounds), extending the time a team has to score. Timeouts can be called by both players (typically the quarterback or a linebacker) and the head coach. If overtime is required in the NFL, each team is given two timeouts during a ten-minute regular season sudden-death period (overtime periods are fifteen minutes in the playoffs), while in college football each team gets one timeout per possession. In the CFL, overtime is untimed and teams receive no additional timeouts. If a timeout above these limits is called, it is usually ignored and no penalty is assessed (however, in many leagues, a coach attempting to call a timeout when he has no timeouts left can be assessed a 5-yard Delay of Game penalty if the referees approve it).

Teams use several methods to stop the clock without exhausting a timeout. These include:

- Running out of bounds with the ball. In the NFL, this only stops the clock in the final two minutes of the first half and final five minutes of the second half; the rest of the time, the clock stops only temporarily, restarting when the ball is set for the next play. In arena football, the clock stops only for out-of-bounds plays in the final minute of the half.
- Throwing the ball out of bounds. This is an incomplete pass, and depending on the circumstances risks incurring an intentional grounding penalty, but sometimes, the team may choose to sacrifice a down to stop the clock.
- Spiking the ball. This act, likewise, is an incomplete pass and sacrifices a down, but when performed immediately after the snap is explicitly permitted without the risk of incurring an intentional grounding penalty.
- Waiting for the two-minute warning in the NFL and college football, three-minute warning in Canadian football, or one-minute warning in arena football if it is approaching. High school football does not have any of these stoppages, and college football did not adopt the two-minute warning until 2024.
- Committing an offense for which a minor penalty may be called. In some leagues, late in the game, a 10-second runoff is assessed to discourage such tactics.
- Feigning the injury of a player. If this occurs more than once in a game, a timeout may be charged, and/or a penalty may be assessed. In some leagues, if time is called because of an injury, the injured player may be ordered to sit out at least the next play as a way of discouraging the feigning of injury.

==== Icing the kicker ====
A common practice in gridiron football is to call a timeout right before a potential game-winning or game-tying field goal, a strategy known as "icing the kicker". In theory, this strategy is based on the presumption that the kicker has prepared himself mentally to make the kick only to have the timeout break his concentration. While this strategy has seemingly worked on occasion, statistics suggest that not only is this an ineffective strategy, but is actually counterproductive because kickers are more likely to make a field goal after a timeout is called—possibly because they have come to expect a timeout to be called, if the opposing team still has one. There have also been times when the tactic has directly backfired; for example, in an NFL game played on November 19, 2007, between the Denver Broncos and Tennessee Titans, Broncos head coach Mike Shanahan called a timeout to ice the kicker. It was difficult to hear the whistle and the play continued, with Titans kicker Rob Bironas badly shanking a 56-yard field goal. The play was restarted, this time without a timeout, and the kick was good. Since a team is not allowed to call multiple timeouts between plays, they are prohibited from trying to ice a kicker more than once on the same kick; attempting to do so results in an unsportsmanlike conduct penalty, giving the kicking team 15 yards and an automatic first down. It has only happened once in the NFL, in a 2007 game between the Buffalo Bills and the Washington Redskins, when Redskins head coach Joe Gibbs called a timeout just before Bills kicker Rian Lindell attempted a 51-yard field goal. The kick was good, but Gibbs was awarded the timeout. Gibbs then called a second timeout when Lindell was preparing to kick the ball again, because Gibbs was unaware of the rule. Gibbs was issued an unsportsmanlike conduct penalty, which narrowed the attempt from 51 yards to 36 yards out. Lindell made the 36-yard field goal to win the game for the Bills, 18–17.

==== Official timeouts ====
Game officials also have the authority to call their own time-outs, which unlike the team time-outs are unlimited. Such official time-outs can be used for instant replay reviews, to tend to an injury, to measure the spot of the ball with the chain crew or (in televised contests) to insert television commercials into the telecast.

=== Ice hockey ===
In ice hockey, each team is allowed one thirty-second time-out per game, which may only be taken during a normal stoppage of play. In the National Hockey League (NHL), only one team is permitted a time out during stoppage. However, in the International Ice Hockey Federation (IIHF) rules, both teams are permitted a time out during the same stoppage, but the second team must notify the referee before the opponent's time-out expires.

Since each team has only one time-out, they often reserve it for special situations, such as sudden changes in momentum of the game, resting players who have been on the ice for an extended period of time, and when they need to score a goal near the end of regulation time and wish to plan strategy.

In the NHL, teams lose their time-out if they unsuccessfully challenge a goaltender interference call, and cannot challenge if they are already without their time-out.

Since the 2017–18 season, teams cannot use their time-out after an icing call, except for the team not charged with the icing. In addition, they retain their timeout after every successful goaltender interference challenge; unsuccessful offside challenges result in a minor penalty for delay of game.

=== Team handball ===
In team handball, one sixty-second time-out per half per team is allowed. Time-outs are called by the head coach by handing a green time-out card to the match official, and can only be called when the team is in possession of the ball.

=== Pickleball ===
Three types of time-outs are permitted in the sport of pickleball.

- Regular time-out: A one-minute break in the game that can be called by either side. Two regular time-outs are allowed per side in an 11-point game. Time-outs are often used as a strategy to break the opponent's momentum.
- Medical time-out: Each player is permitted one 15-minute medical time-out per match. The time used must be continuous, meaning it cannot be broken up into multiple match interruptions.
- Referee time-out: A pause in play called by the referee to address any extenuating circumstances such as a safety concern.

=== Volleyball ===
In volleyball, the Fédération Internationale de Volleyball (FIVB) stipulates two 30-second time-outs allowed per team, per set. In FIVB World and Official Competitions, there are two additional 60-second technical time-outs in each set when the leading team reaches the 8th and 16th points, however there is no technical time-out in a tie-breaking set (5th set) (though there is a change of ends at 8 points).

NCAA men's and women's volleyball rules also allow two timeouts per team in each set, but the standard length is 75 seconds instead of 30. In women's play only, both teams' coaches can agree to modify timeout lengths to 60 or 90 seconds. A warning whistle is blown 15 seconds before the end of each timeout period, and any timeout can be ended early if both teams are ready to continue play. FIVB rules do not allow either practice.

U.S. high school rules are identical to NCAA rules, except that timeouts last only 60 seconds, and there is no provision for coaches to modify the length of timeouts (which can still be ended early if both teams are ready).

==== Beach volleyball ====
In beach volleyball, FIVB stipulates one 30-second time-out allowed per team, per set. In FIVB World Competitions, there is an additional 30-second technical time-out in sets 1–2 when the sum of both scores is equal to 21.

=== Water polo ===
In water polo, each team is entitled two sixty-second time-outs in regular time, and one extra time-out in extra time. The time-out can only be called if the team is in possession of the ball.

== Criticism ==
Time-outs have been criticized for slowing games down and thus diminishing their entertainment value.

== See also ==
- Truce term
