= Incomplete pass =

Unsuccessful pass in gridiron football

An incomplete pass is a term in gridiron football which means that a legal forward pass is not successfully caught by an eligible offensive player within the field of play. An incomplete pass can occur if (1) the ball hits the ground in the field of play before a player on either team gains possession; (2) the ball is caught by a player on either team who, at the moment of possession is out of bounds; or (3) the ball is thrown outside the field of play. An incomplete pass causes the down to advance by one and the offensive team gains no yards. The game clock is stopped, and the ball immediately becomes dead as soon as it touches the ground or goes out of bounds.

== Becoming a fumble or interception ==
If the receiver catches the ball and has possession of it, then loses control of it for any reason and a player from the other team catches it a fumble is called. In the NFL, both feet must be in bounds and the player must have clear control of the ball and make a football move or have the ability to perform such an act. In other leagues, only one foot must be in bounds with clear possession carrying a lighter burden of proof.

If a member of the opposing team gains possession of the ball within the field of play, before it hits the ground, it is ruled an interception.

== Pass interference ==
If the receiver (or a defending player) is touched by a member of the opposing team in a way that prevents him from catching the ball, it is ruled pass interference, resulting in a penalty against the touching player's team. The exception to this rule is if the ball is deemed "uncatchable" by the referees, in which case a pass interference penalty is impossible.

== Intentional incomplete pass ==
Often, whenever defensive players blitz the quarterback, to avoid a sack, the quarterback will do what is known as "throwing the football away". This is a deliberate incomplete pass thrown away from players to avoid loss of yardage. The intentional grounding penalty imposes restrictions on the legality of this move. The quarterback can legally throw the football away past the line of scrimmage when he leaves the pocket (defined in terms of the offensive tackle), and may not spike the ball except for the following case.

Since an incomplete pass also stops the clock, it allows clock management. This is also the only time a spike can legally be performed. Until the early 1990s, spiking was unconditionally intentional grounding, so the quarterback would immediately throw the ball towards the sidelines near the wide receiver.

== Lateral passes ==
Incomplete pass rules only apply to forward passes. A lateral pass which strikes the ground is instead played as a fumble, meaning, as long as the ball does not go out of bounds, it may be recovered and advanced by either team after striking the ground.

== League rules ==
The specifics of what constitutes an incomplete pass vary among leagues and throughout time. For instance, at the time of the Immaculate Reception, an NFL rule stated in the pertinent part that once an offensive player touches a pass, he is the only offensive player eligible to catch the pass. "However, if a [defensive] player touches [the] pass first, or simultaneously with or subsequent to its having been touched by only one [offensive] player, then all [offensive] players become and remain eligible" to catch the pass; this rule was later rescinded in 1978.
