= Technical foul =

Basketball foul which does not involve physical contact between players

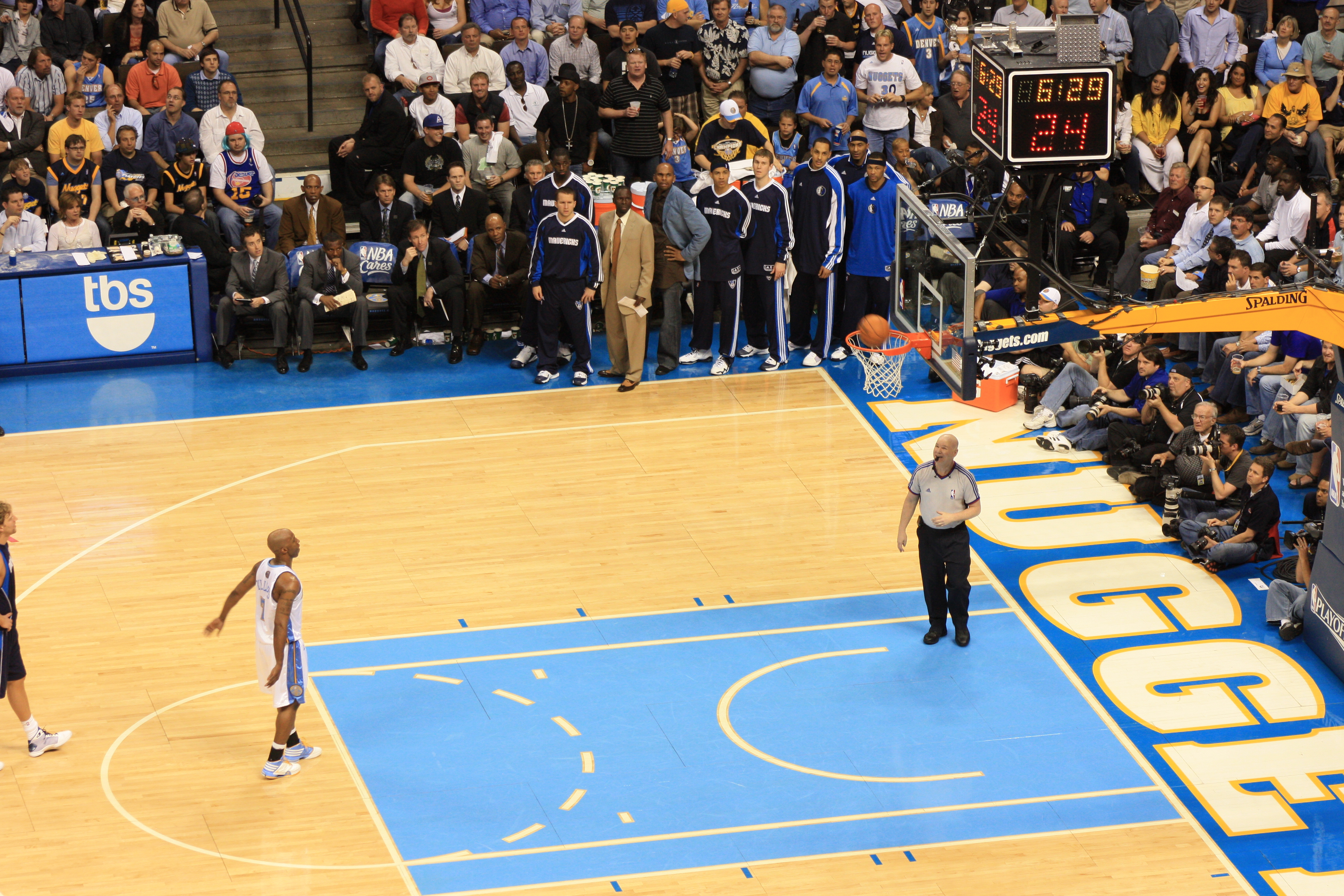
Former NBA player Chauncey Billups at the free throw line after a technical foul was called.

In basketball, a technical foul (colloquially known as a "T" or a "tech") is any infraction of the rules penalized as a foul which does not involve physical contact during the course of play between opposing players on the court, or is a foul by a non-player. The most common technical foul is for unsportsmanlike conduct. Technical fouls can be assessed against players, bench personnel, the entire team (often called a bench technical), or even the crowd. These fouls, and their penalties, are more serious than a personal foul, but not necessarily as serious as a flagrant foul (an ejectable offense in leagues below the National Basketball Association (NBA), and potentially so in the NBA).

Technical fouls are handled slightly differently under international rules than under the rules used by the various competitions in the United States. First, illegal contact between players on the court is always a personal foul under international rules, whereas in the United States, such contact is, with some exceptions, a technical foul when the game clock is not running or when the ball is dead. Second, in FIBA play (except for the half-court 3x3 variant, in which individual personal foul counts are not kept), players foul out after five total fouls, technical and personal combined (since 2014, one technical can be included towards the total; committing another risks immediate ejection). The latter rule is similar to that in college, high school, and middle school basketball in the United States. However, in leagues that play 48-minute games such as the NBA, and in some leagues such as the Women's National Basketball Association (WNBA), players are allowed six personal fouls before being disqualified, and technical fouls assessed against them do not count toward this total. However, unsportsmanlike technicals in the (W)NBA carry a fine, its severity depending on the number of technicals the player has already obtained, and players are suspended for varying amounts of time after accumulating sixteen technicals in the regular season or seven in the playoffs.

In most American competitions, ejection of the offender, that of the player, coach, or otherwise, is the penalty for being assessed two technical fouls in a game, if charged directly to them (some technicals committed by a player are charged to the team only). In addition, any single flagrant technical foul, or a disqualifying foul in FIBA and NCAA women's play, incurs ejection. FIBA rules call for ejection for two non-flagrant technicals (known as unsportsmanlike fouls under that body's rules; the term is also used in NCAA women's rules) against a player. FIBA rules call for ejection when a coach draws two technicals, or a third is called on the bench. In the NBA, there are certain technical fouls that cannot involve an ejection.

== Infractions ==
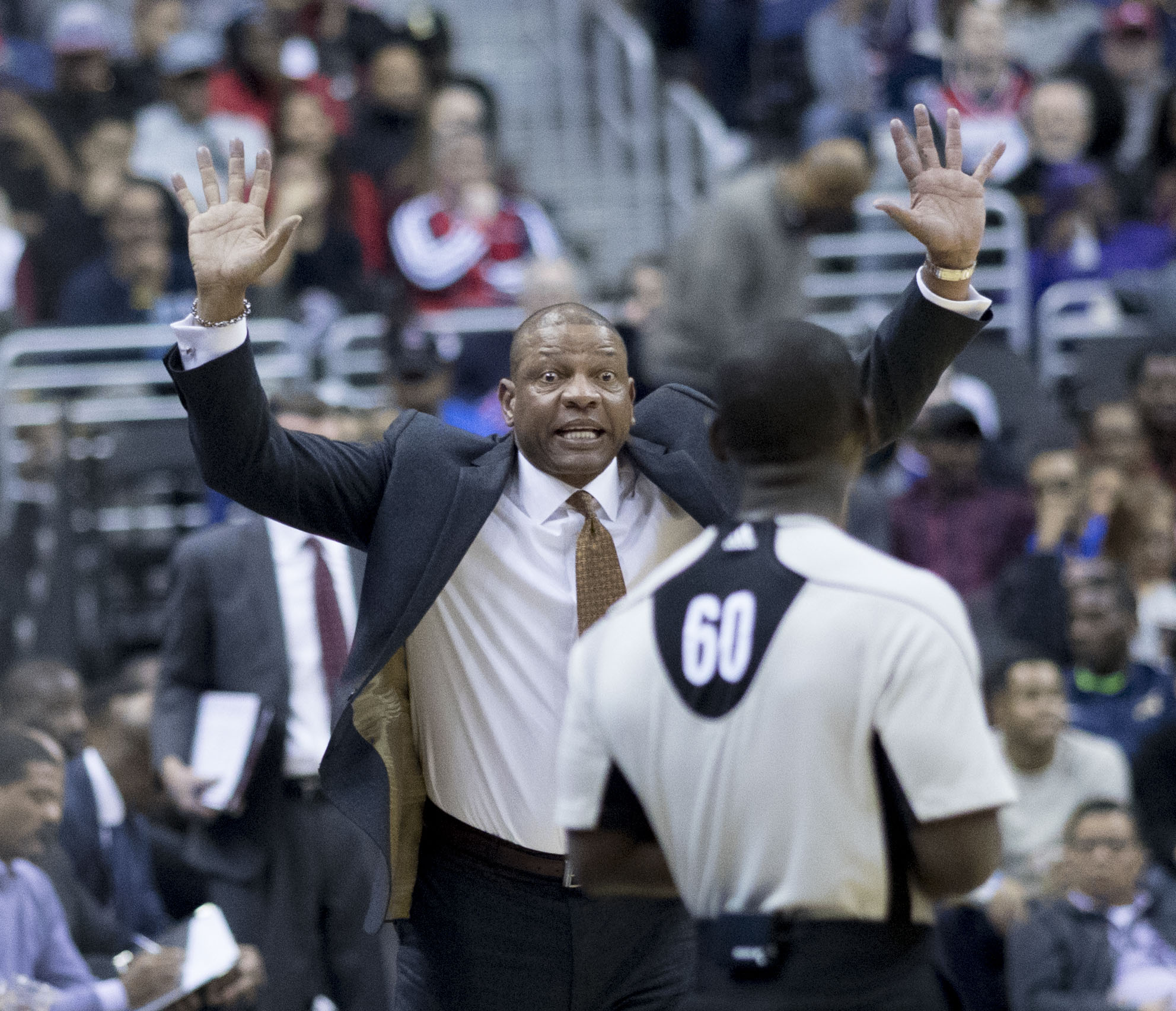
The act of disrespectfully addressing or contacting an official, or gesturing in such a manner as to indicate resentment, is an example of a technical foul.

Many infractions can result in the calling of a technical foul. One of the most common is the use of profane language toward an official or another player. This can be called on either players who are currently active in the play of the game, or seated on a team's bench. It can also be assessed to a coach or another person associated with the team in an official capacity such as a trainer or an equipment manager. Additionally, coaches or players can be assessed a technical foul for disputing an official's call too vehemently, with or without the use of profanity. This verbal unsporting technical foul may be assessed regardless of whether the ball is dead or alive.

Other offenses can result in technical fouls, such as:

- Allowing players to lock arms in order to restrict the movement of an opponent (usually a team technical)
- Baiting or taunting an opponent
- Disrespectfully addressing or contacting an official or gesturing in such a manner as to indicate resentment
- Faking being fouled (flopping). In NCAA women's basketball, effective in 2023–24, the first offense is a warning, with subsequent offenses being technical fouls assessed as team personal fouls, but not as individual personal fouls.
- Fighting or threatening to fight
- Goaltending a free throw
- Grasping either basket during pre-game or halftime warm-ups during the time of the officials' jurisdiction, including attempting to dunk or stuff a dead ball (whether successful or not) prior to or during the game or during any intermission of the game. Beginning in 2015–16, dunking is permitted during warmup periods in NCAA play, although hanging on the rim remains illegal.
- Illegal substitution or entering the game at an impermissible time
- Intentionally hanging on the basket at any time (except to prevent an injury)
- Kicking or striking the basketball at any time using the foot in an unsportsmanlike manner (unintentional kicking is a violation only)
- Knowingly attempting a free throw or accepting a foul to which the player was not entitled
- Lifting or jumping onto a teammate to gain a height advantage
- Remaining out of bounds to gain an advantage
- Removing the jersey or pants within the visual confines of the playing area
- Shattering the backboard or rim of a goal
- Use of television monitoring or replay equipment, computers, or electronics such as megaphones for coaching purposes during the game
- Using tobacco or smokeless tobacco

Violations of the rules for delaying the game (in the NBA, NCAA, and NFHS) usually incur a team warning for a first offense, followed by a team technical, or sometimes a player technical, if the same team delays a second time. From 2023–24, NCAA women's rules explicitly call for delay of game to be a team warning on the first offense and a team technical thereafter. This includes:

- Going out of bounds during an opponent's throw-in without contact (warning, then a technical foul), or touching an opposing thrower-in (intentional foul on the violator in NFHS, and is the warning for being out-of-bounds) or the ball (a technical on the offender in NFHS, and is the warning for being out-of-bounds) as it is held entirely in out-of-bounds
  - In the (W)NBA, or since 2022, FIBA, during the last two minutes of any playing period (quarter or overtime), contact by a defensive player against a player throwing the basketball in before the ball is released is not considered delay of game. It is instead a special class of personal foul known as a "throw-in foul" (FIBA) or "away from the play foul" (W(NBA)), and is penalized by one free throw and possession.
- Huddling at the foul line for an excessive time (warning, then a technical in NFHS)
- Not being ready to start play after a time-out, or to begin a quarter or half, or to shoot a free throw(s) at such times (a special protocol, known as the "resumption-of-play procedure", is used in NFHS, where violations instead of technicals are initially called in some such situations)
- Refusing to immediately pass the ball to the nearest official when a whistle blows
- Failing as the free thrower to be in the free-throw semicircle when the official is ready to administer the free throw (unless the resumption-of-play procedure is in effect in NFHS, supra)
- Throwing the ball into the stands or otherwise preventing a ball from being made live promptly after a made goal to allow one's team to set up on defense (if a blatantly unsportsmanlike act, a technical foul against the player; otherwise, a warning to that team and team technicals thereafter). This includes throwing the ball to an official when such act is not required—such would likely incur a warning. In addition, throwing the ball at an opponent's head may also be considered a technical foul.

and more technical issues, such as:

- Beginning the game with a starting player not so designated
- Failure to supply the scorer with names and numbers of team players prior to the start of the scheduled contest, or at least ten minutes prior to the contest in some jurisdictions
- Having too many players on the court, or too few (NBA; NCAA and NFHS if intentional)
- If the coach leaves their box, especially to argue. There are times when a coach may go to the scorer's table to correct a game error.
- Failing, as the coach, to replace a disqualified player within the allotted time (charged to the coach)
- (NBA only) playing a "scratched" player (a rule adopted in 2005 where up to two "scratches" are permissible on a 14-man roster)
- Refusing to occupy the proper bench
- Remaining in or returning to the game after being disqualified
  - In the NBA, there must be five players on the court at all times. A Player Foul Penalty situation exists if a player is assessed a sixth or subsequent personal foul and must remain in the game because there are no eligible players on the bench, or if after an injury or ejection, the last player to be disqualified for their sixth personal foul must return to the game. The penalty is a technical foul (with one free throw) for each extra personal foul or returning to the game after disqualification.
- Requesting an excess time-out
- Uniform violations, including illegal insignia or numbers; having two or more players with the same number; or having the wrong number for a player in the official scorebook

The NBA has an Illegal Defense rule. Until 2001, it was designed to stop defenders from dropping back into a zone and thus preventing drives to the basket. The penalty, after a warning, was a technical foul charged to the offending team and one shot for the offense, except that if the first violation occurred within 24 seconds of the end of a period, the technical was assessed without warning.

Beginning with the 2001–02 NBA season, the rule, now known as "Defensive Three Seconds," prohibits a defender from being in the shooting lane for three seconds, unless guarding an opponent within arm's reach (or the player with the ball, regardless of distance). The penalty is the same as it was for an illegal defense, except that no warning is issued. The WNBA implemented this rule in 2013. Any technical fouls for Illegal Defense do not count towards ejection.

Additionally, home teams can be assessed technical fouls resulting from their fan's misconduct for excessive use of artificial noise, the playing of music by their band, or for dangerous offenses such as throwing items (particularly ice or coins) onto the court.

Usually a fight or lesser altercation between players results in a "double technical", in which a technical foul is issued to both players involved. If any player leaves the team bench during a fight, they can be charged with a technical foul and ejected, as can any coach that does so without the beckoning of an official. Rules against fighting vary from high school to college to the (W)NBA, but all levels penalize severely for such conduct, to include suspensions and (in the [W]NBA) heavy fines. NFHS and NCAA require the automatic ejection of bench personnel leaving the team area during a fight, whether or not these players actually participate in the fight.

Beginning with the 2010–11 NBA season, the NBA began to crack down on general complaining. Technical fouls can now be issued for the following:

- Making aggressive gestures anywhere on the court
- Disagreement in which a player demonstrates how they were fouled
- Running toward an official to complain about a call
- Excessive inquiries about a call

== Penalty ==
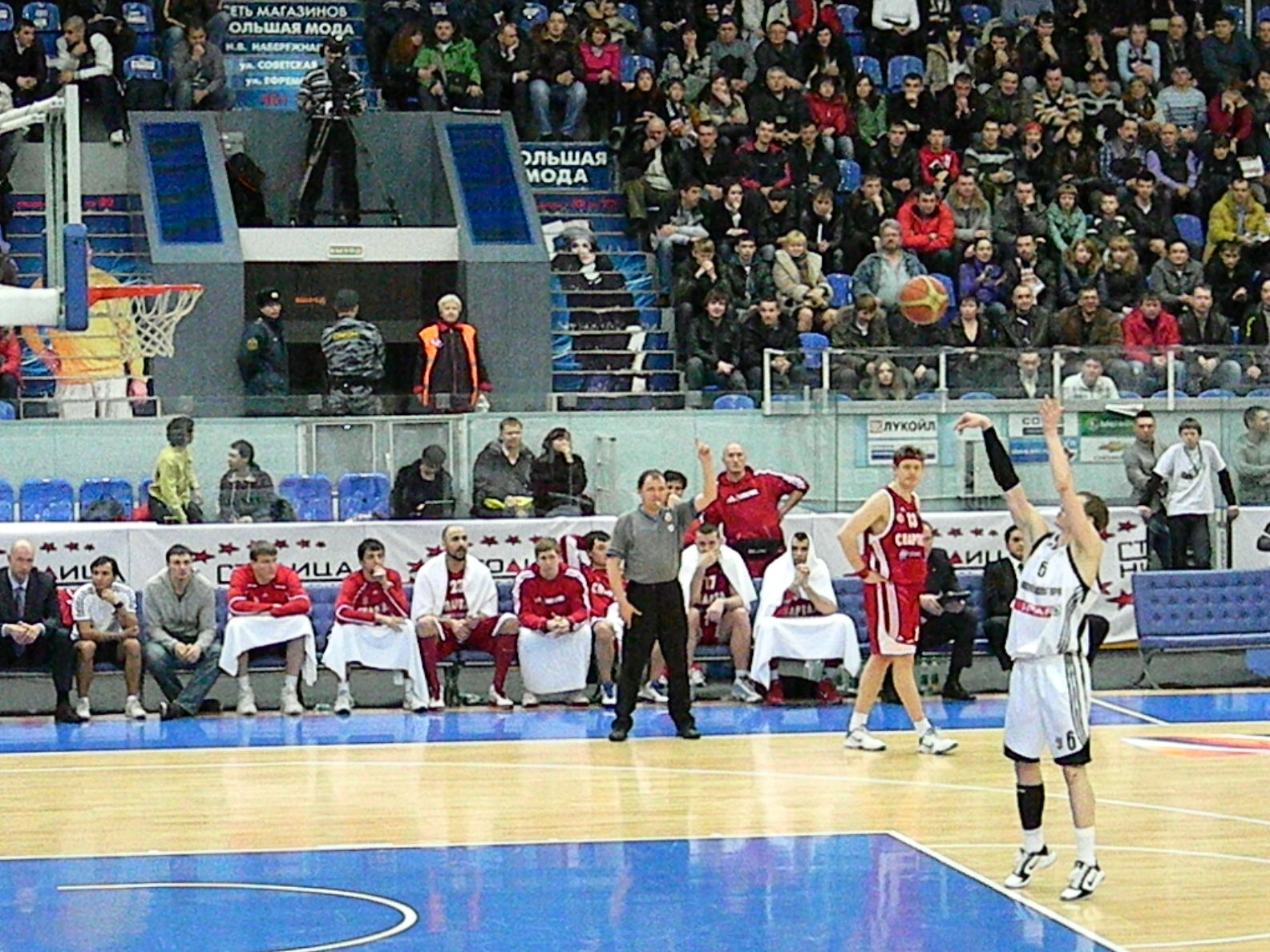
When shooting a free throw for a technical foul, only the free throw shooter, in this case Andrei Ivanov, is allowed within the area below the free throw line extended.

In college basketball, NFHS, and lower divisions, the penalty for technical fouls has increased over the years. Initially, the opposing team was awarded one free throw. This later increased to one free throw and possession of the ball. For a while, "bench technicals" assessed on a non-active player, assistant coach, or anyone else on the team bench were considered more serious and resulted in the award of two shots. (Coaches have their own technical fouls, although they may be ejected and/or suspended if they have a mix of technicals totaling two or three fouls, depending on seriousness.)

Today, high school basketball (NFHS in the United States) provides for two free throws and possession of the ball at the division line opposite the scorer's table, regardless of circumstances, for a technical foul. International basketball provides a similar penalty. Before the 2015–16 season, college basketball awarded two shots for all technical fouls, with the ball then put in play at the "point of interruption", the spot and circumstances where play was stopped for the technical. Since 2015–16, the NCAA awards only one free throw for so-called "Class B" technicals, such as hanging on the rim or delay of game; "Class A" technical fouls still result in two free throws. In the WNBA and NBA, the penalty remains one free throw for the opposing team, with play resuming from the point of interruption. The shot clock is reset to 14 seconds if it read less than that at the time of the foul. The team awarded the free throws for a technical may select the player(s) to shoot them (this rule differs slightly from level to level and internationally), as opposed to personal fouls, where the player fouled, unless injured, must shoot their own free throws.

In the NBA, WNBA, and FIBA (as of October 2026), technical fouls are split into two classes, unsportsmanlike (Type 1 in FIBA) and non-unsportsmanlike (Type 2 in FIBA). A player assessed an unsportsmanlike technical foul is fined, and accumulating sixteen unsportsmanlike technical fouls during the regular season will result in a one-game suspension. For every two technical fouls received thereafter during that regular season, the player or coach's suspension increases by one game. Penalties for unsportsmanlike technical fouls are even higher for playoff games. Players and coaches will be fined for every unsportsmanlike technical foul they receive. Those who accumulate seven unsportsmanlike technical fouls will be suspended for one game. For every two unsportsmanlike technical fouls received thereafter, the player or coach's next suspension increases by one game.

Non-unsportsmanlike conduct technical fouls are based on administrative issues, and not unsportsmanlike acts, where none count towards a fine, ejection or suspension. These fouls are assessed for excessive time-outs, defensive three seconds, scratched player dressing and playing, a player foul penalty situation, shattering backboards, or delay of game. An offensive player who intentionally hangs on the backboard, unless it is for safety reasons, is fined $500 but is only assessed a non-unsportsmanlike conduct technical foul. Technical fouls assessed for a player foul penalty situation caused by an offensive foul still result in one free throw.

The league can reclassify an unsportsmanlike conduct technical foul as a non-unsportsmanlike conduct technical foul after a game. For example, the NBA changed the technical foul by DeMarcus Cousins for clearing Jeremy Lamb's loose shoe off the playing court in a Golden State Warriors v. Charlotte Hornets game on February 25, 2019, from unsportsmanlike to non-unsportsmanlike, rescinding the fine and the foul count, primarily over safety issues.

== Notable instances ==
One of the most notable technical fouls ever assessed was called on Chris Webber of the University of Michigan late in the 1993 NCAA championship game. Down by two points to North Carolina with only seconds remaining, Webber called a time-out when Michigan had none left. After the referees approved his request, the resulting excessive time-out technical foul, for which North Carolina guard Donald Williams made both foul shots, ended any hopes Michigan had of claiming the championship.

A string of technical fouls occurred on February 23, 1985, at a regular season game between the rival Purdue Boilermakers and Indiana Hoosiers. Just five minutes into the game, a scramble for a loose ball resulted in a foul call on Indiana. IU's head coach Bob Knight was furious and insisted the call should have been a jump ball. Seconds after Purdue inbounded, another foul was called on Indiana. Knight received a technical for his irate reaction, and then famously threw a red plastic chair from Indiana's bench across the court, resulting in a second technical. As his tirade continued, he received a third technical and was ejected from the game to a standing ovation from the home crowd at Simon Skjodt Assembly Hall. The picture of Knight throwing the chair has since become a potent symbol of the Indiana–Purdue rivalry.

In what has been called "the greatest game ever played", Game 5 of the 1976 NBA Finals between the Phoenix Suns and Boston Celtics, the Suns found themselves one point down with one second left in double overtime, no time-outs remaining and possession of the ball under their defensive basket after a John Havlicek bucket. Faced with the near-impossibility of sinking an 80-foot desperation shot, Suns guard Paul Westphal hit upon an unusual solution. He intentionally called a time-out the Suns did not have. While this gave the Celtics a free throw, which Jo Jo White successfully converted to increase the lead to two, it gave the Suns possession at halfcourt, and enabled Gar Heard to sink an 18-footer as time expired to force a third overtime. NBA rules were changed the following year to prevent a repeat occurrence.

An instance where many technical fouls could have been called, but were not (instead, the game was abandoned, a remedy available to the officials when too many players would have or have been disqualified or ejected for the game to continue, or when a team continually commits technical fouls in order to make a travesty of proceedings), was the Pacers–Pistons brawl involving players and spectators on November 19, 2004, in an NBA game between the Indiana Pacers and Detroit Pistons. Ron Artest of the Pacers and Ben Wallace of the Pistons began scuffling after Artest fouled Wallace hard. This escalated into a brawl where players from both teams became involved, and grew worse after Artest retreated to the scorer's table and was hit by a cup thrown by a spectator. Artest and several teammates and opponents then ran into the stands and fought with fans. Had technical fouls been formally assessed, the result would likely have been the ejection of both teams' entire squads (except for Pistons player Tayshaun Prince, who was the only player from either team to remain on the bench for the entire incident). In the end, nine players were suspended for a total of 146 games, including Artest for the remainder of the season.

In a 2007 game against the Dallas Mavericks, San Antonio Spurs' power forward Tim Duncan was charged a technical foul by referee Joe Crawford for laughing at him while sitting on the bench ("gesturing in such a manner as to indicate resentment," as indicated above). As he had already picked up a technical foul on the previous play, also while sitting on the bench, this led to his ejection. Upon further review it was determined that the second technical foul was inconsistent with the league's game management, and NBA commissioner David Stern suspended referee Crawford for the rest of the season. Duncan was fined $25,000 for the incident.

On October 25, 2022, the Golden State Warriors and the Phoenix Suns set the record for most combined technical fouls in a quarter with seven in the third quarter.

Rasheed Wallace holds the record for the most technical fouls received during one season in the NBA. In the 2000–01 NBA season, he received 41 technical fouls in 80 regular season and postseason games played. Karl Malone holds the career mark for most technical fouls by a player in the regular season with 332, a record previously held by Dennis Rodman.

There have been a few instances in the NBA when a team's entire bench has either been injured or fouled out, and one of the five remaining eligible players fouls out, resulting in the technical foul that effectively acts as a bonus free throw situation. The Atlanta Hawks' Cliff Levingston (fouled out, but one of the five remaining players was ejected) and the Los Angeles Lakers' Robert Sacre (fouled out) have both taken advantage of the disqualified player rule. Under NBA Rule 3-I-a (player fouls out) and 3-I-b (player injured or ejected), the player was assessed with a technical foul for remaining in the game or returning to the game after fouling out.

== List of NBA career technical fouls leaders ==
The following list shows the NBA players with the most career technical fouls (regular season + playoffs).

^	Active NBA player

Statistics accurate as of November 2, 2026.

No.	Name	Total	Regular Season	Playoffs	Play-In	Ref(s)
1	Karl Malone	377	332	45	--	
2	Rasheed Wallace	373	317	56	--	
3	Charles Barkley	356	329	27	--	
4	Gary Payton	278	250	28	--	
5	Dennis Rodman	272	212	60	--	
6	Jerry Sloan	220	205	15	--	
7	Draymond Green^	218	179	36	3	
8	Russell Westbrook	212	187	25	0	
9	Dwight Howard	210	171	39	0	
10	Anthony Mason	207	192	15	--	
11	Charles Oakley	195	168	27	--	
12	Kevin Garnett	194	176	18	--	
13	Kobe Bryant	193	166	27	--	
14	Chris Paul	192	176	16	0	
15	Vernon Maxwell	188	171	17	--	
16	Kevin Willis	180	170	10	--	
17	Carmelo Anthony	179	166	13	--	
18	Reggie Miller	175	161	14	--	
19	Shaquille O'Neal	171	150	21	--	
20	Kurt Thomas	168	157	11	--	
20	Rick Mahorn	168	145	23	--	

== See also ==
- Flagrant foul
