= Hack-a-Shaq =

Basketball strategy using intentional fouls

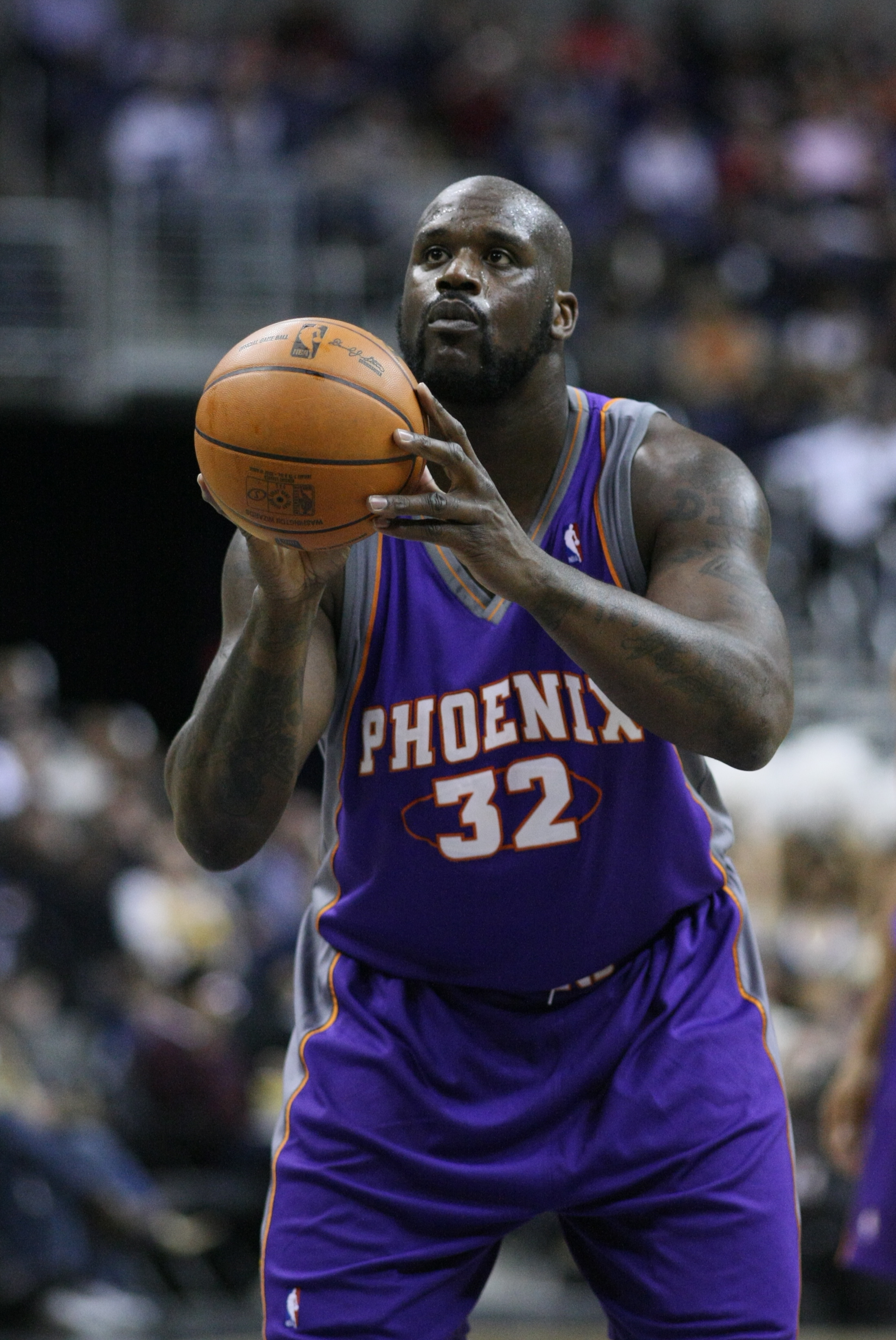
The strategy is named after Shaquille O'Neal, who is pictured here taking a free throw. O'Neal's poor free throw shooting was used against him.

The Hack-a-Shaq is a basketball defensive strategy used in the National Basketball Association (NBA) that involves committing intentional fouls (originally a clock management strategy) for the purpose of lowering opponents' scoring. The strategy was originally adapted by Dallas Mavericks coach Don Nelson, who directed players to commit personal fouls throughout the game against selected opponents who poorly shot free throws.

Nelson initially used the strategy against power forward Dennis Rodman. However, the strategy acquired its name for Nelson's subsequent use of it against center Shaquille O'Neal.

== Name ==
The term was coined when O'Neal played at Louisiana State University and during his NBA tenure with the Orlando Magic. At the time, the term simply referred to playing physical defense against O'Neal. Teams sometimes defended him by bumping, striking or pushing him after he received the ball to deny him an easy layup or dunk. Because of O'Neal's poor free throw shooting, teams did not fear the consequences of committing personal fouls. However, once Nelson's off-the-ball fouling strategy became prevalent, the term Hack-a-Shaq was applied to this new tactic and the original usage was largely forgotten.

The name is sometimes altered to reflect the player being fouled, for example, Hack-a-Howard when used against Dwight Howard, Hack-a-DJ for DeAndre Jordan, or Hack-a-Ben for Ben Simmons and Ben Wallace. O'Neal himself has expressed that he dislikes the term.

== Background ==
=== Strategy of repeated intentional fouling ===
Committing repeated intentional personal fouls is a longstanding defensive strategy used by teams that are trailing near the end of the game. Basketball, unique among major world sports, permits intentional fouling to gain a strategic advantage; in other sports, it is considered an unfair act or professional foul.

Once the fouling team enters the bonus situation, the fouled team is awarded free throws. The average player makes a high enough percentage of his free throws that, over time, opponents' possessions that end with free throws will yield more points than possessions in which the opponents try to score a field goal. High scoring NBA teams only average about 1.1 points per possession. Giving such a team two free throws on each possession, a poor free throw shooting teams make around 70% of their free throws and would score 1.4 points per possession, which leads to no decrease in the opponent's scoring.

However, fouls stop and reset the shot clock. If a team is trailing with time running out, intentional fouling can be used to slow the game down. In normal game play, the opponents will stall and run out the clock, even at the expense of failing to score, to the extent that the shot clock allows. The trailing team fouls intentionally to end the opponents' possession as soon as possible, leaving more time on the clock for the opposing team to respond to any score. It may also hope that fatigue and pressure affect the ability of the free-throw shooter.

When the strategy was originally employed in the NBA, the trailing team often made a point of fouling the opposition player who was the poorest free throw shooter in the game at that time, even if that player did not possess the ball. However, off-the-ball fouling became a problem for the league when Wilt Chamberlain—a player of superstar caliber but a subpar free throw shooter—entered the NBA.

=== Wilt Chamberlain and off-the-ball foul rule ===
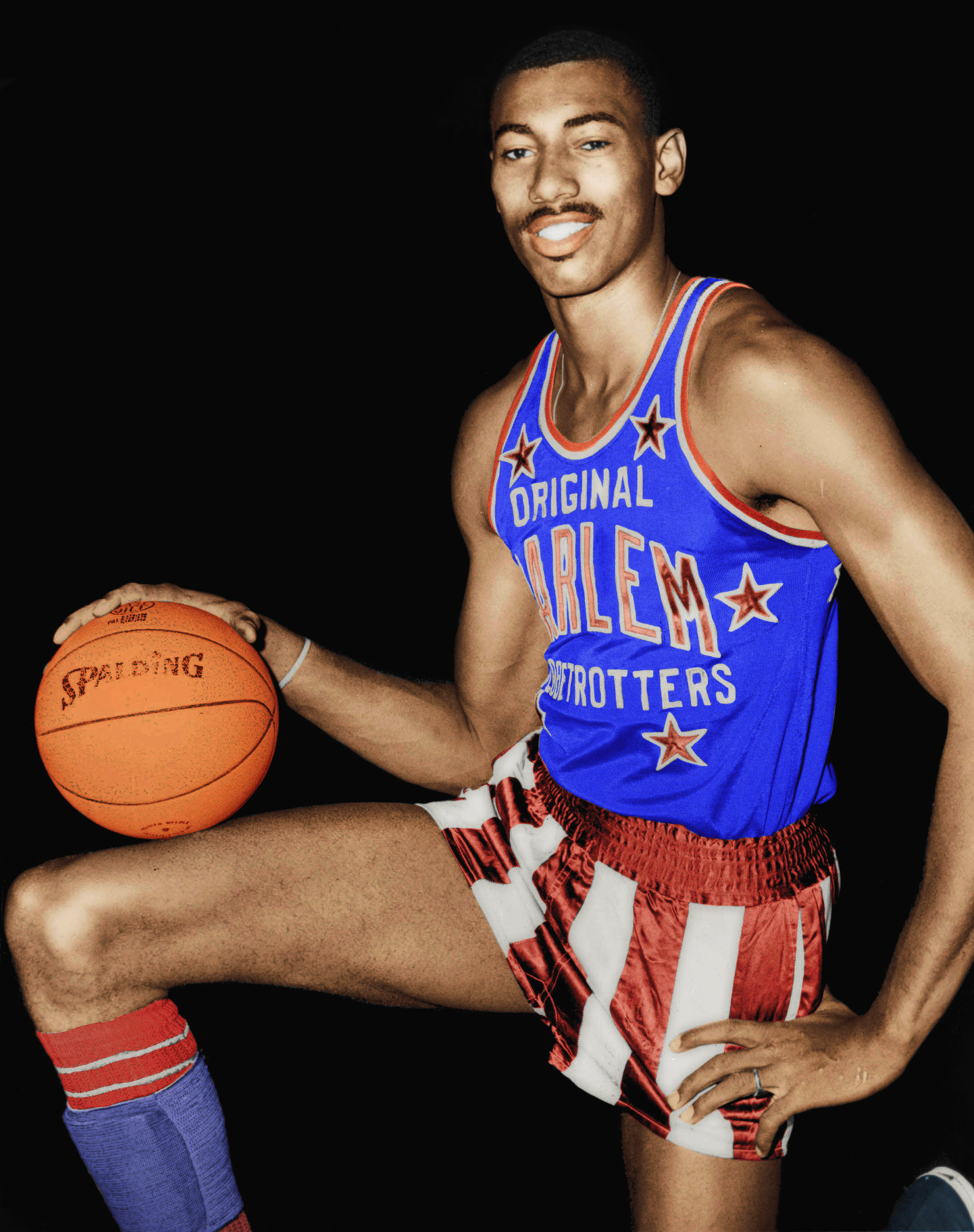
Wilt Chamberlain was a notoriously bad free throw shooter, shooting a career free-throw percentage of 51%.

Wilt Chamberlain was such a dominant player that he was sure to be on the floor near the end of any close game; however, as a poor free throw shooter, having a career free throw shooting percentage around 51%, he became a natural target of intentional fouling. The opposition would go to length to send Chamberlain to the free throw line, and Chamberlain would go to length to avoid being fouled. This led to a game of tag developing away from the basketball, with players chasing Chamberlain as he tried to avoid being fouled.

The NBA enacted a new rule on off-the-ball fouls—personal fouls against an offensive player who neither has the ball nor is trying to obtain it. On such fouls within the last two minutes of the game or in overtime, the offensive team is awarded the usual number of free throws and then possession of the ball. The new rule removed the benefit of fouling to gain possession of the ball and limited late-game intentional fouls to the ball handler.

The current version of the rule contains an additional disincentive to off-the-ball fouls: The free throws are not be attempted by the player who was fouled; the fouled team can choose any player on the court at the time as the shooter.

The reason they have that rule is that fouling someone off-the-ball looks foolish . . . Some of the funniest things I ever saw were players that used to chase [Wilt Chamberlain] like it was hide-and-seek. Wilt would run away from people and the league changed the rule based on how silly that looked.

—Pat Riley

== Hack-a-Shaq ==
=== Nelson's innovation ===
There are several late-game situations where committing an isolated intentional foul could be more helpful than hurtful. For a team trailing late in the game, stopping the clock is a higher priority than keeping the opponents from scoring. In other situations, intentional fouling typically lets the opponents score more points.

Intentional fouling every time the opponents get the ball was an innovation of Don Nelson in the late 1990s as coach of the Dallas Mavericks. He theorized that if the opponents played an especially bad free throw shooter, intentionally fouling him might lower his team's points per possession when compared to a conventional defense against them. Nelson used the strategy throughout the game, when the late-game penalties for off-the-ball fouls did not apply, such as the ball being given back to the fouled team.

However, Nelson did not invent the strategy, as his innovation was to take a strategy whose primary purpose had always been simply stopping the clock and use it instead primarily to minimize the opposition's scoring.

=== Hack-a-Rodman ===
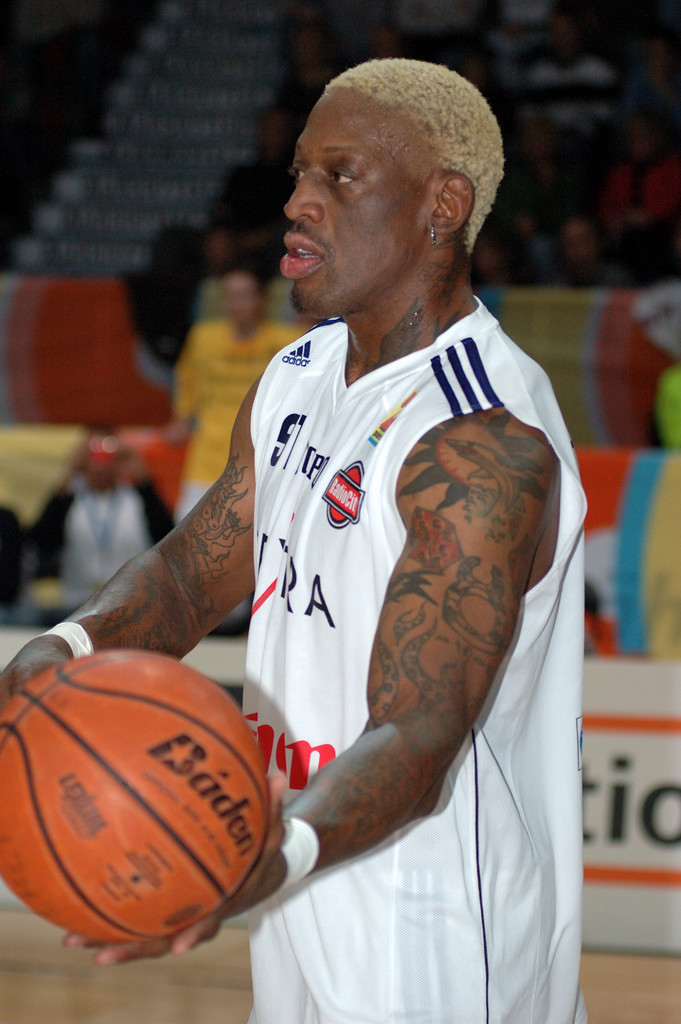
The Hack-a-Shaq strategy was originally used on Dennis Rodman, who shot a career free throw percentage of 58%.

Nelson first used the strategy against Dennis Rodman of the Chicago Bulls in 1997, who was making 38% of his free throws on the season. He could not use the strategy on every Bulls possession, as a player committing his sixth foul is fouled out from the game. He used the strategy selectively and chose a little-used player, whose absence the team could tolerate, to commit the fouls. He believed that Rodman's poor foul shooting would result in the Mavericks giving up fewer total points during those Bulls possessions than they would give up by playing a standard defense against the Bulls' efficient offense, led by Michael Jordan and Scottie Pippen.

In that game, however, Rodman shot 9-for-12 from the free throw line, defeating the strategy and the Bulls won the game. The strategy was thus largely forgotten, except for Mavericks player Bubba Wells, who had been assigned to foul Rodman, and set the all-time NBA record for fewest minutes played (3) before fouling out of a game.

=== Hack-a-Shaq ===
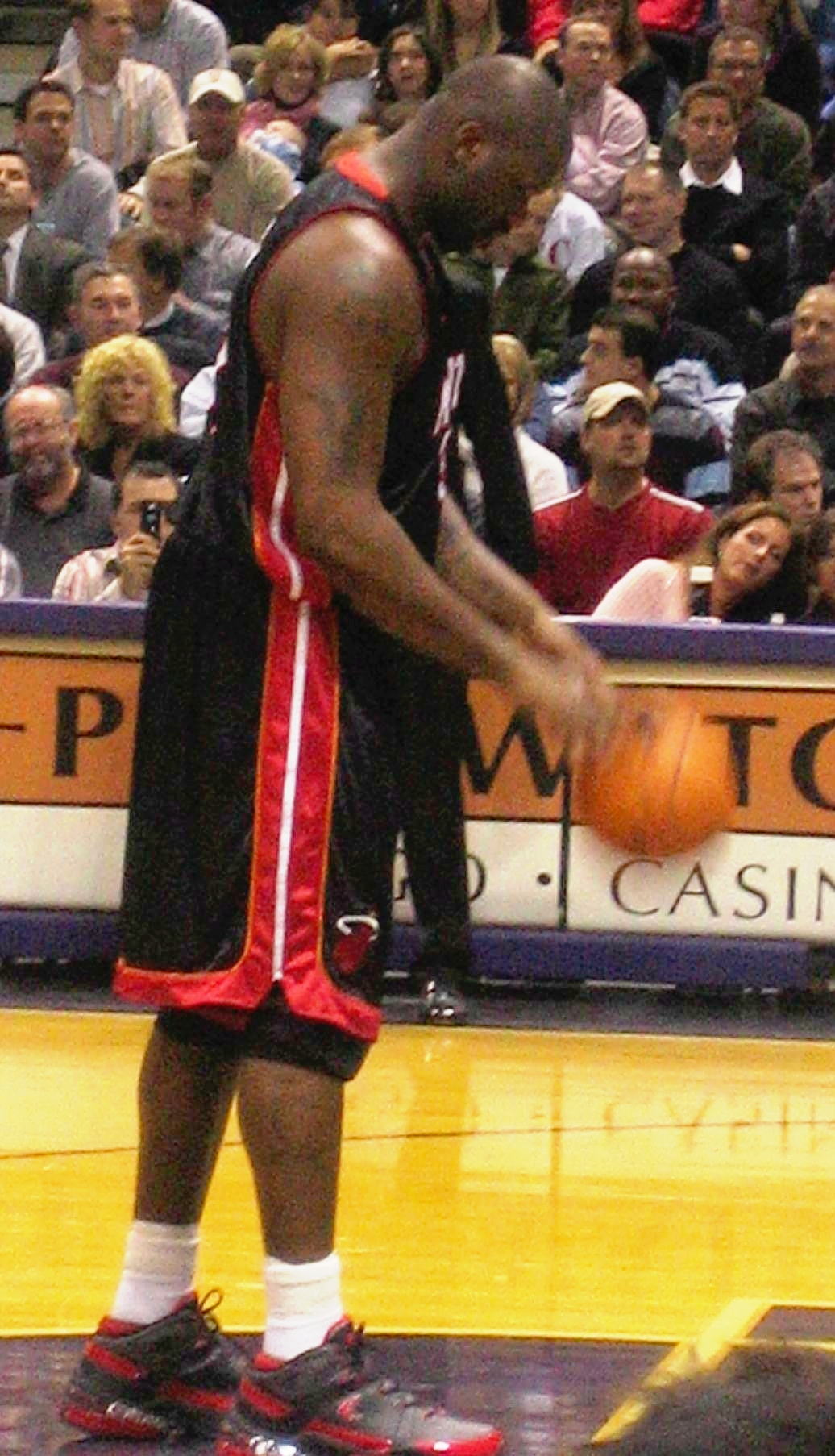
O'Neal's free throw shooting was regarded as one of his major weaknesses.

Nelson used the strategy again in 1999, this time against Shaquille O'Neal, a career 52% free throw shooter. Other NBA coaches also did so to defend against O'Neal. Despite the fact the strategy was first used two years earlier against Rodman, its greater success and usage in and after 1999 led to it primarily being known for its usage against O'Neal.

Nelson first deployed the strategy against O'Neal in the 1999–2000 season. O'Neal had a known weakness in free throw shooting, with a career average of 52.7%. He once missed all 11 of his free throw attempts in a game against the Seattle SuperSonics on December 8, 2000, an NBA record. As the strategy proliferated throughout the league, the Lakers hired Ed Palubinskas, a 90% free throw shooter in his playing days, to coach O'Neal on free throws. O'Neal's free throw percentage peaked at 62.2% in the 2002–03 season.

The only thing I call cowardly is when you're up by 10 and do it. That's a coward move and [Popovich] knows that and I'll make them pay for it. [The strategy] doesn't work. You know San Antonio tried it but they went home a couple weeks after we went home. I just have to go to the line and hit them and make them pay, and I will, I'm not worried.

—Shaquille O'Neal

While playing, O'Neal's attitude toward the strategy was generally one of defiance, claiming that he would make the most crucial free throws "when they count" and that the strategy simply would not work against him. O'Neal called Nelson "a clown" for using the strategy. In his next game against O'Neal, Nelson showed up wearing a clown nose. During the 2008–09 preseason, O'Neal expressed his disapproval of San Antonio Spurs coach Gregg Popovich and his team's use of the Hack-a-Shaq during the first round of the 2008 playoffs.

On October 29, 2008, Popovich poked fun at O'Neal, having Michael Finley commit an intentional foul five seconds into the first game of the regular season. O'Neal laughed when he looked over to the Spurs bench and saw Popovich smiling while giving two thumbs up, further asserting that it was a joke.

=== Problem for the league ===
As with Chamberlain decades earlier, intentional off-the-ball fouls against O'Neal became controversial. During the 2000 NBA playoffs, both the Portland Trail Blazers and Indiana Pacers relentlessly used the Hack-a-Shaq defense against the Lakers. The NBA discussed expanding the off-the-ball foul rule to cover more than just the final two minutes of the game, or adding another rule change that would discourage the use of Hack-a-Shaq. Ultimately, though, the NBA did not change any rules to discourage the Hack-a-Shaq strategy. A potential reason for the lack of action was that the Lakers won both of the most notorious games where Hack-a-Shaq was used, suggesting that the strategy was too ineffective to require remediation.

Gregg Popovich used the Hack-a-Shaq strategy successfully in Game 5 of the Spurs' 2008 first round series against O'Neal and the Phoenix Suns. O'Neal made only 9 of his 20 free throws, dropping the Suns to 20-of-37 total on free throws. The Suns were eliminated from the playoffs in a 92–87 Spurs win. In May 2008, ESPN columnist John Hollinger named the use of the Hack-a-Shaq by the Spurs as the "best tactic" of the first two rounds of the 2008 NBA playoffs. Hollinger wrote that Popovich was the "first to really master how to use this weapon to his advantage", and explained that Popovich used the tactic "to eliminate 3-point attempts" and with 25 seconds or less at the end of quarters to get the ball back for the Spurs to gain the last possession. Hollinger stated "This should be a Eureka! moment for other coaches and I expect it will be the league's most widely copied tactic next year."

In subsequent seasons, fans and media remained displeased with the continued use of the strategy, particularly in high-profile playoff games. In 2008, the NBA Competition Committee again considered rule changes but did not achieve consensus. According to an ESPN study in 2016, offensive efficiency was higher than the 2015–16 Golden State Warriors when the Hack-a-Shaq strategy was used against a team. NBA commissioner Adam Silver announced that the competition committee would look into changing the rule before the start of the 2016–2017 season due to extended length of games. It takes only three or more Hack-a-Shaq fouls to add 11 minutes to the length of a game and at the time such fouls were being committed at a rate of four times more often than the prior season.

== Use against other players ==
=== Dwight Howard ===
On January 12, 2012, the Golden State Warriors fouled Orlando Magic center Dwight Howard intentionally throughout the game. The result was he attempted a record 39 free throws, breaking Wilt Chamberlain's record of 34 set in 1962. Howard entered the game making 42% of his free throws for the season and just below 60% for his career. He made 21 of the 39 attempts and he finished with 45 points and 23 rebounds in the Magic's 117–109 victory. The following season, Howard was traded to the Lakers. In his first game back in Orlando on March 12, 2013, he made 25-of-39 free throws, setting Lakers records for free throws made and attempted while tying his NBA record for attempts. Howard made 16-of-20 free throws when he was fouled intentionally by the Magic.

=== Tiago Splitter ===
On May 29, 2012, the Oklahoma City Thunder used a so-called Hack-a-Splitter strategy on Tiago Splitter during Game 2 of Western Conference Finals of 2012 NBA Playoffs, who made 5 of 10 free throw attempts.

=== Josh Smith ===
On April 10, 2015, the Spurs were reported to use this strategy on Josh Smith to keep the basketball away from guard James Harden, with the Spurs winning this game by a score of 104–103.

=== DeAndre Jordan ===
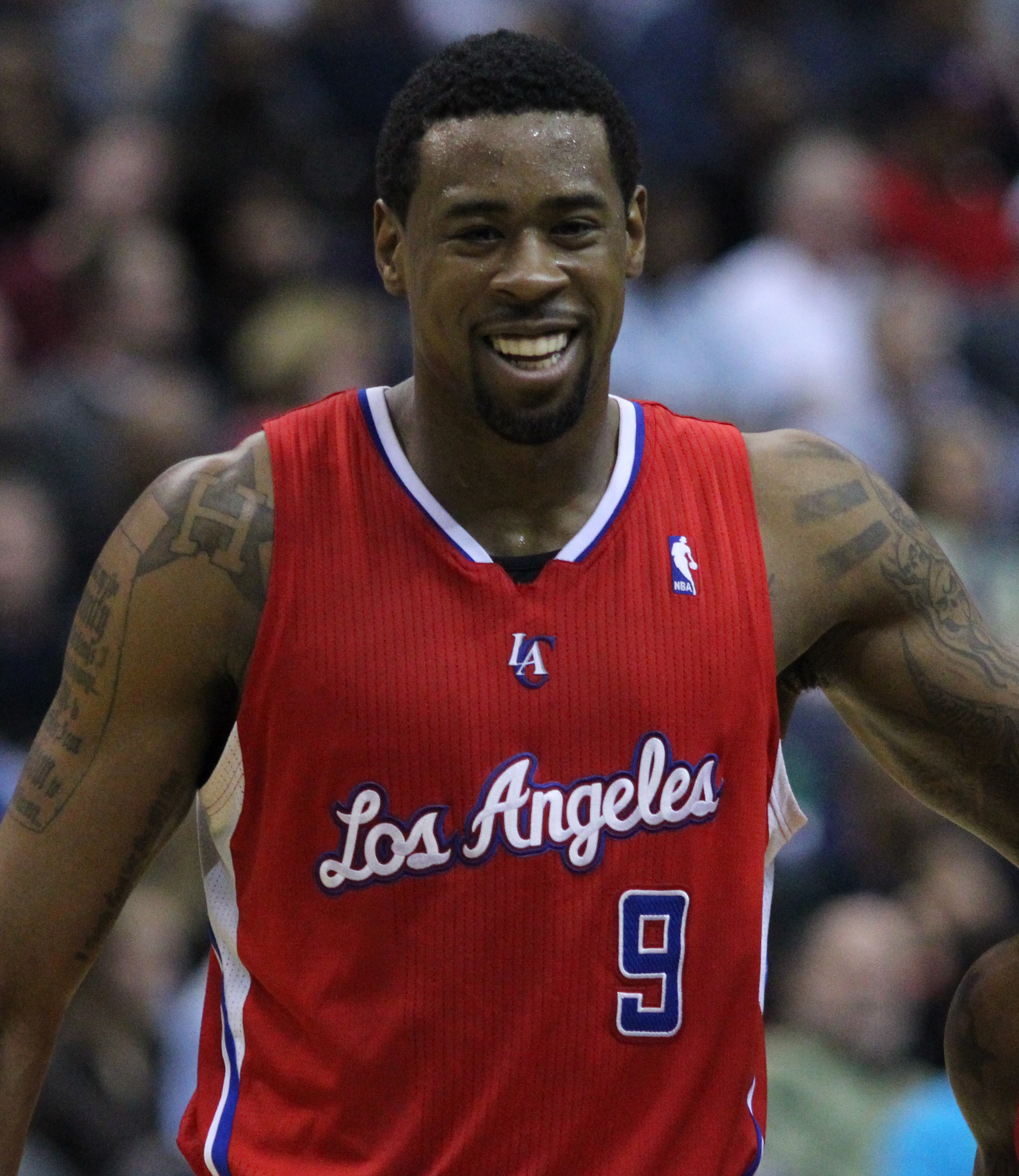
DeAndre Jordan has been a victim of the Hack-a-Shaq strategy.

During the 2015 NBA Playoffs, Howard, then with the Houston Rockets, was targeted often by opponents, particularly during round 2 against the Los Angeles Clippers. During Game 2, Howard made 8 of his 21 free throw attempts out of the 64 total free throws for the Rockets. In turn, the Rockets targeted DeAndre Jordan, who had been victim of Hack-a-Jordan or Hack-a-DJ since 2014, and in particular was fouled five times in two minutes during the previous playoff round against the Spurs. In Game 4, Jordan broke O'Neal's record for most free throw attempts in a half with 28.

=== Andre Drummond ===
On January 20, 2016, the Rockets (notably K.J. McDaniels) used Hack-a-Drummond against Detroit Pistons center Andre Drummond, with him going 13 for 36 from the free throw line. Drummond, missing 23 of his 36 attempts, are an NBA record for most free throws missed by a player in a game. However, the Pistons still won the game 123-114. On November 28, 2023, the Boston Celtics employed the Hack-a-Drummond strategy up 32 points against the Bulls, with the Celtics needing to win by at least 23 points to be guaranteed a spot in the NBA In-Season Tournament.

=== André Roberson ===
During the 2017 playoffs, Thunder forward André Roberson was a victim of this strategy, with the Rockets using it in the first round. Roberson shot 21 and only made 3 in the entire series.

=== Ben Simmons ===
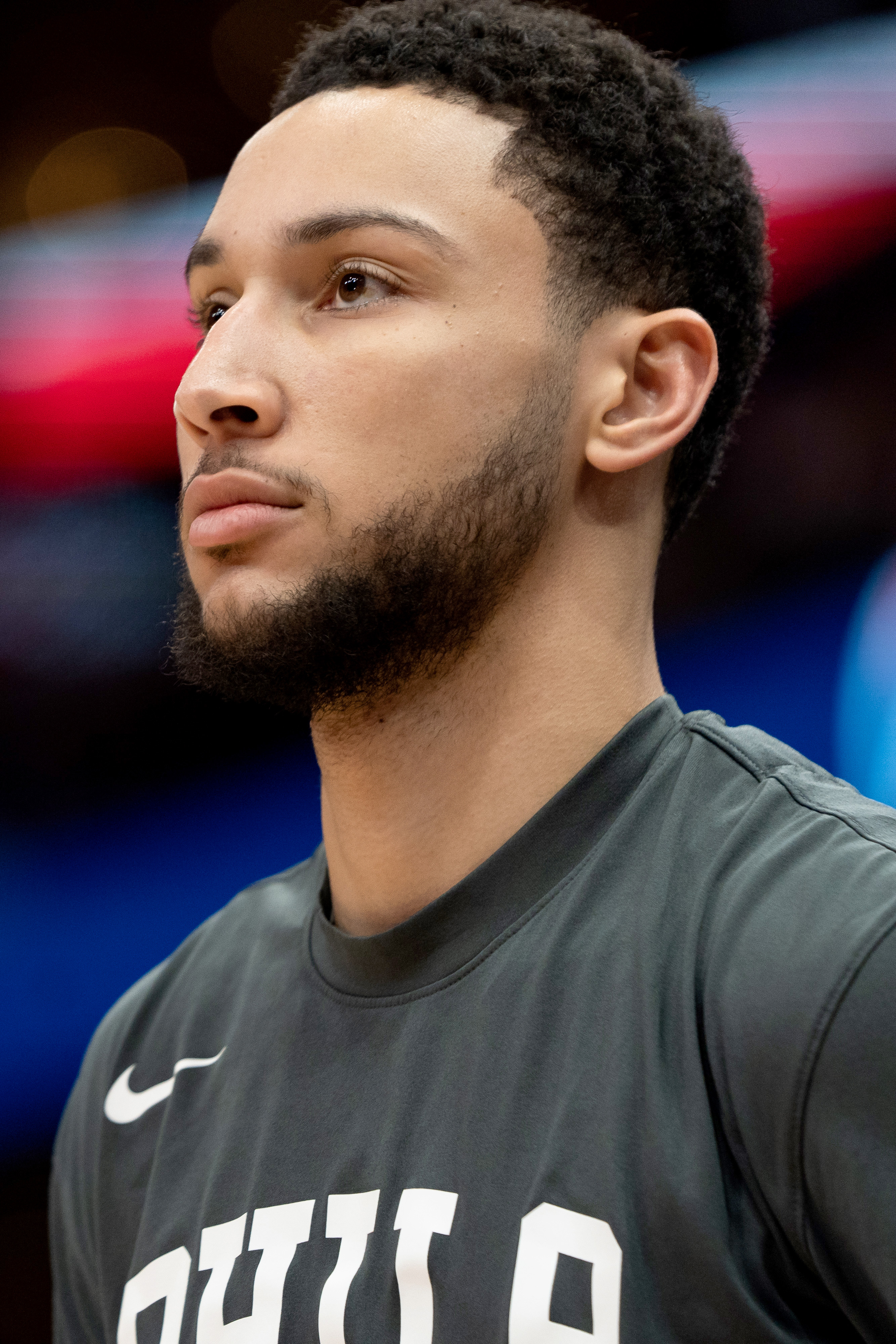
Ben Simmons has been a victim of the Hack-a-Shaq strategy.

On November 29, 2017, the Washington Wizards used what a newspaper called the "hack-a-Ben Simmons strategy" when trailing the Philadelphia 76ers by 24 points in the third quarter. The Wizards repeatedly fouled point guard Ben Simmons, forcing him to shoot 29 free throws, 24 of them in the fourth quarter. Simmons was a notoriously bad shooter and had entered the game with a 56% free throw rate, which were worse in this game, making 15 out of 29 attempted (52%). However, the 76ers held on to win the game, 118–113. Simmons' 31 points were a career high for him at the time.

On May 31, 2021, the Wizards again used the same strategy in game four of the 2021 NBA playoffs, intentionally fouling Simmons three times late in the fourth quarter and sending Simmons to the foul line. Simmons would only make 3 of 6 attempts in a 122–114 loss to the Wizards, finishing with 5 makes out of 11 attempts made at the end of the game. On June 16, 2021, the Atlanta Hawks adopted the strategy in game five of the 2021 playoffs, intentionally fouling Simmons in second and fourth quarters and sending him to the line in a 109–106 loss to the Hawks. Simmons finished with 4 makes out of 14 attempts made at the end of the game.

=== Dereck Lively II ===
On May 11, 2024, the Thunder employed this strategy against Mavericks center Dereck Lively II in Game 3 of their round 2 series. Lively, a 50% free throw shooter, finished with 8 makes out of 12 attempts from the line in the Mavericks' 105–101 win over the Thunder.

=== Steven Adams ===
Steven Adams was known for his poor free throw shooting, with a career percentage of only 53%. On May 2, 2025, the Golden State Warriors applied this strategy in a pivotal Game 6 against the Rockets, intentionally fouling Adams repeatedly throughout the second half of the game as they trailed. Adams was awarded 16 free throw attempts in total, of which he made 9. The Rockets ultimately won 115–107.

=== Mitchell Robinson ===
During the 2025 NBA Playoffs, the Boston Celtics made continued use of fouling New York Knicks center Mitchell Robinson during the two sides' meeting in the Eastern Conference Semifinals. Robinson, a career 52% free throw shooter, was known for his defensive and rebounding output as a longtime Knicks center. Boston fouled Robinson before the two-minute mark of each period to slow down the game, especially with starting center Karl-Anthony Towns getting in foul trouble early on. To date, the strategy has peaked in Game 3 of the series, when Boston sent Robinson to the line 12 times, with Robinson hitting just four of the attempts. The Celtics continued to engage in the gambit despite gaining a lead that reached as high as 31.

During the 2026 Eastern Conference Semifinals, the Philadelphia 76ers attempted to "Hack-a-Mitch," using Justin Edwards to draw fouls on Robinson, who was shooting 40.8 percent from the free throw line.

== Criticism and rule changes ==
Detractors argue that deliberate fouling makes the game unpleasant to watch, violates the spirit or disrupts the rhythm of the game, puts the fouling team too quickly into the bonus situation, and disparages the team's defensive abilities.

All that did was allow us to set our defense. I think that's disrespectful to their players. Basically, they were telling their players that they couldn't guard us.

— Pistons forward Tayshaun Prince after Los Angeles Clippers coach Mike Dunleavy used the Hack-a-Shaq strategy against Pistons center Ben Wallace in December 2005

Many coaches have heeded these criticisms and doubted the effectiveness of the strategy in minimizing scoring, questioning the effect of the strategy on the psychology of the player fouled deliberately on the belief that he will not make his free throws, with some believing that frequently sending O'Neal to the foul line risked putting him "into a rhythm" and temporarily making him a better shooter.

These factors, coupled with the fact that only a handful of players satisfy the criteria for Hack-a-Shaq, mean the strategy is uncommon in the NBA. A rule change starting in the 2016–17 NBA season put an additional constraint on deliberate fouling; off-the-ball fouls now award the fouled team a free throw and possession of the ball in the final 2 minutes of each quarter, extended from the prior rule affecting only the final 2 minutes of the 4th quarter.
