= Ejection (sports) =

Removal of a participant due to a violation of the rules

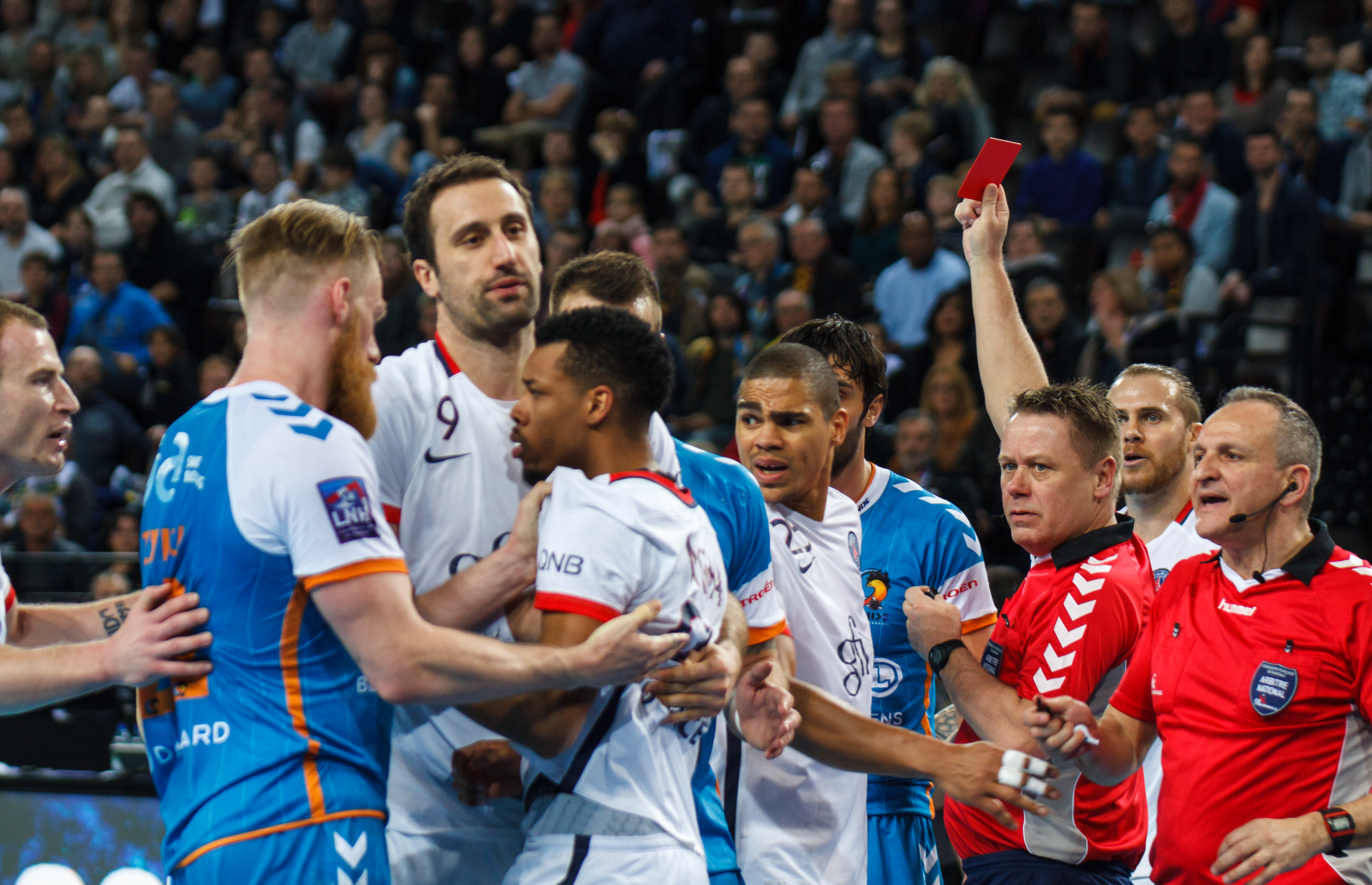
A French team handball player being ejected from a match, signaled by the red card held aloft by the referee

In sports, an ejection (also known as dismissal, sending-off, disqualification, or early shower) is the removal of a participant from a contest due to a violation of the sport's rules. The exact violations that lead to an ejection vary depending upon the sport, but common causes for ejection include unsportsmanlike conduct, violent acts against another participant that are beyond the sport's generally accepted standards for such acts, abuse against officials, violations of the sport's rules that the contest official deems to be egregious, or the use of an illegal substance to better a player's game. Most sports have provisions that allow players to be ejected, and many allow for the ejection of coaches, managers, or other non-playing personnel. In sports that use penalty cards, a red card is often used to signal dismissals. In some sports, another player is permitted to enter the game in place of the player who has been ejected, but in others the team is required to continue the game with a reduced number of players.

The decision to eject a participant usually lies with one or more officials present at the contest (e.g. referees or umpires). In addition to removal from the contest, many sports leagues provide additional sanctions against participants who have been ejected, such as monetary fines or suspensions from future contests.

When the offender is ejected, they must leave the immediate playing area; in most cases, this means going to the locker room or other part of the venue out of sight of the playing area, or in extreme cases, leaving the facility grounds. In many youth sports leagues, ejected players are required to stay with their coach in the team area, or at least be supervised by an adult at whatever location the player is required to go. If a participant refuses to cooperate with an ejection, additional sanctions may be levied, such as forfeiture of the contest, monetary fines, or suspensions. Rarely, outside actions and sanctions from law enforcement authorities may be required.

== Conditions ==
=== Basketball ===
In the National Basketball Association (NBA) and most other basketball games, a player or coach is ejected from the game if he accumulates two technical fouls of an unsportsmanlike nature or "type 1" flagrant fouls over the course of the game. Participants who commit a "type 2" flagrant foul or intentionally enter the stands are ejected summarily regardless of the number of technical fouls accumulated. Ejected players/coaches must leave the court area for the remainder of play, and must do so immediately, or else risk even heavier fines/suspensions. In the NBA, an ejection will result in, at minimum, a $1,000 fine; an ejection for leaving the bench during a fight carries at least a one-game suspension as well. In domestic games, refusing to leave after being ejected can result in a player being put on report. If being put on report does not provide enough encouragement for a player to leave the court, the official may award the game to the opposing team, regardless of score. Players who incur 16 technical fouls in a single NBA season are automatically suspended for one game; an additional suspension is imposed for each increment of two thereafter. Should a player receive the 16th technical foul in the last regular-season game, he will be suspended for the first game in the next season, unless if his team is in the playoffs, when he will be suspended for the first playoff game. In the playoffs, players are suspended if they receive seven technical fouls.

A significant rule change was made in 1981 whereby the NBA eliminated the ejection of a coach for three technical fouls caused by an illegal defense. Also, in the NBA, ejections and suspensions are not permissible if a technical foul is caused by an excessive timeout, delay of game, accidental departure from the coach's box, the destruction of a backboard caused by a play (such as a slam dunk), defensive hanging on any part of the basket unit to successfully touch a ball (Rule 12), or any remaining in the game after six fouls when a team is out of players because of fouls, injuries, and ejections under Rule 3, Section I, paragraph b. These technical fouls are referenced in the NBA rule book as "non-unsportsmanlike conduct technical fouls".

In games sanctioned by the International Basketball Federation (FIBA), a player is ejected for two technicals (since October 1, 2014), unsportsmanlike fouls or one disqualifying foul. Technical fouls in FIBA include swinging of elbows without contact and flopping, which are not fouls in the NBA. A coach can be ejected upon having incurred two coach technical fouls, or a combination of three bench and coach technical fouls. There is no separation regarding a "non-unsportsmanlike conduct technical foul", as in the NBA, so two delay-of-game violations result in an ejection.

In NFHS contests, ejected players must remain on the team bench, so that they may continue to be supervised by a coach or other adult team representative. If an adult team representative other than the head coach, such as an adult assistant coach, can provide supervision from the court and to the locker room for the duration of the contest, the player may leave the visual confines of the playing area with this representative.

In National Collegiate Athletic Association (NCAA) contests, ejected players are dismissed to the locker room.

In all cases and leagues, any requirement for an ejected player to remain on-site may be waived if the incident resulting in ejection requires intervention from law enforcement, such as where the ejected player has grievously assaulted a player, official, coach or spectator with purposeful intent.

==== Disqualification ====
Basketball also features disqualification, also known as fouling out. A player who commits a certain number of personal fouls in a game (five or six in most leagues), is removed from the game and is said to have "fouled out". Unlike ejection, disqualification is not considered a punitive action but rather a natural consequence of a very physical sport with many instances of contact. Disqualified players are permitted to remain on the bench with the team (instead of being sent to the locker room, as with an ejected player) and are not subject to any further penalties (such as fines or suspensions); they can resume play in their next game. The NBA all-time leader in disqualifications is Vern Mikkelsen, who was disqualified 127 times in 631 games. In the NBA, a technical foul (which does not count towards suspension or ejection) is also assessed for re-entering a game after fouling out of a game in emergency situations listed in Rule 3, Section I when a team is reduced to five players. Once that occurs, a technical foul is charged if a player remains in the game after his sixth or subsequent foul, or as the last player to foul out, re-enters the game in case of injury to an eligible player that must be removed.

=== Baseball ===
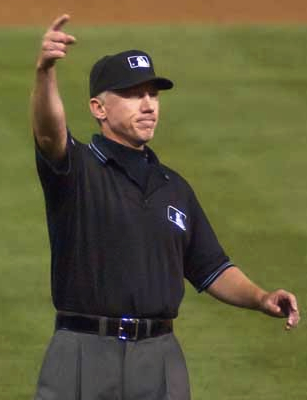
Baseball umpire Lance Barksdale signalling an ejection

In baseball, each umpire has a considerable amount of discretion, and may eject any player, coach, or manager solely on his own judgment of unsportsmanlike conduct. The ejectable offense may be an excessively heated or offensive argument with an umpire, offensive interference (contact with the catcher on a play at the plate), malicious game play (especially pitchers attempting to intentionally strike batters with the ball or a manager or coach ordering a pitcher to do so), illegally applying a foreign substance to a bat or otherwise tampering with a ball, using a corked bat, charging the mound, or otherwise fighting. Between players and umpires, there is a common understanding that a certain level of argument is permitted, but players who too vigorously question an umpire's judgment of balls and strikes, argue a balk or use foul language may risk an ejection. A player is also automatically ejected when a bat, glove, cap or helmet is taken off and thrown down in anger or confusion.

Persons other than players, coaches and managers, such as spectators, ballpark staff, mascots, or members of the media, may be ejected at an umpire's discretion. Depending on the circumstances, spectators who are ejected may also face arrest and prosecution. Bat boys and ball boys may be ejected for not wearing proper safety equipment.

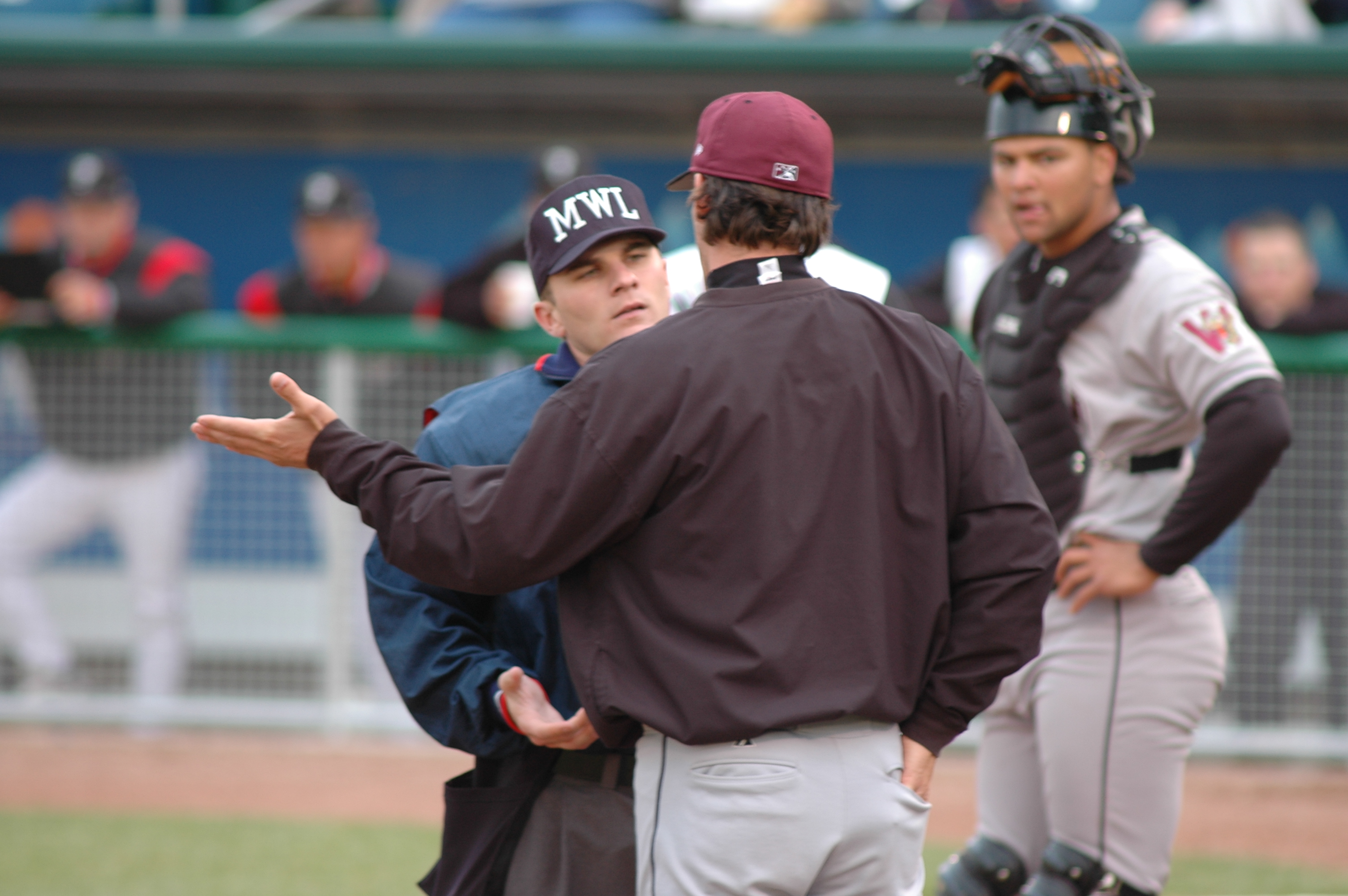
Despite having been ejected, the manager of the Wisconsin Timber Rattlers continues to argue with the umpire.

In some cases, an ejection is followed by a fine or a suspension by the league if the player, or manager or coach, reacts in a very hostile manner towards the umpire. Also, any ejection for malicious game play will normally result in a suspension. Some managers will engage in arguments with umpires specifically to provoke an ejection, in hopes of inspiring a rally from their team. Former Atlanta Braves manager Bobby Cox holds the Major League Baseball (MLB) record for most times ejected with 161, while Hall of Fame umpire Bill Klem holds the record for most ejections issued by an umpire with 251.

Baseball has a rich vocabulary for describing ejections: a player or coach may also be "run", "thrown out", "banned", "given the ol' heave-ho", "sent to the clubhouse", "hit the showers", "tossed", "kicked out", "dumped", "sent off", "pitched", "bounced out", "canned", "chucked", or "booted". The umpire can signal an ejection by pointing to the dugout or waving his arm toward the dugout in a “throwing” motion, usually yelling at the ejected person to leave. Fans of a home team usually cheer when a player from the visiting team is ejected. Managers or other players usually come out of the dugout and push the offending player away so as to keep them from getting into more trouble with the umpire. Managers often are simultaneously ejected when attempting to protect a player or otherwise leaving the dugout during play. Once an ejection is called, the ejected person and other associated people usually continue yelling at the umpire, with more anger. This is colloquially known as “getting your money’s worth"—a reference to the automatic fine levied by most leagues (especially at the professional level) for getting ejected from a game.

=== American football ===
Any player or team official who commits a personal foul (i.e., striking, kicking, kneeing) or act of unnecessary roughness against another player or team official, an act of unsportsmanlike conduct, or a palpably unfair act is liable to be disqualified from further participation if the referee is of the opinion that the act is flagrant. Any player or team official who fights with another player or team official, leaves the bench to take part in a fight, intentionally makes contact with or assaults a game official, or uses any item of equipment as a weapon is automatically disqualified.

If a player or team official is disqualified, their team is assessed a fifteen-yard penalty, but if a player or team official has been disqualified for a palpably unfair act, the distance or score penalty will be determined by the referee after consultation with the other officials.

Compared to other American sports (perhaps with the exception of basketball), ejections in American football are relatively uncommon considering the physical nature of the sport.

==== Professional football ====
The North American National Football League (NFL) made an experimental rule change on March 23, 2016, for the following season stating that two unsportsmanlike conduct penalties on a player would result in an automatic ejection from the game. Some coaches have expressed concern that this could result in a player with one such penalty being goaded by the opposing team into a second penalty to get them removed from the game.

From the 2018 season, players who commit helmet-to-helmet contact are automatically ejected if these are deemed to be flagrant.

==== College football ====
Per National Collegiate Athletic Association (NCAA) rules, a player is automatically disqualified if they are determined to have led with the crown of their helmet and/or targeted a defenseless player's head or neck area. In addition, if the offence is committed in the second half of a game, the player is suspended for the first half of the following game.

==== High school football ====
Rules of the National Federation of State High School Associations (NFHS) state any player or team official that receives two unsportsmanlike conduct penalties in the same game is automatically disqualified.

=== Association football ===
In association football, a player is dismissed from the field of play by the referee showing them a red card if they commit a dismissible offence or the player has committed a cautionable (yellow card) offence having already received a yellow card in the same game. The act of ejection is referred to in the sport as "sending off". A difference between being sent off in association football and the above-mentioned sports is that in association football a player may not be replaced, forcing their team to play a member down for the remainder of the match. Additionally, a dismissal in any professional league results in an automatic suspension of at least one match.

It is also possible for the manager or other team official to be "ordered off" (often referred to as being "sent to the stands"), which requires them to leave their technical area and sit in the stands away from the touch line. This usually requires another member of the coaching staff to make decisions for the team, such as substitutes and formation. Also, depending upon the rules of the association presiding over the game, the manager or team official may not be allowed on the bench or to communicate with assistants for at least their team's next game.

As the Laws of the Game state that a team cannot play with fewer than seven players, the dismissal of five or more players from one team will result in the match being abandoned. The officials will then file a game report with the appropriate league or association, which then decides the final score of record.

According to the Guinness Book of World Records, the most red cards administered in one game is 20, for a match between Paraguayan teams Sportivo Ameliano and General Caballero in 1993. A protest over two red cards broke down into a generalized brawl that lasted over ten minutes, forcing the referee to abandon the match after the additional dismissals.

=== Rugby football ===
In all codes of rugby football, a player may be temporarily suspended for a period of the match. In rugby union and rugby league, the standard suspension period is 10 minutes (out of an 80-minute game). This can be referred to either as a sin bin or as a yellow card. In the National Rugby League (NRL), referees signal a sin bin by raising both hands with all ten fingers outstretched; in other rugby league and rugby union competitions, a system of yellow and red cards may be used.

Temporary suspensions are usually given for repeated infringements (by either the same player or team), professional fouls and foul play, such as high tackles. A player cannot be replaced while temporarily suspended, though may be at the conclusion of the suspension period. For more serious offences or a second infraction warranting a sin bin, a player may be sent off. This can be represented with the use of a red card; in the NRL, the referee simply points to the touch line, with no card used. Depending on the competition and the circumstances, a sending-off may last for the rest of the game, with no replacement allowed, or a replacement may be allowed after 20 minutes of game time, known as a "20-minute red card" and signalled by the referee crossing their arms after holding up the red card.

Special conditions exist in rugby union for the replacement of a sinbinned or sent-off front-row forward.

In rugby union sevens, which normally lasts 14 minutes (20 in finals), the suspension period is 2 minutes. While eight minutes shorter than in fifteens, suspensions are more severe in sevens as one seventh of the team is out for one seventh of the match; this opens up more space than losing one fifteenth of the team for one eighth of the match.

Referees also have the power to send team officials to the stands, similar to that in association football.

=== Cricket ===
Prior to 2017, there was no provision in the Laws for a player to be ejected, although post-game disciplinary action could occur. There was, in keeping with the spirit of the game, provision in the Laws (Law 41, Law 42 prior to 2017) for umpires to eject a bowler from their team's bowling attack in the remainder of the team's innings, detailed below.

The Laws of Cricket 2017 Code introduced a new Law (Law 42) dealing with players' conduct, as it was widely accepted that a need existed to provide the umpires with on-field sanctions for poor conduct, and that such sanction could lead to sending off for acts of violence.

Under the new Law, four different levels of offences were created: a Level 3 offence (intimidating an umpire by language or gesture, or threatening to assault a player or any other person except an umpire) results in the offending player being suspended for a number of overs dependent on the length of the match, while a Level 4 offence (threatening to assault or making inappropriate or deliberate physical contact with an umpire, physically assaulting a player or any other person, or committing any other act of violence) results in the offending player being removed from the field for the remainder of the match.

In circumstances where a players' conduct offence of any level has been committed, the umpires will halt the game, summon the offending player's captain to the field, inform the captain of the breach of Law and the associated penalty. In the event of a Level 3 or Level 4 offence, they will instruct the captain to remove the offending player from the field; if the offending player's captain refuses to comply with an instruction to remove a player, the umpires will award the match to the opposition, or if both captains are involved and refuse to comply, abandon the match.

Furthermore, any player conduct offence will result in a report to the Executive of the offending player's team and to the Governing Body responsible for the match who (as was the case in the prior Laws) may take additional disciplinary action after the match.

==== Bowlers ====
Additionally, the umpires have the power to eject a bowler from the team's bowling attack for the remainder of the innings (in the case of a one-innings match or the second innings of a two-innings match, the remainder of the match) if the bowler, after having received one or two prior warnings (depending on prior offences), is guilty of throwing (law 21.3), ball-tampering (law 41.3), dangerous and unfair bowling (laws 41.6), time wasting (law 41.9) or running onto the protected area of the pitch (law 41.13). Any bowler who is guilty of deliberately bowling a high full-pitched ball (law 41.7) or deliberately bowling a front foot no-ball (law 41.8) is automatically ejected.

If a bowler is ejected, the umpires will direct the captain of the fielding team, once the ball is dead, to take the bowler off forthwith. If there is an over in progress when the bowler is ejected, it shall be completed by another bowler who shall neither have bowled the previous over nor be allowed to bowl the next over. The bowler thus ejected shall not bowl again in that innings, or again in the match if they have been ejected for ball-tampering.

=== Ice hockey ===
In ice hockey, there are several types of ejections for penalties: game ejection, game misconduct penalty, match penalty, and gross misconduct penalty. Some hockey leagues may only use some of these.

A game ejection is issued during games sanctioned by Hockey Canada for three stick-infraction penalties or three head-contact penalties. The stick-infraction penalties include cross checking, high sticking, butt ending, slashing, and spearing. The head-contact penalties include deliberate contact with an opponent's head, and hits on vulnerable players.

A game misconduct penalty is usually issued against a player for unsportsmanlike play, escalating a fight, or leaving the penalty box before he has completed serving time for another penalty, although some major penalties carry an automatic game misconduct. If a player incurs three game misconducts in a season, they will be given a one-match ban. The player must leave the ice immediately, and a substitute may take over. However, if any other penalties are incurred by the ejected player in the same incident, they must be served in the penalty box by the substituting player. By the USA Hockey rules, a player can receive a game misconduct for violently checking an opponent into the boards from behind, or if the opponent's head strikes the boards or the goal frame as a result of the check from behind. It is also common for a player to receive a game misconduct, regardless of the force of the hit, the second time (s)he checks an opponent from behind. A referee signals a misconduct penalty by tapping his hands on his hips several times.

A match penalty is usually issued against a player for deliberately attempting to injure another player, such as stomping on him with their skate or a malicious hit. In addition to the offending player being immediately ejected (and usually subject to suspension), another player must serve a five-minute major penalty in the penalty box in addition to any other penalties imposed. The only exception is if a match penalty is against a goaltender, in which case the replacement goaltender can enter the ice immediately and a non-goaltender player serves the penalties. Match penalties may also be automatically flagged for review and supplementary discipline, depending on the league or association. A referee signals a match penalty by patting the flat part of his hand on the top of his head.

A gross misconduct penalty is issued for an action far outside the normal level of acceptable behavior; for example, when a player has "made a travesty of the game". The National Hockey League (NHL) removed the penalty from its rule book following the 2006–07 season. Other leagues continue to use the penalty; the Greater Toronto Hockey League (GTHL) issues them in instances of racist language.

=== Water polo ===
An ejection is called for a hold, sink, or pullback by a defensive player, on an opponent without active control of the ball. Their team must play with one fewer defender until 20 seconds have elapsed or there is a change of possession, after which the ejected player or a substitute can reenter the game. These 6 vs 5 situations are often called "man up", "man down", or a "power play". Should any player acquire 3 personal fouls (penalties/ejections) the player must sit out for the remainder the game. If a player commits a foul within 5 meters of the goal that prevents a probable goal, the offense will be awarded a penalty shot. Ejections and penalties are also incurred due to interference of a play. For example, if an ordinary foul is called (one blast of whistle) and the defensive player does not disengage, an ejection can be incurred. If an ejected player fails to promptly make their way to the penalty box, the offensive team will be awarded a penalty shot.

A misconduct foul can be incurred for unacceptable language or disrespect, violence, persistent fouls, or taking part in the game after being excluded. Players in the water that acquire a misconduct foul (shown by circular hand motions by the referee) must sit out for the remainder of the game. Coaches and players on the bench may be removed by being awarded a red card.

A brutality, the most serious foul, occurs when a player strikes an opponent or official with malicious intent. The offending player is removed for the remainder of the game, and their team plays with one fewer player for a full 4 minutes. The player must also face further consequences according to their respective rulebook (NCAA, FINA, NFHS, etc.), usually involving a suspension from subsequent games. The severity of the penalty makes brutalities a very rare occurrence.

=== Field lacrosse ===
In field lacrosse, an ejection (expulsion foul) is issued for a severe penalty, such as fighting, leaving the bench to take part in a fight, malicious hits, deliberately attempting to injure another player, blatant fouls at the end of or immediately following a game, or, in high school, receiving two unreleasable unsportsmanlike conduct penalties. Coaches and team officials can also be ejected for being caught using alcohol or tobacco during a game.

The team guilty of the expulsion foul must serve a three-minute non-releasable penalty, and the ejected player/coach/official is suspended for at least the next game.

Like in basketball, field lacrosse also has disqualification or "fouling out". This occurs if a player incurs five minutes of personal foul penalty time in a game (i.e. slashing, illegal body check, tripping, unnecessary roughness, unsportsmanlike conduct, punishable by a one to three minute penalty). In youth lacrosse, three personal fouls (regardless of length) will also result in disqualification. Upon completion or release of the penalty that caused the disqualification, a substitute can enter the field in the player's place. A disqualified player suffers no further sanction and is able to resume in the team's next game.

Technical fouls do not count towards the five minutes; however a player may be called for unsportsmanlike conduct if they repeatedly commit the same technical foul, in which case it would count toward disqualification.

=== Motorsport ===
Officials have authority to penalize and, if need be, disqualify participants. This is typically assessed on the entry in the race itself, and often signaled with a black flag being shown to the offender. Reasons include for safety (a car excessively damaged or unable to maintain a safe speed relative to others) or conduct (unsafe driving from blocking a faster car unsafely to intentionally wrecking another, or purposefully driving in the reverse direction outside victory laps to cause a head-on collision). Racing leagues may also assess other penalties, whether a fine, a loss of championship points or standing, or even suspension for several events, with revocation of the driver's racing licence or ability to drive by the sanctioning body often the most severe form of punishment.

In NASCAR-sanctioned competitions, officials may eject crew members for vehicle infractions and both drivers and crew for disciplinary reasons. Crew members may also be ejected during vehicle inspection primarily with the Optical Scanning System but with other techniques before practice, qualifying, or the race, with the severity of the penalty is based on when the infraction occurs. If the infraction occurs where the parc fermé situation has qualifying one day, then the cars are locked in parc fermé afterwards until inspection and the race the next day, the first inspection failure means the car loses its qualifying time, and if necessary, removed from the event and the highest-placed non-qualifier, should they pass inspection, be reinstated. If the infraction occurs during inspection during any situation (before or after practice or qualifying, or before the race, regardless of parc fermé situations) and the car fails twice, one of the team's mechanics is ejected from the event. Three failures and the car will have to also be penalised with a 15-minute penalty from practice the ensuing race, or in pre-race situations, a pass-through pit lane on the opening lap, and four times will instigate a ten-point penalty.

== Additional penalties ==
In some instances, a player or coach who is ejected must serve a suspension and may pay a fine. Often, the suspension is one game for the first offense, with harsher penalties depending on subsequent ejections and the severity of the offense. Sometimes in professional sports, a fine may be sanctioned against a player or coach.

Most NFHS contests require ejected players to remain in the team area, so they may be supervised by a responsible team adult, usually the head or assistant coach (as requiring a minor to leave an area unsupervised can lead to legal liabilities). If the player continues to be unruly, other solutions may be implemented such as requiring an assistant coach to leave the area with the player, handing the player over to the school administrator on duty, requiring the player's parents/legal guardians to take the player home, or more rarely, if the ejected player becomes violent, law enforcement to take them into custody.

== See also ==
- Penalty card
- Walk of shame
- Match penalty
