= Free throw =

Penalty in basketball

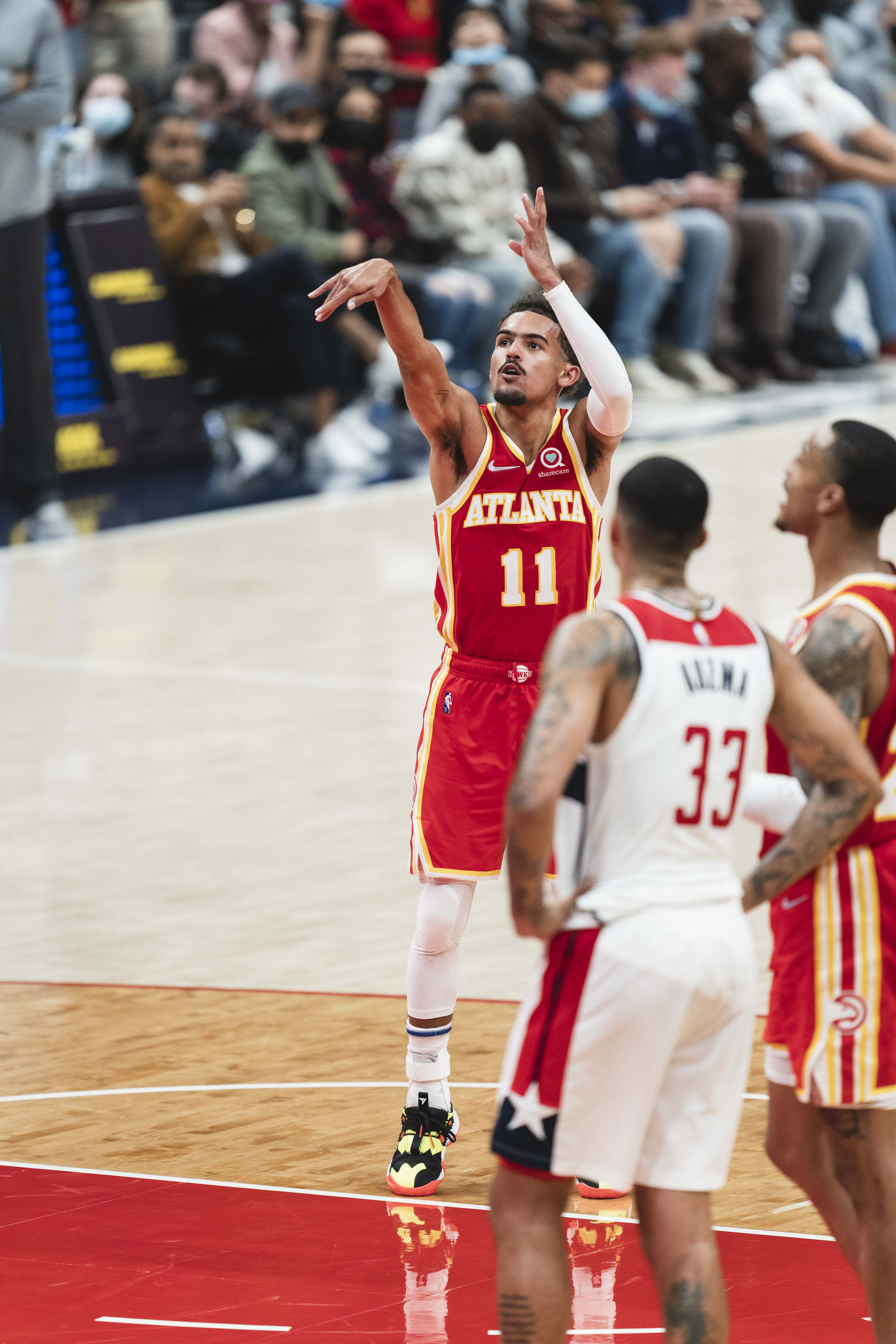
Trae Young of the Atlanta Hawks shoots a free throw during a game vs the Washington Wizards.

In basketball, free throws or foul shots are unopposed attempts to score points by shooting from behind the free-throw line (informally known as the foul line or the charity stripe), a line situated at the end of the restricted area. Free throws are generally awarded after a foul on the shooter by the opposing team, analogous to penalty shots in other team sports. Free throws are also awarded in other situations, including technical fouls, and when the fouling team has entered the bonus/penalty situation (after a team commits a requisite number of fouls, each subsequent foul results in free throws regardless of the type of foul committed). Also, depending on the situation, a player may be awarded between one and three free throws. Each successful free throw is worth one point.

== Description ==
In the NBA, most players make 70–80% of their attempts. The league's best shooters (such as Mark Price, Steve Nash, Steve Kerr, Rick Barry, Larry Bird, Ray Allen, José Calderón, Stephen Curry, Reggie Miller, Kevin Durant, and Dirk Nowitzki) can make roughly 90% of their attempts over a season, while notoriously poor shooters (e.g. Dwight Howard, DeAndre Jordan, Wilt Chamberlain, Andre Drummond, Andris Biedrins, Chris Dudley, Ben Wallace, Shaquille O'Neal, Ben Simmons, and Dennis Rodman) may struggle to make 50% of them. During a foul shot, a player's feet must both be completely behind the foul line.

== Awarding free throws ==
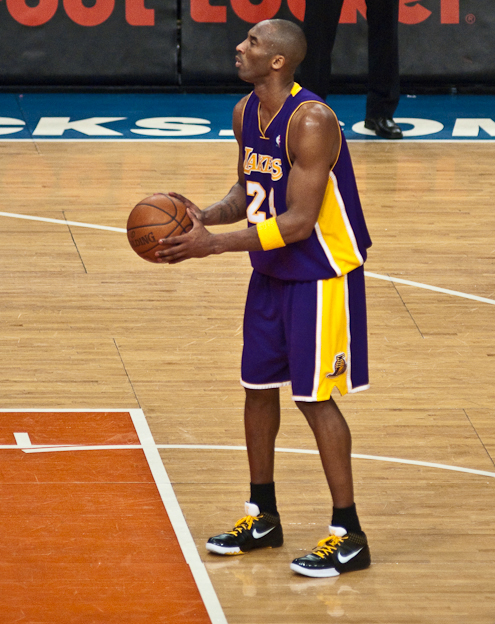
Kobe Bryant, Los Angeles Lakers Hall of Famer, sets and attempts a free-throw

There are many situations when free throws can be awarded.

The first and most common is when a player is fouled while in the act of shooting. If the player misses the shot during the foul, the player receives either two or three free throws depending on whether the shot was taken in front of or behind the three-point line. If, despite the foul, the player still makes the attempted shot, the number of free throws is reduced to one, and the basket counts. This is known as a three-point or four-point play, depending on the value of the made basket. "And-One" is also a popular term for this type of free throw.

The second is when the fouling team is in the team bonus (or foul penalty) situation. This happens when, in a single period, a team commits a set number of fouls whether or not in the act of shooting. In FIBA, (W)NBA and NCAA women's play, the limit is four fouls per quarter; in the NBA, starting with the fifth foul (fourth in overtime), or the second in the final 2 minutes if the team has less than 5 fouls (4 in OT), the opposing team gets two free throws. The WNBA follows the NBA's rules regarding reset of the team foul count in the final 2 minutes of any period (including overtime). In FIBA and NCAA women's basketball, the fouled player also shoots two free throws starting with the opponent's fifth foul in a period, considering that team fouls accrue from the fourth period on, as all overtimes are extensions of it for purposes of accrued team fouls. In NCAA men's basketball, beginning with the seventh foul of the half, one free throw is awarded; if the player makes the free throw, another is given. This is called shooting a "one-and-one". Starting with the tenth foul of the half, two free throws are awarded. In addition, overtime is considered an extension of the second half for purposes of accumulated team fouls. Free throws are not awarded for offensive fouls (most often charging fouls), even if the team fouled is in the bonus. The number of fouls that triggers a penalty is higher in college men's basketball because the game is divided into two 20-minute halves, as opposed to quarters of 12 minutes in the NBA or 10 minutes in the WNBA, college women's basketball, or FIBA play (the college women's game was played in 20-minute halves before 2015–16). As in professional play, a foul in the act of shooting is a two- or three-shot foul, depending on the value of the shot attempt, with one free throw being awarded if the shot is good.

Free throws are normally taken by the fouled player. If a player is injured upon being fouled and cannot shoot free throws; in college, the opposing team's coach may designate any player in the game at the time of the foul to shoot free throws in the place of the injured player; in the NBA, the opposing team designates the player to shoot, and the injured player cannot return unless the foul committed was a flagrant-2, in which case the player's own team also gets to pick the replacement shooter. The opposing team chooses a replacement shooter if the player fouled is ejected (such as participating in a fight) before taking their free throws.

If a player, coach, or team staff (e.g., doctor, statistician) shows poor sportsmanship, which may include arguing with a referee, or commits a technical violation (delay of game, excessive time outs, or when a team has no eligible players remaining after a player has fouled out or subsequently the last player to foul out must re-enter the game, the latter two are NBA rules) that person may get charged with a more serious foul called a technical foul. In the NBA and in FIBA, a technical foul results in one free-throw attempt for the other team. Under NCAA rules, technical fouls are divided into "Class A" (violent or serious unsportsmanlike conduct) and "Class B" (less egregious violations such as hanging on the rim or delay of game). Class A technicals result in two free throws, and Class B technicals result in one. At all levels, the opposing team may choose any player who is currently on the court to shoot the free throws and is then awarded possession of the ball after the free throws. Since there is no opportunity for a rebound, these free throws are shot with no players on the lane.

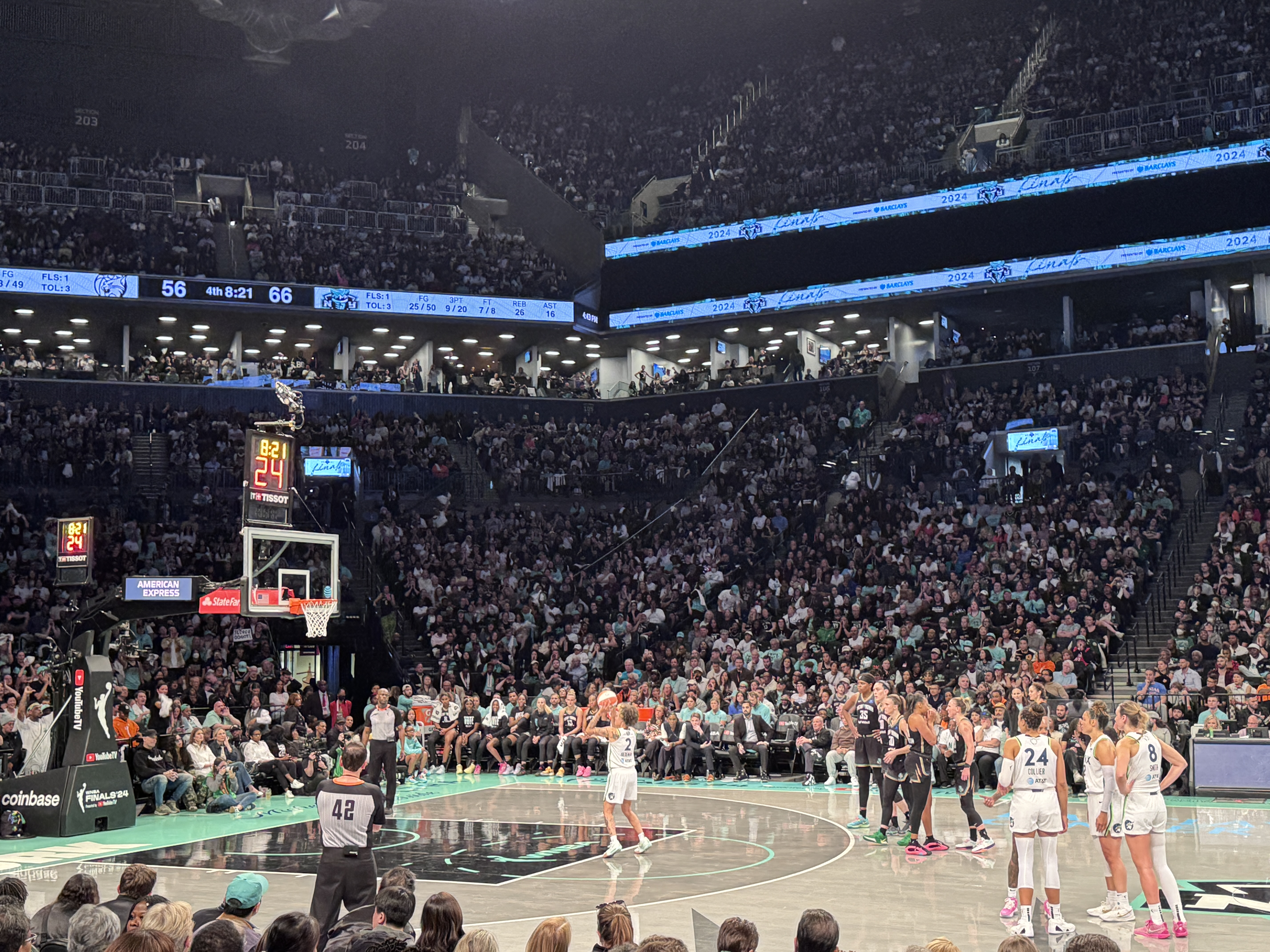
Natisha Heideman shooting free throws after a "reckless closeout" flagrant foul by Courtney Vandersloot in Game 2 of the 2024 WNBA Finals. Note, both teams wait for the ball behind the shooter and away from the baseline because of the escalated nature of the foul.

Finally, if a referee deems a foul extremely aggressive, or that it did not show an attempt to play the ball, the referee can call an even more severe foul, known as an "unsportsmanlike foul" in international and NCAA women's play or a "flagrant foul" in the (W)NBA and NCAA men's basketball. This foul is charged against the player (who, depending on the severity of the offense, can even be ejected), and the opponent gets two free throws and possession of the ball afterward. Unlike technical fouls, the player fouled must shoot the awarded free throws.

Fouls "away from the ball" (fouls that do not occur on the shooter or near the ball) are handled like the second case above in most situations. Many times defenders hold their opponent to prevent them from catching an in-bound pass or fight through screens and thus are called for fouls. These fouls are almost always treated as normal personal fouls. In the (W)NBA, when there are only two minutes left on the clock of either half, off-ball fouls when the fouling team is over the limit are rewarded with one free throw and possession of the ball. It is therefore common for a losing team to deliberately single out its opponent's poor free-throw shooters, regardless of their dominance in other aspects of the game (as in the cases of Ben Wallace, Shaquille O'Neal and Dwight Howard ), as the targets of deliberate fouls until the two-minute mark, after which the losing team plays intense defense for the rest of the game; this strategy is known as the "Hack-a-Shaq". It is believed that this rule was instituted because of Wilt Chamberlain. Previously, teams had been allowed to foul any player on the court regardless of whether that player had possession of the ball, with only two free throws awarded to the fouled player. This motivated teams to chase poor free-throw shooters, such as Chamberlain, around the court in an attempt to foul him in an effort to extend the game. To discourage this practice, the NBA changed the rule to award one free throw and possession of the ball to a player who has fouled away from the ball in the last two minutes of the fourth quarter. This rule does not apply in international or NCAA play and in fact, plays a very vital strategic role in the NCAA Tournament.

Effective in October 2022, FIBA established a new category of personal foul that it calls a "throw-in foul". This category only applies in the last 2 minutes of any period (quarter or overtime). Any personal foul by the defense on an offensive player while the ball is out of bounds and either in the hands of the referee or at the disposal of the player taking the throw-in results in 1 free throw and possession.

3x3, FIBA's version of the half-court three-on-three game, has its own unique free-throw rules.

- No free throws are awarded for the first 6 team fouls during a game (regulation 3x3 games are played in a single period). Exceptions are shooting fouls, technical fouls, and unsportsmanlike and disqualifying fouls.
- In standard free-throw shooting situations, only one free throw is awarded. This matches normal scoring, in which baskets inside the "three-point" arc are worth 1 point and those from outside the arc are worth 2 points.
- A player fouled on a missed basket attempt normally receives a number of free throws equal to the value of the attempted shot (either 1 or 2).
- A player fouled on a made basket normally receives one free throw.
- A team enters the bonus once its opponent has committed its seventh foul of the game. On team fouls 7, 8, and 9, the fouled player receives two free throws. Starting with the 10th team foul, the fouled player receives two free throws and the non-offending team receives possession of the ball. This supersedes the standard rule for shooting fouls (whether the basket was made or missed).
- Technical fouls result in one free throw for the non-offending team, and add 1 to the offending team's foul count. No additional free throws are awarded.
- Unsportsmanlike fouls result in two free throws. Disqualifying fouls, including a player's second unsportsmanlike foul (which automatically results in ejection), result in two free throws and possession. Both types add 2 fouls to the team foul count, but no additional free throws are awarded.
- As in standard full-court rules, offensive fouls never result in free throws.
- Double fouls never result in free throws, even if one or both of the fouls are unsportsmanlike or disqualifying.

== Procedure ==
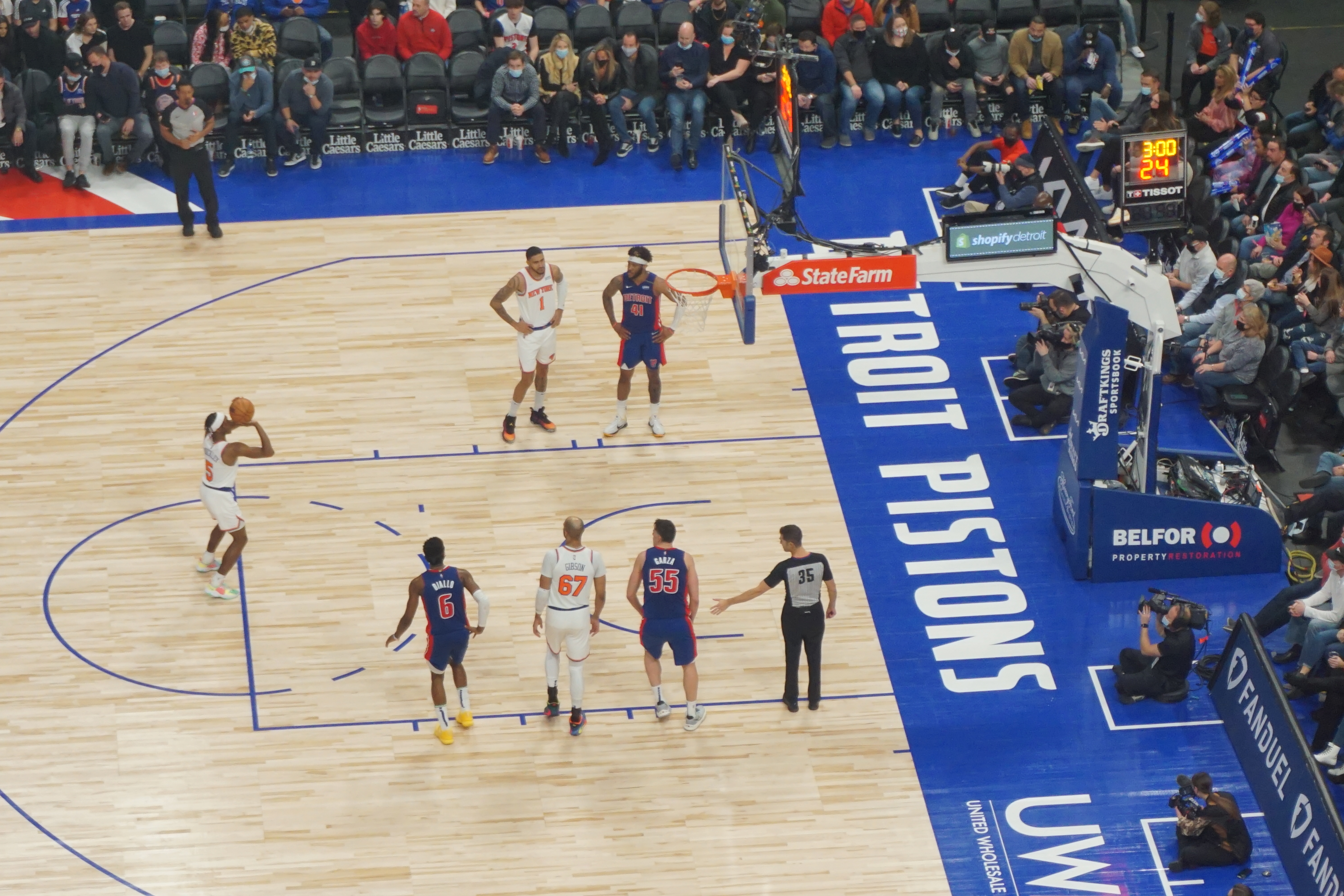
Immanuel Quickley of the New York Knicks shoots a free throw during a game versus the Detroit Pistons.

Free throws are organized in procession. The shooter takes his place behind the free-throw line (5.8 m (19 ft) from the base line, 4.6 m (15 ft) from the front of the basket). All the other players must stand in their correct places until the ball leaves the shooter's hands: up to four people in the NCAA rules and three people in the FIBA rules from the defensive team and two people from the shooting team line up along the sides of the restricted area (keyhole, paint, lane). These players are usually the ones that rebound the ball. Three line up on each side. A defensive player always takes the place closest to the basket.

The remaining players must remain behind the three-point line and the "free-throw line extended" (an imaginary line extended from the free-throw line in both directions to the sidelines).

Leaving their designated places before the ball leaves the shooter's hands, or interfering with the ball, are violations. In addition, the shooter must release the ball within five seconds (ten seconds in the United States) and must not step on or over the free-throw line until the ball touches the hoop. Players are, however, permitted to jump while attempting the free throw, provided they do not leave the designated area at any point. A violation by the shooter cancels the free throw; a violation by the defensive team results in a substitute free throw if the shooter missed; a violation by the offensive team or a shot that completely misses the hoop results in the loss of possession to the defensive team (only if it is on the last free throw).

Under FIBA rules, if the shooter does not commit a violation, and the ball goes in the basket, the attempt is successful, regardless of violations committed by any member of the non-shooting team.

Lane violation
| | Offensive players (excluding shooter) | Both teams' players | Defensive players | Shooter |
|---|---|---|---|---|
| Made | Free throw is not counted (Not the last free throw); Turnover (Last free throw) | Free throw is counted | Free throw is counted, and another is taken | Turnover (FIBA) |
| Missed | Free throw is not counted (Not the last free throw); Turnover (Last free throw) | Jump ball (NBA, some leagues); Possession arrow (FIBA) | Free throw is retaken | Turnover (FIBA) |

== Free throws awarded (NBA) ==
Foul
Technical; One free throw | Personal
Offensive; Loss of possession^{3} | Loose ball | Defensive | Clear path Two free throws and possession | Flagrant; Two free throws and possession
No penalty^{1} Loss of possession^{3} | Penalty^{1} Two free throws | Shooting | Non-shooting
Shot made One free throw | Shot missed | No penalty^{1} Inbounds pass^{2} | Penalty^{1}
Two-point attempt Two free throws | Three-point attempt Three free throws | Not last two minutes of game: Two free throws | Last two minutes of game
Not away from play: Two free throws | Away from play: One free throw and possession

^{1} Penalty applies to fouls in excess of four in a regulation period or in excess of three in an overtime period. If a team has not committed its foul quota by the two minute mark of a period, it shall be allowed one foul before the penalty applies. Offensive fouls do not count toward this total.
^{2} Defensive fouls committed during an inbounds pass prior to the ball being released result in two free throws regardless of the penalty situation.
^{3} In the NBA, a team must have five players on the court at all times. If a team is down to five players because of injuries and players with six fouls, and a player commits his sixth foul, he remains in the game and a technical foul is charged. The technical foul penalty of one free throw applies.

=== Historical ===
Before the 1954–55 season, the NBA established the rule that a backcourt foul would result in a "three to make two" situation (up to three attempts to make two free throws) if the violating team was over the team foul limit. By 1979, the rule had been extended to the penalty situation for flagrant fouls, fouls made in the act of shooting (resulting in a miss), and fouls due to the swinging of the elbows. Prior to the 1981–82 season, this rule and the related "two to make one" rule were abolished.

In 1956, in response to reports that Wilt Chamberlain was able to dunk free throws, the NCAA established a rule requiring that free-throw shooters keep both feet behind the free-throw line during an attempt. The NBA later adopted this rule.

Starting with the 2017-18 season, in order to reduce wasted time, the NBA implemented a rule change that the free throw shooter may not walk back beyond the three-point line in between free throws. While this did not affect most players, in at least the case of Russell Westbrook, it changed his prior routine of walking back nearly to half-court between shots. His free throw percentage dropped from 82.3% for the nine years prior to the rule change, to 68.5% for the 7 1/2 years since.

== Strategy ==
Free throwing at a Valencia Basket match

As mentioned earlier, some players are notoriously bad free-throw shooters. Historical examples of star players who were poor shooters include Wilt Chamberlain, Ben Wallace, and Shaquille O'Neal. This allows a strategy where a team intentionally fouls this player, hoping that he will miss one or both shots and the defending team will re-gain possession of the ball. This strategy was dubbed Hack-a-Shaq when famously used on Shaquille O'Neal. Dwight Howard, DeAndre Jordan and Andre Drummond have been subjected to this strategy as well, as have other players.

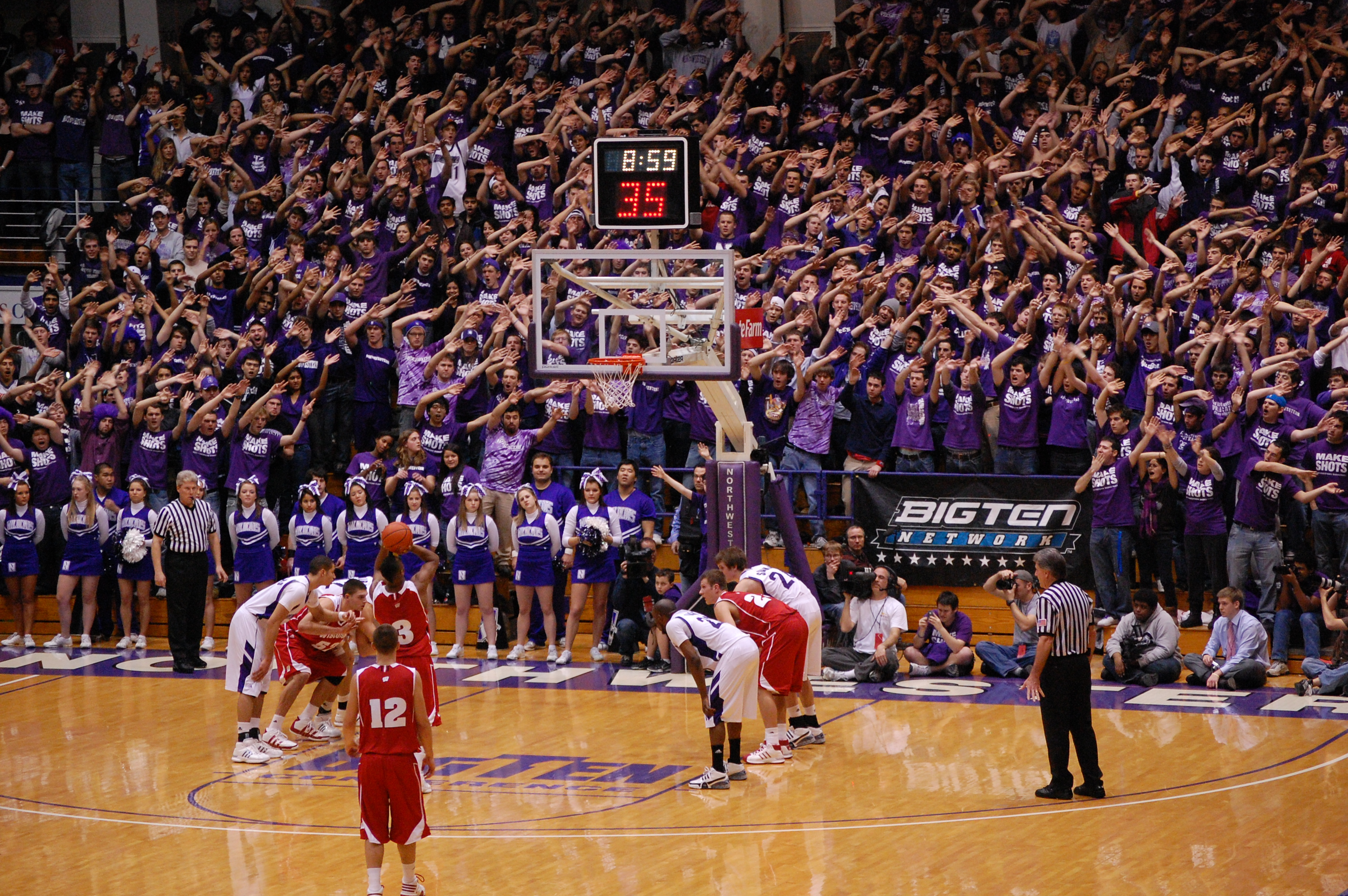
Fans attempting to distract a free throw shooter from the opposing team

It can be advantageous for a trailing team to intentionally foul late in a close game. While this allows the leading team to shoot free throws and increase their lead, it also stops the clock, similar to a time out in football (in basketball, a time out may only be called by a team with possession of the ball). Additionally, it allows the trailing team the chance to take possession if the second free throw is missed, and if it is made awards possession outright to the trailing team. Therefore, many teams substitute players with high free-throw percentages when they are leading late in games to combat this strategy. It is seen as a last resort strategy with little chance of success, but if it is not employed the leading team may run out the clock and end the game.

A defensive team leading by three may foul an offensive team intentionally late in the game, if the game clock is no greater than a couple of seconds. In such circumstances, the opposing team would most likely not have enough time for multiple possessions. Down three points, the opposing team's obvious strategy would be to attempt a three-pointer to try to send the game into overtime; however, the leading team may attempt to foul the trailing team before a shot is attempted, as this would lead to only two free throws which is not enough to tie the game. If the trailing team is placed into the situation of shooting two free throws, they must attempt to intentionally miss the second free throw in the hopes of securing the offensive rebound (which is harder than normal with free throws, as the defending team is automatically given position) and scoring before the game clock expires – if the first free throw is made, a two-pointer would tie the game, and a three-pointer would win the game; if the first free throw is missed, only a three-pointer would tie the game. Theoretically, adopting this strategy makes a leading team four times more likely to win the game than allowing the trailing team to attempt a three-pointer.

== Technique ==
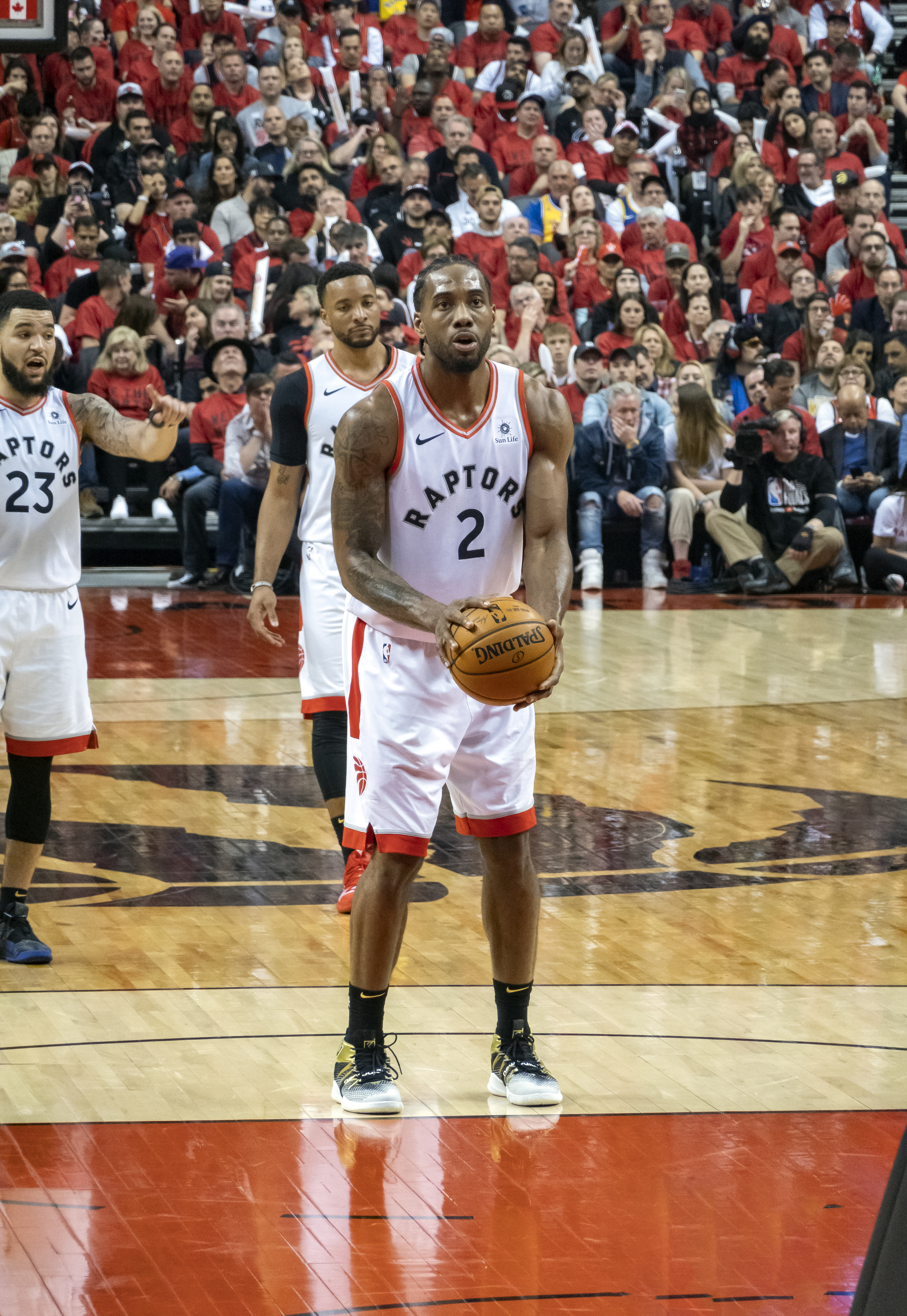
Kawhi Leonard at the free-throw line during Game 2 of the 2019 NBA Finals

To shoot a free throw, a player must position their body with both feet fully behind the free throw line. Players will either position both feet square to the line or will have one foot forward in a split stance. While standing as close to the line as possible is typically advantageous, players like Nick Van Exel have been known to take a few steps (1–2 feet) back from the line to shoot from a farther distance. Many players perform a "ritual" before shooting free throws; this can range from bouncing the ball off the floor or touching their shoes to more unusual and iconic rituals, such as Gilbert Arenas wrapping the ball around his waist 3 times or Jeff Hornacek touching his face once for each of his children. Once prepared, the player will bend his legs to generate power, extend the ball over his head, and shoot in a form similar to the typical basketball jump shot, although they will not always leave the ground during a free throw.

Nearly every adult professional player shoots free throws in this overhand style, despite both theoretical and practical demonstrations that the underhand style (aka "granny-style") usually produces better average results. NBA player and underhand free-throw shooter Rick Barry retired in 1980 while ranked 1st in NBA history at the time with a 90.0% average of successful free throws. There have been very few professional players who have used this technique since; the vast majority of players decline to use the technique for fear of ridicule or for similar reasons unrelated to performance. Famously bad free throw shooter Shaquille O'Neal once said in an interview, "I told Rick Barry I'd rather shoot 0% than shoot underhand. I'm too cool for that." Professionals who have adopted the style include Chinanu Onuaku and Barry's son Canyon.

== See also ==
- 50–40–90 club, players who successfully shoot at least 90% of free throws in addition to other criteria
- List of National Basketball Association career free throw scoring leaders
- List of National Basketball Association annual free throw percentage leaders
- List of NCAA Division I men's basketball career free throw scoring leaders
- NBA records
