= Delphi Interactive =

American video game company

Delphi Interactive Inc.
- Type: Private
- Industry: Video games
- Founded: 2020; 6 years ago in Los Angeles, California, United States
- Founder: Casper Daugaard
- Headquarters: Los Angeles, California, United States
- Key people: Casper Daugaard (CEO); Andy Kleinman (President); Julien Merceron (CTO); Theodor Tang-Peronard (VP and Partner)
- Products: 007 First Light (2026); FIFA World Cup: Launch Edition (2026)
- Website: www.delphiinteractive.com

Delphi Interactive is a video game development and publishing company based in Los Angeles, California. The company focuses on video games based on existing properties and franchises. Delphi was founded in 2020 by Casper Daugaard. The company's first two games are the James Bond multiplatform title 007 First Light, released in May 2026, and the FIFA World Cup: Launch Edition game, which was released on June 11, 2026 via Netflix.

== History ==
Daugaard formed Delphi Interactive in 2020. Delphi licenses, finances, develops, and publishes games built around existing IP from other owners. Daugaard has stated that Delphi works outside of what he refers to as the "publisher industrial complex".

Delphi's first game is 007 First Light. Delphi licensed the intellectual property from Eon Productions and Amazon MGM Studios. IO Interactive developed and published the game, released in May 2026, in association with Delphi. 007 First Light is available for PlayStation 5, Xbox Series X/S, PC, and GeForce Now, and is in development for Nintendo Switch 2. In June 2026, Delphi released the live service association football simulation game FIFA World Cup: Launch Edition, licensed by FIFA and playable exclusively on Netflix, coinciding with the 2026 FIFA World Cup. The game's developer Refactor Games was reported in August 2026 to have had 85 percent of its workforce laid off by Delphi, their partial owners.

== Operations ==
Andy Kleinman, president of Delphi Interactive, was previously an executive at Zynga and Scopely, where he worked in licensing intellectual property for mobile games. He was also CEO of Wonder, a smartphone startup. Julien Merceron, who was previously worldwide technology director at Konami and Ubisoft, joined the company as CTO in January 2026. He oversees technical and development strategy, with focus on the 2026 FIFA game. Theodor Tang-Peronard is a partner and vice president of strategy and operations at Delphi Interactive; he is also an executive producer of the company’s FIFA game.

Delphi is a part owner of Refactor Games, a developer of the 2022 association football game Football Simulator. Refactor, based at Delphi's headquarters in Los Angeles, is supporting Delphi's work on the 2026 FIFA game with Netflix.
