= FIFA World Cup: Launch Edition =

- Developer: Refactor Games
- Publisher: Delphi Interactive
- Series: FIFA
- Platform: Netflix
- Release: June 11, 2026
- Genres: Sports, football simulation
- Modes: Single-player, multiplayer

FIFA World Cup: Launch Edition is an association football simulation live service video game developed by Refactor Games and published by Delphi Interactive under license from FIFA. The game was released on 11 June 2026, coinciding with the opening day of the 2026 FIFA World Cup. It is available exclusively through Netflix Games and is included with a Netflix subscription. It is the first game released in the FIFA series since the split from EA Sports, releasing two weeks before FIFA Heroes.

== Gameplay ==
FIFA World Cup: Launch Edition is a streamlined football simulation game designed for casual and multiplayer play. Players can control matches using a mobile phone connected to a television through a QR-code pairing system. The game supports up to four players simultaneously.

At launch, the game featured all 48 national teams participating in the 2026 FIFA World Cup, all 16 tournament stadiums, and more than 1,200 licensed players.

== Development and release ==
In December 2025, Netflix announced that it was collaborating with FIFA and Delphi Interactive on a football video game tied to the 2026 FIFA World Cup.

On 4 June 2026, FIFA and Netflix Games officially revealed the title FIFA World Cup: Launch Edition and announced its release for 11 June 2026, the same day as the opening match of the 2026 FIFA World Cup.

According to FIFA, the game was intended as the first release in a broader football gaming strategy following the end of the organization's long-running partnership with EA Sports. FIFA described the title as a "Launch Edition" that would receive additional features and updates over time. In August 2026, Refactor Games was reported to have 85 percent of the studio workforce laid off by Delphi Interactive, partial-owners of the studio.

== Reception ==
Aftermath's Luke Plunkett was very critical of the game, finding fault with the dated graphics, poor artificial intelligence and the touchscreen-based controls. He believed the FIFA World Cup license was mishandled by all the parties involved with the game, stating that "the greed, the laziness, the contempt, all of it, this video game is somehow the encapsulation of almost everything wrong with modern sports, modern entertainment and the cost-cutting executive class." Video Games Chronicle's Chris Scullion also had the same criticisms, though he praised the licensed soundtrack.
