= 2026 FIFA World Cup =

Soccer tournament in Canada, Mexico, and the United States

Coupe du Monde de la FIFA 2026 (French) Copa Mundial de la FIFA 2026 (Spanish)

Tournament details
- Host countries: Canada; Mexico; United States
- Dates: June 11 – July 19
- Teams: 48 (from 6 confederations)
- Venues: 16 (in 16 host cities)

Final positions
- Champions: Spain (2nd title)
- Runners-up: Argentina
- Third place: England
- Fourth place: France

Tournament statistics
- Matches played: 104
- Goals scored: 308 (2.96 per match)
- Attendance: 6,810,966 (65,490 per match)
- Top scorer: (France national football team) Kylian Mbappé (10 goals)
- Best player: (Spain national football team) Rodri
- Best young player: (Spain national football team) Pau Cubarsí
- Best goalkeeper: (Spain national football team) Unai Simón
- Fair play award: Netherlands

The 2026 FIFA World Cup (Note: Also marketed as FIFA World Cup 26 and FIFA World Cup 2026) was the 23rd FIFA World Cup, the quadrennial international men's soccer championship contested by the national teams of the member associations of FIFA. The tournament began on June 11, 2026, and concluded on July 19 with Spain winning the championship for the second time. It was jointly hosted by 16 cities—11 in the United States, 3 in Mexico, and 2 in Canada. The tournament was the first FIFA World Cup to be hosted by three countries and the first to include 48 teams, an expansion from the previous 32-team format.

The 2026 tournament was the second World Cup to be hosted by multiple nations, after the 2002 edition. Mexico became the first country to host the World Cup three times, having hosted the 1970 and 1986 tournaments. The United States previously hosted the World Cup in 1994, while it was Canada's first time hosting the men's tournament. The event returned to its traditional June–July schedule after the 2022 World Cup in Qatar, which was uniquely held in November and December to avoid Qatar's extreme summer heat. Canada, Mexico, and the United States qualified automatically as hosts, while Cape Verde, Curaçao, Jordan, and Uzbekistan made their World Cup debuts.

For the first time in the tournament's history, the top four teams from the FIFA Men's World Ranking at the time of the contest (Argentina, Spain, France, and England) advanced to the semifinals. Spain won the final against defending champion Argentina 1–0 after extra time, winning its second title and first since 2010. Spain became the first nation to become the reigning champion for both the men's and women's World Cups simultaneously, and the first team to win the World Cup while conceding only one goal during the entire tournament. France captain Kylian Mbappé won his second consecutive Golden Boot for scoring the most goals (10) during the tournament. He became the all-time leading goalscorer at the World Cup and the first player to win multiple World Cup Golden Boots. The average number of goals per match in the tournament was 2.96, the highest since the 1970 edition.

Spain's captain Rodri won the Golden Ball as the best player of the tournament. Unai Simón won the Golden Glove as the tournament's best goalkeeper, while Pau Cubarsí won the Young Player Award as the tournament's best young player. Nearly 7 million people attended matches during the tournament, surpassing the 1994 edition to set a new record for the highest attendance in World Cup history. The 2026 World Cup reportedly generated a record $15 billion in revenue.

== Format ==
=== Expansion ===
The idea of expanding the tournament had been suggested as early as 2013 by then-UEFA president Michel Platini, as well as in 2016 by current FIFA president Gianni Infantino. Opponents of the proposal argued that the number of matches played was already at an unacceptable level, that the expansion would dilute the quality of the matches, and that the decision was driven by political rather than sporting concerns, specifically that Infantino was trying to win his election by promising to bring more countries to the World Cup.

Starting with the 2026 edition, the World Cup expanded to 48 teams, an increase of 16 teams compared to the previous seven tournaments. As approved by the FIFA Council on March 14, 2023, the teams were split into 12 groups of 4 teams, with the top 2 teams in each group and the 8 best third-place teams progressing to a new round of 32. It was the first expansion and format change since 1998.

The total number of matches played increased from 64 to 104, and the number of matches played by teams reaching the semifinals increased from 7 to 8. The tournament lasted 39 days, an increase from the 32 days of the 2014 and 2018 tournaments, and from the 29 days of the 2022 tournament, although each team still played three group matches. The final matchday at club level for players named in the final squads was May 24, 2026; clubs had to release their players by May 25, with exceptions granted to players participating in continental club competition finals up until May 30. The combined rest, release, and tournament periods remained 56 days, the same as in the 2010, 2014, and 2018 World Cups.

==== Other expansion formats explored ====
After the expansion to 48 teams was approved on January 10, 2017, it was initially decided that the tournament would include 16 groups of 3 teams, with the top two teams of each group progressing to a round of 32. This format would have included 80 matches in total, with the maximum number of matches per team remaining at seven, although each team would have played one fewer group match than in the 2022 tournament. The tournament would still have been completed within 32 days. This format was chosen over three alternatives involving 40 to 48 teams, 76 to 88 matches, and a minimum of 1 to 4 matches per team. (Note: Attributed to multiple references:)

Critics of this format argued that the use of three-team groups with two teams progressing significantly increased the risk of collusion between teams. This prompted FIFA to suggest that penalty shootouts could be used to prevent draws in the group stage, although even then some risk of collusion would remain, as it was possible for the two teams playing the last group match to engineer a circle of death result that would allow both of them to qualify. The tournament format was finalized in 2023, with an announcement that there would be 12 groups of 4 teams.

=== New rules ===
The 2026 FIFA World Cup introduced several rule changes, primarily designed to reduce time-wasting. The new rules included:

- 10-second substitutions: Players being substituted had ten seconds to exit the field; otherwise, the substitute had to wait for one minute before entering the match.
- 5-second restarts: A visual 5-second countdown was shown by the referee for throw-ins and goal kicks in situations of time-wasting. If the ball was not put into play in time, a restart was awarded to the opposing team; a corner kick was awarded if the infraction occurred with a goal kick.
- Medical treatment: Any outfield player who received medical attention on the field had to leave the field and wait for 1 minute before returning to play.
- Expanded video assistant referee (VAR): The VAR could review and overturn wrongly awarded corner kicks, certain attacking fouls, and clear mistakes on red cards given from a second yellow card.
- Mouth-covering red cards: To stop confrontational or insulting behavior which was concealed to avoid lip-reading, any player who covered his mouth with his hand, arm, or shirt while confronting an opponent was sent off.
- Player leaving the field in protest: Players or officials who left the field in protest were sent off.

Another change was the tiebreaker formula used when two or more teams finish the group stage with an equal number of points. The first tiebreaker criteria was the number of points earned in head-to-head matches between the tied teams, not the goal difference among all matches. (Note: Attributed to multiple references:)

=== Mandatory breaks ===
Cooling or hydration breaks were introduced at the 2014 World Cup in Brazil. For the 2026 World Cup, FIFA introduced mandatory three-minute hydration breaks in every half for all matches. Broadcasters were permitted to run commercials during these pauses. Since the clock did not stop during the breaks, the three minutes were automatically included in the stoppage time for each half.

=== Match schedule ===
The match schedule, without group assignments, was announced on February 4, 2024. (Note: Attributed to multiple references:) On June 13, FIFA released an updated schedule, with specific pairings assigned to venues for the knockout stage. The full schedule was unveiled in a live broadcast on December 6, 2025, the day after the draw. The opening match of the tournament included Mexico, and took place on June 11, 2026, at the Estadio Azteca in Mexico City. Canada's first match occurred on June 12 at BMO Field in Toronto, while the United States' opening match took place on the same day at SoFi Stadium in Inglewood. The national team of each host nation played its three group stage matches in its own country.

AT&T Stadium in Arlington hosted the most matches of any venue, with nine. The U.S. hosted 78 matches, including all quarterfinals, semifinals, and the final, which was played at MetLife Stadium in East Rutherford on July 19. Canada and Mexico each hosted 13 matches. Each tournament venue, except for the Estadio Akron, hosted at least one knockout stage match. The match schedule overlapped with the 2026 Canadian Football League season, resulting in scheduling conflicts and loss of home games for the Toronto Argonauts and BC Lions. The match schedule also affected the 2026 Major League Baseball season schedules of the Kansas City Royals, Philadelphia Phillies, Seattle Mariners, and Texas Rangers, with home stadiums near World Cup venues.

Host cities were geographically grouped into three regions:

- Western Region (Vancouver, Seattle, San Francisco Bay Area, Los Angeles)
- Central Region (Guadalajara, Mexico City, Monterrey, Houston, Dallas, Kansas City)
- Eastern Region (Atlanta, Miami, Toronto, Boston, Philadelphia, New York/New Jersey)

However, even during the group stage, about half of the teams had to play matches in two different regions.

Schedule by round
Stage	Matchday	Date
Group	1	June 11–17
Group	2	June 18–23
Group	3	June 24–27
Knockout	Round of 32	June 28 – July 3
Knockout	Round of 16	July 4–7
Knockout	Quarterfinals	July 9–11
Knockout	Semifinals	July 14–15
Knockout	Match for third place	July 18
Knockout	Final	July 19

Schedule by group
Matchday	Pairings	Groups	Date
1	1 vs 2; 3 vs 4	A	June 11
1	1 vs 2; 3 vs 4	B & D	June 12
1	1 vs 2; 3 vs 4	B, C & D	June 13
1	1 vs 2; 3 vs 4	E & F	June 14
1	1 vs 2; 3 vs 4	G & H	June 15
1	1 vs 2; 3 vs 4	I & J	June 16
1	1 vs 2; 3 vs 4	K & L	June 17
2	1 vs 3; 4 vs 2	A & B	June 18
2	1 vs 3; 4 vs 2	C & D	June 19
2	1 vs 3; 4 vs 2	E & F	June 20
2	1 vs 3; 4 vs 2	G & H	June 21
2	1 vs 3; 4 vs 2	I & J	June 22
2	1 vs 3; 4 vs 2	K & L	June 23
3	4 vs 1; 2 vs 3	A, B & C	June 24
3	4 vs 1; 2 vs 3	D, E & F	June 25
3	4 vs 1; 2 vs 3	G, H & I	June 26
3	4 vs 1; 2 vs 3	J, K & L	June 27

== Host selection ==
The United 2026 bid beat a rival bid by Morocco during a final vote at the 68th FIFA Congress in Moscow in 2018. The previous year, FIFA president Gianni Infantino had stated that Europe (UEFA confederation) and Asia (AFC) would be excluded from the bidding following the selection of Russia for the 2018 World Cup and Qatar for the 2022 tournament. Therefore, the 2026 World Cup could be hosted by one of the remaining four confederations: CONCACAF (North America; last hosted in 1994), CAF (Africa; last hosted in 2010), CONMEBOL (South America; last hosted in 2014), or OFC (Oceania, never hosted), or potentially by AFC or UEFA in case no bid from the others met FIFA's requirements.

Co-hosting of the World Cup—which had been suspended by FIFA after the 2002 edition—was approved for the enlarged 2026 tournament. Canada, Mexico, and the United States had each considered bidding for the tournament separately; the United joint bid was announced on April 10, 2017. The Moroccan bid was announced that August.

=== Voting ===
Voting for the host was open to 203 FIFA member associations. The United bid won with 134 votes, while the Morocco bid received 65 votes. Iran voted for neither of the two bids, while Cuba, Slovenia, and Spain abstained from voting. Ghana had been suspended by FIFA for corruption and was therefore ineligible to vote. (Note: Attributed to multiple references:) Morocco was later selected as a co-host of the 2030 FIFA World Cup, alongside Portugal, Spain, Argentina, Paraguay, and Uruguay.

Voting results
Nation	Vote	Map
Nation	Round 1	
Canada, Mexico, United States	134	
Morocco	65	
None of the bids	1	
Abstentions	3	Allowed to vote / Ineligible to vote; Voted for United bid / Canada–Mexico–United States; Voted for Moroccan bid / Morocco; Voted for neither / Sanctioned by FIFA; Abstained from voting / Not a FIFA member
Total valid votes	200	Allowed to vote / Ineligible to vote; Voted for United bid / Canada–Mexico–United States; Voted for Moroccan bid / Morocco; Voted for neither / Sanctioned by FIFA; Abstained from voting / Not a FIFA member
Required for majority	101	Allowed to vote / Ineligible to vote; Voted for United bid / Canada–Mexico–United States; Voted for Moroccan bid / Morocco; Voted for neither / Sanctioned by FIFA; Abstained from voting / Not a FIFA member

== Venues ==
Location map of the 2026 FIFA World Cup venues

During the bidding process, 41 cities with 42 existing, fully functional venues with regular tenants (except Olympic Stadium in Montreal) and two venues then under construction (Allegiant Stadium in Las Vegas and SoFi Stadium in Los Angeles) submitted to be part of the bid: three venues in three cities in Mexico, six venues in six cities in Canada, and 35 venues in 32 cities in the United States. A first-round elimination removed nine venues and nine cities. A second-round elimination cut an additional nine venues in six cities, while three venues in three cities (Soldier Field in Chicago, U.S. Bank Stadium in Minneapolis, and BC Place in Vancouver) dropped out because FIFA was unwilling to negotiate financial details. After Montreal dropped out in July 2021 because it lacked provincial funding and support to renovate Olympic Stadium, Vancouver rejoined the bid as a candidate city in April 2022, bringing the total number to 24 venues, each in its own city or metropolitan area.

On June 16, 2022, the sixteen host cities–two in Canada, three in Mexico, and eleven in the United States–were announced by FIFA: Atlanta, Boston, Dallas, Guadalajara, Houston, Kansas City, Los Angeles, Mexico City, Miami, Monterrey, New York/New Jersey, Philadelphia, San Francisco Bay Area, Seattle, Toronto, and Vancouver. Eight of the sixteen chosen stadiums had permanent artificial turf surfaces that were replaced with grass under the direction of FIFA and a University of Tennessee–Michigan State University research team. Depending on the venue's climate, the turf used was either a hybrid of 84% Kentucky bluegrass and 16% perennial ryegrass (for cooler temperatures), or Bermuda grass (for warmer temperatures).

Four venues (Atlanta, Dallas, Houston, and Vancouver) were indoor stadiums that used retractable roof systems, all equipped with climate control, while a fifth, SoFi Stadium in Los Angeles, was open-air but had a translucent roof and no climate control. The host of the final match—MetLife Stadium in East Rutherford, New Jersey—was announced by FIFA on February 4, 2024.

Although there were soccer-specific stadiums in Canada and the United States, the largest soccer-specific stadium in the U.S., Geodis Park in Nashville, Tennessee, seated 30,000, fell short of FIFA's minimum requirement of 40,000 seats (Toronto's BMO Field was expanded from 30,000 to 45,500 for this tournament). Stadiums including Mercedes-Benz Stadium in Atlanta; Gillette Stadium in Foxborough, Massachusetts; and Lumen Field in Seattle have been used by both National Football League (NFL) and Major League Soccer (MLS) teams. Although the Canadian and American stadiums were primarily used for gridiron football, they were also designed to accommodate soccer matches.

Mexico City was the only capital of the three host nations chosen as a venue site; Ottawa and Washington, D.C., joined Bonn (West Germany, 1974) and Tokyo (Japan, 2002) as the only capital cities not selected to host World Cup matches. Washington was a host city candidate, but the poor state of Northwest Stadium caused the city to combine its bid with nearby Baltimore's M&T Bank Stadium, which was unsuccessful. Other cities eliminated from the final hosting list were Cincinnati, Denver, Nashville, Orlando, and Edmonton. Ottawa's candidate venue, TD Place Stadium, was eliminated early on for insufficient capacity. Eight of the metropolitan areas involved had previously hosted World Cup matches (Dallas, Los Angeles, San Francisco Bay Area, New York/New Jersey, and Boston in 1994; Guadalajara and Mexico City in both 1970 and 1986; Monterrey in 1986), but none of the stadiums used in the 1994 FIFA World Cup were used in this tournament (though Gillette Stadium and MetLife Stadium were located at the same sites as two of the 1994 venues, Foxboro Stadium and Giants Stadium respectively). Soldier Field in Chicago, the Cotton Bowl in Dallas, and the Rose Bowl in Pasadena (Los Angeles area) were the only stadiums in the bidding process to have hosted matches in 1994, but none of them were selected. Estadio Azteca in Mexico City was the only stadium in this tournament that had previously been used for a World Cup, in both 1970 and 1986; it thus became the only stadium to be used for three World Cups.

FIFA's rules on stadium sponsorships required venues to use alternative names for the duration of the tournament, shown in parentheses below. (Note: The sponsorship names for Arrowhead Stadium and Estadio Azteca (GEHA Field at Arrowhead Stadium and Estadio Banorte, respectively) were replaced not with their historical non-sponsor names but with the names of their cities.) The capacity is based on information published by FIFA.

Key
† denotes a stadium used for previous men's World Cup tournaments.
‡ denotes an indoor stadium with a fixed or retractable roof with interior climate control.

List of tournament venues
City (Note: Where two names are given, the first is the metropolitan area and the second is the specific municipality.)	Stadium	Number of matches	Capacity	Image
Mexico City	Estadio Azteca† (Mexico City Stadium)	5 (3 group, 2 knockout)	80,824	
(United States) New York/New Jersey (East Rutherford, New Jersey)	MetLife Stadium (New York New Jersey Stadium)	8 (5 group, 2 knockout, and the final)	80,663	
(United States) Dallas (Arlington, Texas)	AT&T Stadium‡ (Dallas Stadium)	9 (5 group, 4 knockout)	70,649	
(United States) Los Angeles (Inglewood, California)	SoFi Stadium‡ (Los Angeles Stadium)	8 (5 group, 3 knockout)	70,492	
(United States) Kansas City	Arrowhead Stadium (Kansas City Stadium)	6 (4 group, 2 knockout)	69,045	
(United States) San Francisco Bay Area (Santa Clara, California)	Levi's Stadium (San Francisco Bay Area Stadium)	6 (5 group, 1 knockout)	68,827	
(United States) Houston	NRG Stadium‡ (Houston Stadium)	7 (5 group, 2 knockout)	68,777	
(United States) Philadelphia	Lincoln Financial Field (Philadelphia Stadium)	6 (5 group, 1 knockout)	68,324	
(United States) Atlanta	Mercedes-Benz Stadium‡ (Atlanta Stadium)	8 (5 group, 3 knockout)	68,239	
(United States) Seattle	Lumen Field (Seattle Stadium)	6 (4 group, 2 knockout)	66,925	
(United States) Miami (Miami Gardens, Florida)	Hard Rock Stadium (Miami Stadium)	7 (4 group, 2 knockout, and third-place)	64,478	
(United States) Boston (Foxborough, Massachusetts)	Gillette Stadium (Boston Stadium)	7 (5 group, 2 knockout)	64,146	
(Canada) Vancouver	BC Place‡ (BC Place Vancouver)	7 (5 group, 2 knockout)	52,497	
(Mexico) Monterrey (Guadalupe, Nuevo León)	Estadio BBVA (Estadio Monterrey)	4 (3 group, 1 knockout)	51,243	
(Mexico) Guadalajara (Zapopan, Jalisco)	Estadio Akron (Estadio Guadalajara)	4 (4 group)	45,664	
(Canada) Toronto	BMO Field (Toronto Stadium)	6 (5 group, 1 knockout)	43,036	

== Teams ==
=== Qualification ===
Team qualified Team eliminated Team withdrew or suspended Not a FIFA member

On August 31, 2022, FIFA president Gianni Infantino confirmed that six CONCACAF teams would qualify for the World Cup, with Canada, Mexico, and the United States automatically qualifying as hosts. This was confirmed by the FIFA Council on February 14, 2023.

Immediately prior to the 67th FIFA Congress, the FIFA Council approved the slot allocation during a meeting in Manama, Bahrain. This included an inter-confederation playoff tournament involving six teams to decide the last two FIFA World Cup spots. The six teams in the playoffs comprised one team from each confederation excluding UEFA, and one additional team from the confederation of the host countries (CONCACAF). Two of those teams were seeded based on the World Rankings, and they played the winners of two knockout matches between the four unseeded teams for the two FIFA World Cup berths. The four-match tournament was played in Mexico, one of the host countries, and was also used as a test event for the FIFA World Cup.

The ratification of slot allocation also gave the OFC a guaranteed berth in the final tournament for the first time: the 2026 FIFA World Cup was the first tournament in which all six confederations had at least one guaranteed berth and also the first time since the 2010 edition in which all confederations had a team qualify for the World Cup finals.

Of the 48 qualified teams, 26 also appeared in the 2022 edition. Highlights include:

- Cape Verde, Curaçao, Jordan, and Uzbekistan (Note: Until 1991, Uzbekistan was part of the Soviet Union, which competed at seven World Cup tournaments. Following the dissolution of the Soviet Union, Uzbekistan became the third former Soviet republic to compete as an independent nation after Russia (1994, 2002, 2014 and 2018) and Ukraine (2006). FIFA considers Russia to be the successor team of the Soviet Union.) made their World Cup debuts.
- Qatar qualified for the tournament through qualification for the first time, as its only previous appearance was as host in 2022.
- DR Congo (Note: From 1971 to 1997, DR Congo competed as Zaire. This was the first time the country competed as DR Congo.) and Haiti returned to the tournament after appearing in their only previous tournament in 1974.
- Iraq returned to the tournament after appearing in its only previous tournament in 1986.
- Austria, Norway, and Scotland returned to the tournament after last appearing in 1998.

Four-time champion Italy failed to qualify after losing the European playoff final to Bosnia and Herzegovina on penalties, becoming the first former champion to miss three consecutive World Cups; as in 2018 and 2022, Italy was the only former champion that did not qualify. With a FIFA Men's World Ranking of 12, Italy was also the highest-ranking team that did not qualify.

The qualified teams, listed by region, with numbers in parentheses indicating final positions in the FIFA Men's World Ranking before the tournament were:

AFC (9)

- Australia (27)
- Iran (Note: Recognized as IR Iran by FIFA) (20)
- Iraq (57)
- Japan (18)
- Jordan (63; debut)
- Qatar (56)
- Saudi Arabia (61)
- South Korea (Note: Recognized as Korea Republic by FIFA) (25)
- Uzbekistan (50; debut)

CAF (10)

- Algeria (28)
- Cape Verde (Note: Recognized as Cabo Verde by FIFA) (67; debut)
- DR Congo (Note: Recognized as Congo DR by FIFA) (46)
- Egypt (29)
- Ghana (73)
- Ivory Coast (Note: Recognized as Côte d'Ivoire by FIFA) (33)
- Morocco (7)
- Senegal (15)
- South Africa (60)
- Tunisia (45)

CONCACAF (6)

- Canada (30; co-host)
- Curaçao (82; debut)
- Haiti (83)
- Mexico (14; co-host)
- Panama (34)
- United States (Note: Recognized as USA by FIFA) (17; co-host)

CONMEBOL (6)

- Argentina (1)
- Brazil (6)
- Colombia (13)
- Ecuador (23)
- Paraguay (41)
- Uruguay (16)

OFC (1)

- New Zealand (85)

UEFA (16)

- Austria (24)
- Belgium (9)
- Bosnia and Herzegovina (64)
- Croatia (11)
- Czech Republic (Note: Recognized as Czechia by FIFA) (40)
- England (4)
- France (3)
- Germany (10)
- Netherlands (8)
- Norway (31)
- Portugal (5)
- Scotland (42)
- Spain (2)
- Sweden (38)
- Switzerland (19)
- Turkey (Note: Recognized as Türkiye by FIFA) (22)

=== Draw ===
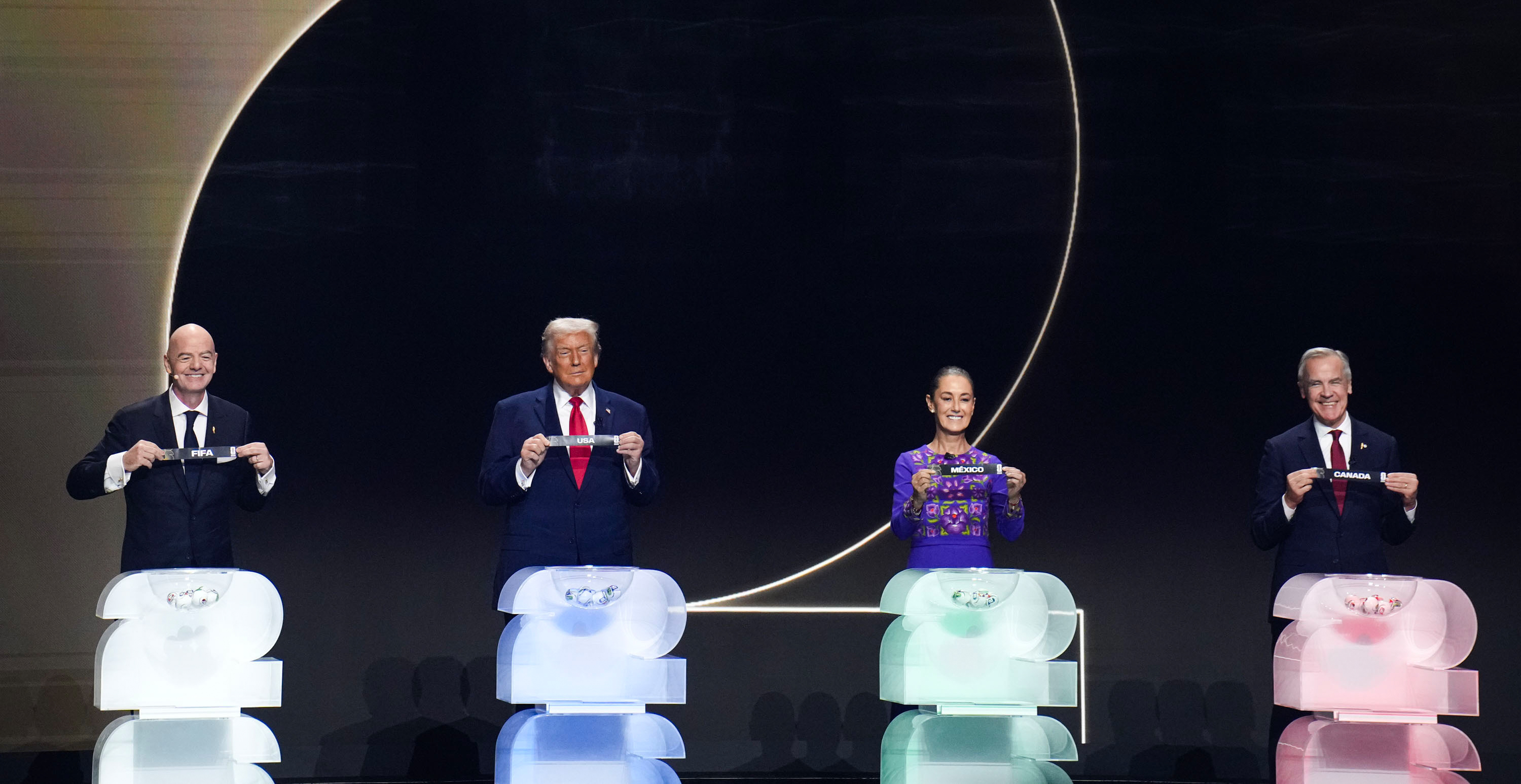
From left to right, FIFA president Gianni Infantino, U.S. president Donald Trump, Mexican president Claudia Sheinbaum, and Canadian prime minister Mark Carney at the start of the draw.

The draw took place on December 5, 2025, at the Kennedy Center in Washington, D.C. The draw ceremony began with FIFA presenting the first FIFA Peace Prize to Donald Trump, an award which fueled scrutiny and ridicule among human rights groups, analysts, and others.

The 48 teams were divided into four pots of 12. Pot 1 consisted of the three hosts and the top nine teams from the November 2025 FIFA Men's World Ranking. Pots 2, 3, and 4 consisted of the remaining teams according to the ranking. The four winners of the UEFA playoffs and the two winners of the inter-confederation playoffs were not known at the time of the draw and thus were automatically allocated to Pot 4. The 12 groups were randomly formed by selecting one team from each of the four pots. With the exception of UEFA, no group could have more than one team from the same confederation drawn into it.

The three host nations were pre-allocated to three groups for scheduling purposes. Mexico was placed in Group A, Canada in Group B, and the United States in Group D.

The confederation restriction applied to all three potential winners of the inter-confederation playoffs. FIFA also announced that, "in the interest of ensuring competitive balance", the teams ranked first (Spain), second (Argentina), third (France), and fourth (England) would be drawn into opposite pathways. Therefore, should these teams win their groups, they would be unable to meet until the semifinals, and the first and second ranked teams would be unable to meet until the final. The draw started with Pot 1 and ended with Pot 4, with each team selected and then allocated into the first available group alphabetically. For the purpose of the match schedule, the Pot 1 teams were automatically drawn into position 1 of each group. For the remaining pots, FIFA established a predetermined pattern to define the position of teams based on their pot and the group they were drawn into.

Pots (Note: The number in parentheses indicates the FIFA ranking of teams as of November 19, 2025.)
Pot 1	Pot 2	Pot 3	Pot 4
1. United States (co-host) (14); 2. Mexico (co-host) (15); 3. Canada (co-host) (27); 4. Spain (1); 5. Argentina (2); 6. France (3); 7. England (4); 8. Brazil (5); 9. Portugal (6); 10. Netherlands (7); 11. Belgium (8); 12. Germany (9)	13. Croatia (10); 14. Morocco (11); 15. Colombia (13); 16. Uruguay (16); 17. Switzerland (17); 18. Japan (18); 19. Senegal (19); 20. Iran (20); 21. South Korea (22); 22. Ecuador (23); 23. Austria (24); 24. Australia (26)	25. Norway (29); 26. Panama (30); 27. Egypt (34); 28. Algeria (35); 29. Scotland (36); 30. Paraguay (39); 31. Tunisia (40); 32. Ivory Coast (42); 33. Uzbekistan (50); 34. Qatar (51); 35. Saudi Arabia (60); 36. South Africa (61)	37. Jordan (66); 38. Cape Verde (68); 39. Ghana (72); 40. Curaçao (82); 41. Haiti (84); 42. New Zealand (86); 43. UEFA Path A winner (Note: The winners of the UEFA playoffs and inter-confederation playoffs were not known at the time of the draw, as those matches were held on 26 and 31 March 2026.); 44. UEFA Path B winner 45. UEFA Path C winner 46. UEFA Path D winner 47. IC Path 1 winner (Note: The placeholder for the inter-confederation playoff Pathway 1 winner adhered to the confederation restrictions of a CAF, CONCACAF, or OFC team.); 48. IC Path 2 winner (Note: The placeholder for the inter-confederation playoff Pathway 2 winner adhered to the confederation restrictions of an AFC, CONCACAF, or CONMEBOL team.)

=== Team base camps ===
Each of the 48 teams established a "base camp", where they stayed and trained before and during the World Cup. (Note: Attributed to multiple references:)

=== Squads ===
Before submitting their final squad for the World Cup, teams named a provisional squad of between 35 and 55 players one month prior to the tournament. Teams were required to name their final squads by June 2. If a player became too injured or ill to participate in the tournament, he could be replaced by another player from the provisional squad until 24 hours before the team's first match. However, an injured or ill goalkeeper could be replaced by another goalkeeper from the provisional squad at any time during the tournament.

=== Travel distances ===
Teams participating in the 2026 World Cup had to travel an average of 5,146 total miles (8,281.7 km) between venues during the tournament. For the 2014 tournament in Brazil, the average distance was 7,054 miles (11,352.2 km), while teams playing in the 2018 tournament in Russia traveled an average of 5,441 miles (8,756.4 km).

== Officiating ==
On April 9, 2026, FIFA announced 52 referees, 88 assistant referees, and 30 video assistant referees for the tournament. The 2026 World Cup featured six female match officials, equalling the record for the highest number of female officials appointed to a men's World Cup. Tori Penso, Brooke Mayo, and Kathryn Nesbitt became the second all-female on-field refereeing trio at a men's World Cup, officiating the Group A match between Czech Republic and South Africa at Atlanta Stadium.

On June 9, 2026, Somali referee Omar Artan was denied entry into the United States despite holding valid travel documents, and FIFA later removed him from the list of referees. FIFA stated that Artan would receive his full World Cup salary despite not being able to officiate in the tournament.

== Ceremonies ==
=== Opening ceremonies ===
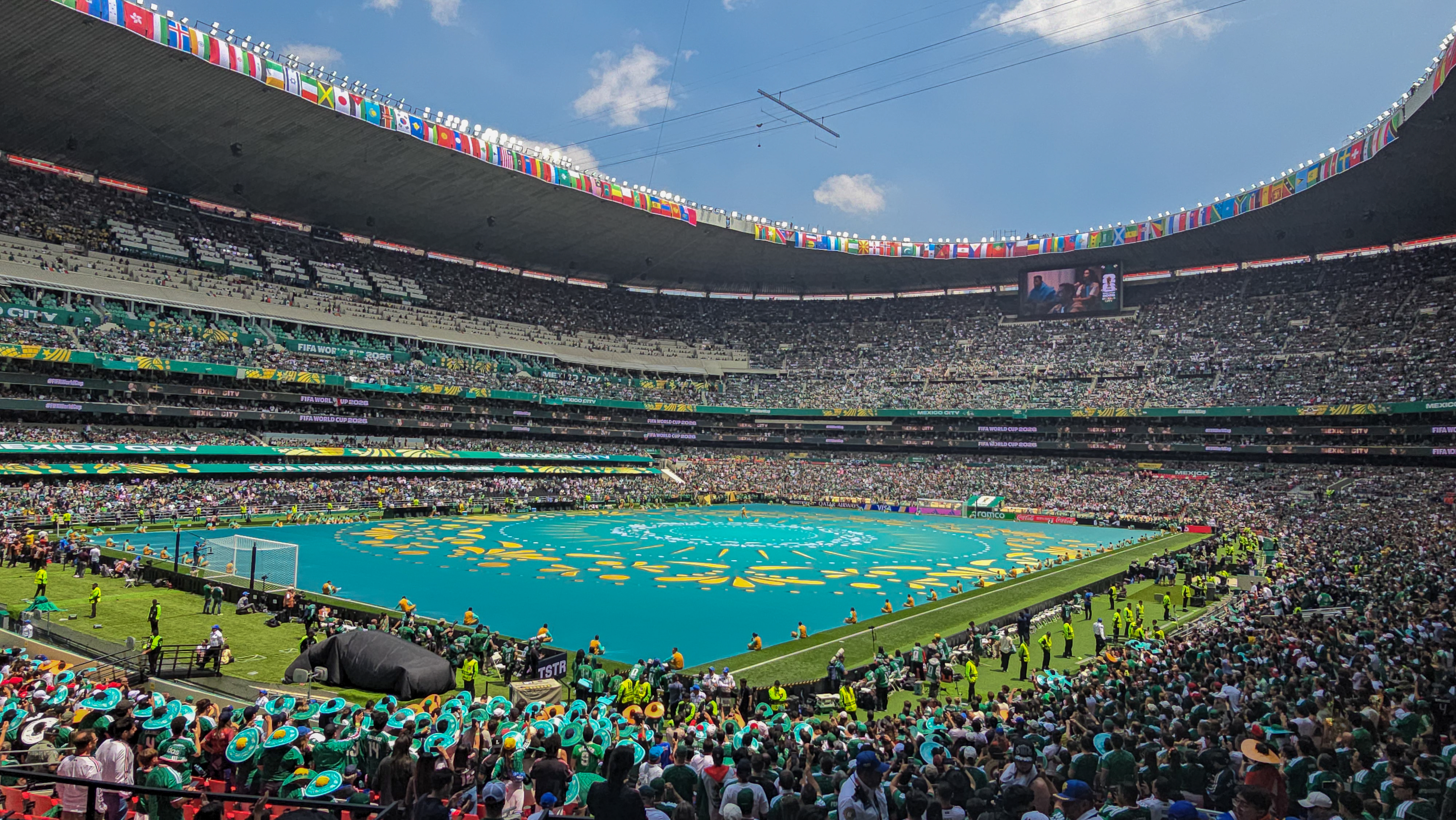
Inside Estadio Azteca during the Mexican opening ceremony prior to the first match of the 2026 FIFA World Cup.

The tournament featured three opening ceremonies, one for each of the hosts. The opening ceremony in Mexico took place on June 11, 2026, at Estadio Azteca. Mexican singer Alejandro Fernández performed "Himno Nacional Mexicano" and South African singer Tyla performed the "National Anthem of South Africa". On June 12, the Canadian opening ceremony took place at BMO Field in Toronto. Canadian-American musician Alanis Morissette performed "O Canada" while Serbian-Canadian violinist Aleksandar Gajić performed "Državna himna Bosne i Hercegovine". On the same day, the opening ceremony in the United States took place at SoFi Stadium in Los Angeles. American country duo Dan + Shay performed "The Star-Spangled Banner" while Paraguayan soul duo Purahei Soul performed "Himno Nacional Paraguayo".

=== 1,000th FIFA World Cup match ===
The Group F game between Tunisia and Japan, played at Estadio BBVA in Monterrey on June 20, was the 1,000th match in FIFA World Cup history. To mark the occasion, FIFA organized a special pre-match ceremony. Princess Takamado, the Honorary Patron of the Japan Football Association, attended the event as a special guest. Japan won the match 4–0, securing its place in the knockout stage, while Tunisia suffered its second consecutive defeat and was eliminated from the tournament.

=== Independence Day ceremonies ===
The Roots performing during the Philadelphia ceremony

On July 4, ceremonies took place at Lincoln Financial Field in Philadelphia (Paraguay vs France) and NRG Stadium in Houston (Canada vs Morocco) to honor the United States Semiquincentennial. The Houston ceremony featured pyrotechnics, video-board graphics, and a performance of "The Star-Spangled Banner" by United States Navy Band Chief Musician Maia Rodriguez. The Philadelphia ceremony featured pyrotechnics, video-board signage, and a performance of "The Star-Spangled Banner" by Idina Menzel, as well as musical performances by the Roots, ceremonial elements featuring the Philadelphia Boys Choir & Chorale and Miss Pennsylvania, Stephanie Skinner, a card stunt, a flyby of VFA-11 and VFA-81 squadrons from Naval Air Station Oceana, and a halftime show from DJ Jazzy Jeff.

=== Closing ceremony ===
The closing ceremony took place before the World Cup final at MetLife Stadium in New Jersey, and featured performances by Laura Pausini, Nicole Scherzinger, Robbie Williams, IShowSpeed, and Post Malone, as well as an appearance from Tom Cruise. Jennifer Hudson performed "The Star-Spangled Banner".

=== Final halftime show ===
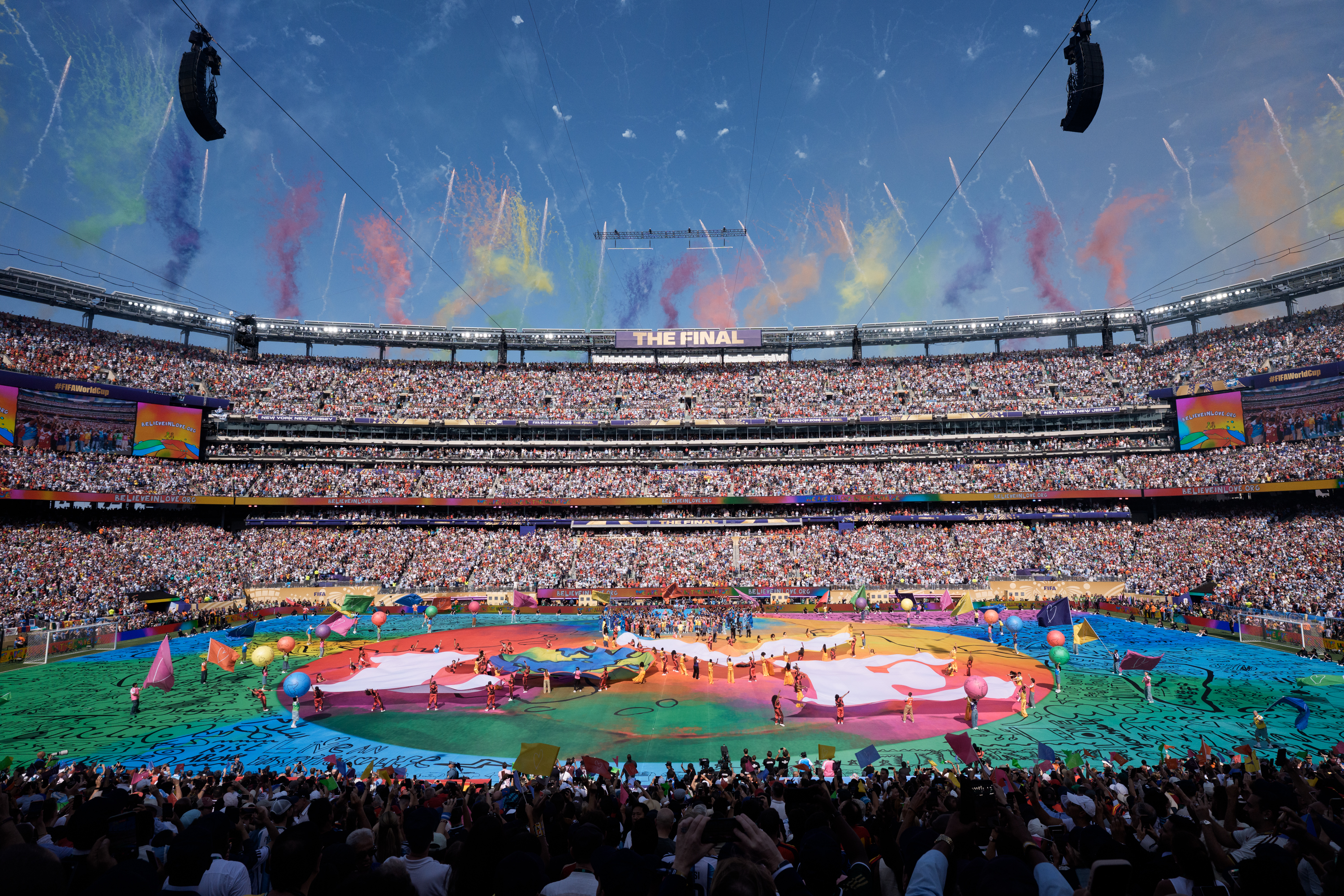
The World Cup final halftime show at MetLife Stadium

The final match featured the first-ever Super Bowl–style halftime show in FIFA World Cup history. Madonna, Shakira, and BTS headlined the 11-minute halftime show, which was curated by Chris Martin of Coldplay and produced by Global Citizen. Justin Bieber, Burna Boy, Gustavo Dudamel, the Muppets, and the PS22 Chorus (featuring Coldplay) also performed in the show.

== Group stage ==
Result of countries participating in the 2026 FIFA World Cup Champion Runner-up Third place Fourth place Quarterfinals Round of 16 Round of 32 Group stage

The round-robin group stage was played in twelve groups (A to L) of four teams each, from June 11 to June 27. Teams were awarded three points for a win, one for a draw, and none for a loss. Following the conclusion of group play, the top two teams of each group, along with the eight best third-place teams, advanced to the knockout stage.

All times are local.

Tie-breaking criteria for group stage ranking
The ranking of teams in each group was determined by the points obtained in all group matches. If two or more teams were equal on points, the following criteria were used to determine the ranking:
1. Most points obtained in the group matches played between the teams concerned;
2. Superior goal difference in the group matches played between the teams concerned;
3. Most goals scored in the group matches played between the teams concerned;

If, after having applied criteria a to c, teams still had an equal ranking, criteria a to c were reapplied exclusively to the matches between the teams who were still level to determine their final rankings. (Note: When there were two or more teams tied on points, criteria a to c were applied. After these criteria were applied, they may have defined the position of some of the teams involved, but not all of them. For example, if there was a three-way tie on points, the application of the first three criteria may only have broken the tie for one of the teams, leaving the other two teams still tied. In this case, the tiebreaking procedure was resumed, from the beginning, for those teams that were still tied.) If this procedure did not lead to a decision, criteria d to h applied.

4. Superior goal difference in all group matches;
5. Most goals scored in all group matches;
6. Highest team conduct ("fair play") score in all group matches (only one deduction could be applied to a player or team coach/official in a single match):
  - Yellow card: −1 point;
  - Indirect red card (second yellow card): −3 points;
  - Direct red card: −4 points;
  - Yellow card and direct red card: −5 points;
7. Better position in the most recent FIFA Men's World Ranking;
8. Better position in progressively older FIFA Men's World Rankings until teams could be separated.

=== Group A ===
Pos	Team	Pld	W	D	L	GF	GA	GD	Pts	Qualification
1	Mexico (H)	3	3	0	0	6	0	+6	9	Advance to knockout stage
2	South Africa	3	1	1	1	2	3	−1	4	Advance to knockout stage
3	South Korea	3	1	0	2	2	3	−1	3	
4	Czech Republic	3	0	1	2	2	6	−4	1	

Source: FIFA
(H) Hosts

June 11, 2026
Mexico	2–0	South Africa	Estadio Azteca, Mexico City
South Korea	2–1	Czech Republic	Estadio Akron, Zapopan
June 18, 2026
Czech Republic	1–1	South Africa	Mercedes-Benz Stadium, Atlanta
Mexico	1–0	South Korea	Estadio Akron, Zapopan
June 24, 2026
Czech Republic	0–3	Mexico	Estadio Azteca, Mexico City
South Africa	1–0	South Korea	Estadio BBVA, Guadalupe

=== Group B ===
Pos	Team	Pld	W	D	L	GF	GA	GD	Pts	Qualification
1	Switzerland	3	2	1	0	7	3	+4	7	Advance to knockout stage
2	Canada (H)	3	1	1	1	8	3	+5	4 (Note: Tied on head-to-head result (Canada 1–1 Bosnia and Herzegovina). Overall goal difference was used as the tiebreaker.)	Advance to knockout stage
3	Bosnia and Herzegovina	3	1	1	1	5	6	−1	4	Advance to knockout stage
4	Qatar	3	0	1	2	2	10	−8	1	

Source: FIFA
(H) Hosts
Notes:

June 12, 2026
Canada	1–1	Bosnia and Herzegovina	BMO Field, Toronto
June 13, 2026
Qatar	1–1	Switzerland	Levi's Stadium, Santa Clara
June 18, 2026
Switzerland	4–1	Bosnia and Herzegovina	SoFi Stadium, Inglewood
Canada	6–0	Qatar	BC Place, Vancouver
June 24, 2026
Switzerland	2–1	Canada	BC Place, Vancouver
Bosnia and Herzegovina	3–1	Qatar	Lumen Field, Seattle

=== Group C ===
Pos	Team	Pld	W	D	L	GF	GA	GD	Pts	Qualification
1	Brazil	3	2	1	0	7	1	+6	7 (Note: Tied on head-to-head result (Brazil 1–1 Morocco). Overall goal difference was used as the tiebreaker.)	Advance to knockout stage
2	Morocco	3	2	1	0	6	3	+3	7	Advance to knockout stage
3	Scotland	3	1	0	2	1	4	−3	3	
4	Haiti	3	0	0	3	2	8	−6	0	

Source: FIFA
Notes:

June 13, 2026
Brazil	1–1	Morocco	MetLife Stadium, East Rutherford
Haiti	0–1	Scotland	Gillette Stadium, Foxborough
June 19, 2026
Scotland	0–1	Morocco	Gillette Stadium, Foxborough
Brazil	3–0	Haiti	Lincoln Financial Field, Philadelphia
June 24, 2026
Scotland	0–3	Brazil	Hard Rock Stadium, Miami Gardens
Morocco	4–2	Haiti	Mercedes-Benz Stadium, Atlanta

=== Group D ===
Pos	Team	Pld	W	D	L	GF	GA	GD	Pts	Qualification
1	United States (H)	3	2	0	1	8	4	+4	6	Advance to knockout stage
2	Australia	3	1	1	1	2	2	0	4 (Note: Tied on head-to-head result (Paraguay 0–0 Australia). Overall goal difference was used as the tiebreaker.)	Advance to knockout stage
3	Paraguay	3	1	1	1	2	4	−2	4	Advance to knockout stage
4	Turkey	3	1	0	2	3	5	−2	3	

Source: FIFA
(H) Hosts
Notes:

June 12, 2026
United States	4–1	Paraguay	SoFi Stadium, Inglewood
June 13, 2026
Australia	2–0	Turkey	BC Place, Vancouver
June 19, 2026
United States	2–0	Australia	Lumen Field, Seattle
Turkey	0–1	Paraguay	Levi's Stadium, Santa Clara
June 25, 2026
Turkey	3–2	United States	SoFi Stadium, Inglewood
Paraguay	0–0	Australia	Levi's Stadium, Santa Clara

=== Group E ===
Pos	Team	Pld	W	D	L	GF	GA	GD	Pts	Qualification
1	Germany	3	2	0	1	10	4	+6	6 (Note: Head-to-head result: Germany 2–1 Ivory Coast.)	Advance to knockout stage
2	Ivory Coast	3	2	0	1	4	2	+2	6	Advance to knockout stage
3	Ecuador	3	1	1	1	2	2	0	4	Advance to knockout stage
4	Curaçao	3	0	1	2	1	9	−8	1	

Source: FIFA
Notes:

June 14, 2026
Germany	7–1	Curaçao	NRG Stadium, Houston
Ivory Coast	1–0	Ecuador	Lincoln Financial Field, Philadelphia
June 20, 2026
Germany	2–1	Ivory Coast	BMO Field, Toronto
Ecuador	0–0	Curaçao	Arrowhead Stadium, Kansas City
June 25, 2026
Curaçao	0–2	Ivory Coast	Lincoln Financial Field, Philadelphia
Ecuador	2–1	Germany	MetLife Stadium, East Rutherford

=== Group F ===
Pos	Team	Pld	W	D	L	GF	GA	GD	Pts	Qualification
1	Netherlands	3	2	1	0	10	4	+6	7	Advance to knockout stage
2	Japan	3	1	2	0	7	3	+4	5	Advance to knockout stage
3	Sweden	3	1	1	1	7	7	0	4	Advance to knockout stage
4	Tunisia	3	0	0	3	2	12	−10	0	

Source: FIFA

June 14, 2026
Netherlands	2–2	Japan	AT&T Stadium, Arlington
Sweden	5–1	Tunisia	Estadio BBVA, Guadalupe
June 20, 2026
Netherlands	5–1	Sweden	NRG Stadium, Houston
Tunisia	0–4	Japan	Estadio BBVA, Guadalupe
June 25, 2026
Japan	1–1	Sweden	AT&T Stadium, Arlington
Tunisia	1–3	Netherlands	Arrowhead Stadium, Kansas City

=== Group G ===
Pos	Team	Pld	W	D	L	GF	GA	GD	Pts	Qualification
1	Belgium	3	1	2	0	6	2	+4	5 (Note: Tied on head-to-head result (Belgium 1–1 Egypt). Overall goal difference was used as the tiebreaker.)	Advance to knockout stage
2	Egypt	3	1	2	0	5	3	+2	5	Advance to knockout stage
3	Iran	3	0	3	0	3	3	0	3	
4	New Zealand	3	0	1	2	4	10	−6	1	

Source: FIFA
Notes:

June 15, 2026
Belgium	1–1	Egypt	Lumen Field, Seattle
Iran	2–2	New Zealand	SoFi Stadium, Inglewood
June 21, 2026
Belgium	0–0	Iran	SoFi Stadium, Inglewood
New Zealand	1–3	Egypt	BC Place, Vancouver
June 26, 2026
Egypt	1–1	Iran	Lumen Field, Seattle
New Zealand	1–5	Belgium	BC Place, Vancouver

=== Group H ===
Pos	Team	Pld	W	D	L	GF	GA	GD	Pts	Qualification
1	Spain	3	2	1	0	5	0	+5	7	Advance to knockout stage
2	Cape Verde	3	0	3	0	2	2	0	3	Advance to knockout stage
3	Uruguay	3	0	2	1	3	4	−1	2 (Note: Tied on head-to-head result (Saudi Arabia 1–1 Uruguay). Overall goal difference was used as the tiebreaker.)	
4	Saudi Arabia	3	0	2	1	1	5	−4	2	

Source: FIFA
Notes:

June 15, 2026
Spain	0–0	Cape Verde	Mercedes-Benz Stadium, Atlanta
Saudi Arabia	1–1	Uruguay	Hard Rock Stadium, Miami Gardens
June 21, 2026
Spain	4–0	Saudi Arabia	Mercedes-Benz Stadium, Atlanta
Uruguay	2–2	Cape Verde	Hard Rock Stadium, Miami Gardens
June 26, 2026
Cape Verde	0–0	Saudi Arabia	NRG Stadium, Houston
Uruguay	0–1	Spain	Estadio Akron, Zapopan

=== Group I ===
Pos	Team	Pld	W	D	L	GF	GA	GD	Pts	Qualification
1	France	3	3	0	0	10	2	+8	9	Advance to knockout stage
2	Norway	3	2	0	1	8	7	+1	6	Advance to knockout stage
3	Senegal	3	1	0	2	8	6	+2	3	Advance to knockout stage
4	Iraq	3	0	0	3	1	12	−11	0	

Source: FIFA

June 16, 2026
France	3–1	Senegal	MetLife Stadium, East Rutherford
Iraq	1–4	Norway	Gillette Stadium, Foxborough
June 22, 2026
France	3–0	Iraq	Lincoln Financial Field, Philadelphia
Norway	3–2	Senegal	MetLife Stadium, East Rutherford
June 26, 2026
Norway	1–4	France	Gillette Stadium, Foxborough
Senegal	5–0	Iraq	BMO Field, Toronto

=== Group J ===
Pos	Team	Pld	W	D	L	GF	GA	GD	Pts	Qualification
1	Argentina	3	3	0	0	8	1	+7	9	Advance to knockout stage
2	Austria	3	1	1	1	6	6	0	4 (Note: Tied on head-to-head result (Algeria 3–3 Austria). Overall goal difference was used as the tiebreaker.)	Advance to knockout stage
3	Algeria	3	1	1	1	5	7	−2	4	Advance to knockout stage
4	Jordan	3	0	0	3	3	8	−5	0	

Source: FIFA
Notes:

June 16, 2026
Argentina	3–0	Algeria	Arrowhead Stadium, Kansas City
Austria	3–1	Jordan	Levi's Stadium, Santa Clara
June 22, 2026
Argentina	2–0	Austria	AT&T Stadium, Arlington
Jordan	1–2	Algeria	Levi's Stadium, Santa Clara
June 27, 2026
Algeria	3–3	Austria	Arrowhead Stadium, Kansas City
Jordan	1–3	Argentina	AT&T Stadium, Arlington

=== Group K ===
Pos	Team	Pld	W	D	L	GF	GA	GD	Pts	Qualification
1	Colombia	3	2	1	0	4	1	+3	7	Advance to knockout stage
2	Portugal	3	1	2	0	6	1	+5	5	Advance to knockout stage
3	DR Congo	3	1	1	1	4	3	+1	4	Advance to knockout stage
4	Uzbekistan	3	0	0	3	2	11	−9	0	

Source: FIFA

June 17, 2026
Portugal	1–1	DR Congo	NRG Stadium, Houston
Uzbekistan	1–3	Colombia	Estadio Azteca, Mexico City
June 23, 2026
Portugal	5–0	Uzbekistan	NRG Stadium, Houston
Colombia	1–0	DR Congo	Estadio Akron, Zapopan
June 27, 2026
Colombia	0–0	Portugal	Hard Rock Stadium, Miami Gardens
DR Congo	3–1	Uzbekistan	Mercedes-Benz Stadium, Atlanta

=== Group L ===
Pos	Team	Pld	W	D	L	GF	GA	GD	Pts	Qualification
1	England	3	2	1	0	6	2	+4	7	Advance to knockout stage
2	Croatia	3	2	0	1	5	5	0	6	Advance to knockout stage
3	Ghana	3	1	1	1	2	2	0	4	Advance to knockout stage
4	Panama	3	0	0	3	0	4	−4	0	

Source: FIFA

June 17, 2026
England	4–2	Croatia	AT&T Stadium, Arlington
Ghana	1–0	Panama	BMO Field, Toronto
June 23, 2026
England	0–0	Ghana	Gillette Stadium, Foxborough
Panama	0–1	Croatia	BMO Field, Toronto
June 27, 2026
Panama	0–2	England	MetLife Stadium, East Rutherford
Croatia	2–1	Ghana	Lincoln Financial Field, Philadelphia

=== Ranking of third-place teams ===
Pos	Grp	Team	Pld	W	D	L	GF	GA	GD	Pts	Qualification
1	K	DR Congo	3	1	1	1	4	3	+1	4	Advance to knockout stage
2	F	Sweden	3	1	1	1	7	7	0	4	Advance to knockout stage
3	L	Ghana	3	1	1	1	2	2	0	4 (Note: Team conduct score: Ghana −3, Ecuador −5.)	Advance to knockout stage
4	E	Ecuador	3	1	1	1	2	2	0	4	Advance to knockout stage
5	B	Bosnia and Herzegovina	3	1	1	1	5	6	−1	4	Advance to knockout stage
6	J	Algeria	3	1	1	1	5	7	−2	4	Advance to knockout stage
7	D	Paraguay	3	1	1	1	2	4	−2	4	Advance to knockout stage
8	I	Senegal	3	1	0	2	8	6	+2	3	Advance to knockout stage
9	G	Iran	3	0	3	0	3	3	0	3	
10	A	South Korea	3	1	0	2	2	3	−1	3	
11	C	Scotland	3	1	0	2	1	4	−3	3	
12	H	Uruguay	3	0	2	1	3	4	−1	2	

Source: FIFA
Rules for classification: 1) Points; 2) Goal difference; 3) Goals scored; 4) Team conduct ("fair play") score; 5) Latest FIFA ranking (June 11, 2026); 6) Previous FIFA ranking(s) report.
Notes:

The specific matchups involving the third-place teams depended on which eight third-place teams qualified for the round of 32, but not on their relative rankings. The 495 possible combinations were published in Annex C of the tournament regulations. Because of the specific combination of qualified teams, option number 67 of annex C was applicable.

== Knockout stage ==
The knockout stage used a single-elimination format, starting with the newly introduced round of 32 on June 28 and culminating with the final on July 19, with a match for third place the day before. If the score was even after regulation time in a match, 30 minutes of extra time were added. If still tied after this, a penalty shootout determined the winner.

=== Bracket ===
Round of 32
June 29 – Foxborough
Germany	1 (3)
Paraguay (p)	1 (4)
June 30 – East Rutherford
France	3
Sweden	0
June 28 – Inglewood
South Africa	0
Canada	1
June 29 – Guadalupe
Netherlands	1 (2)
Morocco (p)	1 (3)
July 2 – Toronto
Portugal	2
Croatia	1
July 2 – Inglewood
Spain	3
Austria	0
July 1 – Santa Clara
United States	2
Bosnia and Herzegovina	0
July 1 – Seattle
Belgium (a.e.t.)	3
Senegal	2
June 29 – Houston
Brazil	2
Japan	1
June 30 – Arlington
Ivory Coast	1
Norway	2
June 30 – Mexico City
Mexico	2
Ecuador	0
July 1 – Atlanta
England	2
DR Congo	1
July 3 – Miami Gardens
Argentina (a.e.t.)	3
Cape Verde	2
July 3 – Arlington
Australia	1 (2)
Egypt (p)	1 (4)
July 2 – Vancouver
Switzerland	2
Algeria	0
July 3 – Kansas City
Colombia	1
Ghana	0

Round of 16
July 4 – Philadelphia
Paraguay	0
France	1
July 4 – Houston
Canada	0
Morocco	3
July 6 – Arlington
Portugal	0
Spain	1
July 6 – Seattle
United States	1
Belgium	4
July 5 – East Rutherford
Brazil	1
Norway	2
July 5 – Mexico City
Mexico	2
England	3
July 7 – Atlanta
Argentina	3
Egypt	2
July 7 – Vancouver
Switzerland (p)	0 (4)
Colombia	0 (3)

Quarterfinals
July 9 – Foxborough
France	2
Morocco	0
July 10 – Inglewood
Spain	2
Belgium	1
July 11 – Miami Gardens
Norway	1
England (a.e.t.)	2
July 11 – Kansas City
Argentina (a.e.t.)	3
Switzerland	1

Semifinals
July 14 – Arlington
France	0
Spain	2
July 15 – Atlanta
England	1
Argentina	2

Final
July 19 – East Rutherford
Spain (a.e.t.)	1
Argentina	0
Match for third place
July 18 – Miami Gardens
France	4
England	6

=== Round of 32 ===
June 28, 2026
12:00 p.m. UTC−7

South Africa	0–1	Canada
	(Note: "South Africa vs Canada | Round of 32 | FIFA World Cup 2026". FIFA. Retrieved June 28, 2026.; "Match Report – Round of 32 – South Africa v. Canada". FIFA. June 28, 2026. Retrieved June 28, 2026.; "Post match summary report – Round of 32 – South Africa v. Canada". FIFA. June 29, 2026. Retrieved June 29, 2026.)	Eustáquio 90+2'

SoFi Stadium, Inglewood
Attendance: 69,237
Referee: João Pinheiro (Portugal)

June 29, 2026
12:00 p.m. UTC−5

Brazil	2–1	Japan
Casemiro 56'; Martinelli 90+5'	(Note: "Brazil vs Japan | Round of 32 | FIFA World Cup 2026". FIFA. Retrieved June 29, 2026.; "Match Report – Round of 32 – Brazil v. Japan". FIFA. June 29, 2026. Retrieved June 29, 2026.; "Post match summary report – Round of 32 – Brazil v. Japan". FIFA. June 30, 2026. Retrieved June 30, 2026.)	Sano 29'

NRG Stadium, Houston
Attendance: 68,777
Referee: Maurizio Mariani (Italy)

June 29, 2026
4:30 p.m. UTC−4

Germany	1–1 (a.e.t.)	Paraguay
Havertz 54'	(Note: "Germany vs Paraguay | Round of 32 | FIFA World Cup 2026". FIFA. Retrieved June 29, 2026.; "Match Report – Round of 32 – Germany v. Paraguay". FIFA. June 29, 2026. Retrieved June 29, 2026.; "Post match summary report – Round of 32 – Germany v. Paraguay". FIFA. June 30, 2026. Retrieved June 30, 2026.)	Enciso 42'
Penalties
Havertz (penalty missed); Kimmich (penalty scored); Musiala (penalty scored); Woltemade (penalty missed); Amiri (penalty scored); Tah (penalty missed)	3–4	(penalty scored) Maurício; (penalty scored) G. Gómez; (penalty scored) Galarza; (penalty missed) Sanabria; (penalty missed) Balbuena; (penalty scored) Canale

Gillette Stadium, Foxborough
Attendance: 63,945
Referee: Jalal Jayed (Morocco)

June 29, 2026
7:00 p.m. UTC−6

Netherlands	1–1 (a.e.t.)	Morocco
Gakpo 72'	(Note: "Netherlands vs Morocco | Round of 32 | FIFA World Cup 2026". FIFA. Retrieved June 30, 2026.; "Match Report – Round of 32 – Netherlands v. Morocco". FIFA. June 30, 2026. Retrieved June 30, 2026.; "Post match summary report – Round of 32 – Netherlands v. Morocco". FIFA. June 30, 2026. Retrieved June 30, 2026.)	Diop 90+1'
Penalties
Koopmeiners (penalty scored); Kluivert (penalty missed); Weghorst (penalty scored); Timber (penalty missed); Summerville (penalty missed)	2–3	(penalty missed) El Aynaoui; (penalty scored) Rahimi; (penalty scored) Talbi; (penalty missed) Hakimi; (penalty scored) Saibari

Estadio BBVA, Guadalupe
Attendance: 51,243
Referee: Wilton Sampaio (Brazil)

June 30, 2026
12:00 p.m. UTC−5

Ivory Coast	1–2	Norway
Diallo 74'	(Note: "Côte d'Ivoire vs Norway | Round of 32 | FIFA World Cup 2026". FIFA. Retrieved June 30, 2026.; "Match Report – Round of 32 – Côte d'Ivoire v. Norway". FIFA. June 30, 2026. Retrieved June 30, 2026.; "Post match summary report – Round of 32 – Côte d'Ivoire vs. Norway". FIFA. July 1, 2026. Retrieved July 1, 2026.)	Nusa 39'; Haaland 86'

AT&T Stadium, Arlington
Attendance: 69,665
Referee: Jesús Valenzuela (Venezuela)

June 30, 2026
5:00 p.m. UTC−4

France	3–0	Sweden
Mbappé 45', 74'; Barcola 53'	(Note: "France vs Sweden | Round of 32 | FIFA World Cup 2026". FIFA. Retrieved June 30, 2026.; "Match Report – Round of 32 – France v. Sweden". FIFA. June 30, 2026. Retrieved June 30, 2026.; "Post match summary report – Round of 32 – France vs. Sweden". FIFA. July 1, 2026. Retrieved July 1, 2026.)

MetLife Stadium, East Rutherford
Attendance: 80,663
Referee: Danny Makkelie (Netherlands)

June 30, 2026
8:00 p.m. UTC−6 (Note: The Mexico v Ecuador match, originally scheduled for 7:00 p.m. UTC−6, was delayed by an hour due to adverse weather conditions.)

Mexico	2–0	Ecuador
Quiñones 22'; Jiménez 31'	(Note: "Mexico vs Ecuador | Round of 32 | FIFA World Cup 2026". FIFA. Retrieved July 1, 2026.; "Match Report – Round of 32 – Mexico v. Ecuador". FIFA. July 1, 2026. Retrieved July 1, 2026.; "Post match summary report – Round of 32 – Mexico v. Ecuador". FIFA. July 1, 2026. Retrieved July 1, 2026.)

Estadio Azteca, Mexico City
Attendance: 80,824
Referee: Slavko Vinčić (Slovenia)

July 1, 2026
12:00 p.m. UTC−4

England	2–1	DR Congo
Kane 75', 86'	(Note: "England vs Congo DR | Round of 32 | FIFA World Cup 2026". FIFA. Retrieved July 1, 2026.; "Match Report – Round of 32 – England v. Congo DR". FIFA. July 1, 2026. Retrieved July 1, 2026.; "Post match summary report – Round of 32 – England v. Congo DR". FIFA. July 1, 2026. Retrieved July 3, 2026.)	Cipenga 7'

Mercedes-Benz Stadium, Atlanta
Attendance: 68,239
Referee: Adham Makhadmeh (Jordan)

July 1, 2026
1:00 p.m. UTC−7

Belgium	3–2 (a.e.t.)	Senegal
Lukaku 86'; Tielemans 89', 120+5' (pen.)	(Note: "Belgium vs Senegal | Round of 32 | FIFA World Cup 2026". FIFA. Retrieved June 28, 2026.; "Match Report – Round of 32 – Belgium v. Senegal". FIFA. July 1, 2026. Retrieved July 1, 2026.; "Post match summary report – Round of 32 – Belgium v. Senegal". FIFA. July 1, 2026. Retrieved July 3, 2026.)	Diarra 25'; I. Sarr 51'

Lumen Field, Seattle
Attendance: 66,925
Referee: Saíd Martínez (Honduras)

July 1, 2026
5:00 p.m. UTC−7

United States	2–0	Bosnia and Herzegovina
Balogun 45'; Tillman 82'	(Note: "USA vs Bosnia and Herzegovina | Round of 32 | FIFA World Cup 2026". FIFA. Retrieved July 2, 2026.; "Match Report – Round of 32 – USA v. Bosnia and Herzegovina". FIFA. July 2, 2026. Retrieved July 2, 2026.; "Post match summary report – Round of 32 – USA v. Bosnia and Herzegovina". FIFA. July 1, 2026. Retrieved July 3, 2026.)

Levi's Stadium, Santa Clara
Attendance: 68,827
Referee: Raphael Claus (Brazil)

July 2, 2026
12:00 p.m. UTC−7

Spain	3–0	Austria
Oyarzabal 36', 89'; Porro 66'	(Note: "Spain vs Austria | Round of 32 | FIFA World Cup 2026". FIFA. Retrieved July 2, 2026.; "Match Report – Round of 32 – Spain v. Austria". FIFA. July 2, 2026. Retrieved July 2, 2026.; "Post match summary report – Round of 32 – Spain v. Austria". FIFA. July 2, 2026. Retrieved July 3, 2026.)

SoFi Stadium, Inglewood
Attendance: 70,492
Referee: Glenn Nyberg (Sweden)

July 2, 2026
7:00 p.m. UTC−4

Portugal	2–1	Croatia
Ronaldo 68' (pen.); Ramos 90+4'	(Note: "Portugal vs Croatia | Round of 32 | FIFA World Cup 2026". FIFA. Retrieved July 3, 2026.; "Match Report – Round of 32 – Portugal v. Croatia". FIFA. July 3, 2026. Retrieved July 3, 2026.; "Post match summary report – Round of 32 – Portugal v. Croatia". FIFA. July 2, 2026. Retrieved July 3, 2026.)	Perišić 53'

BMO Field, Toronto
Attendance: 43,036
Referee: Espen Eskås (Norway)

July 2, 2026
8:00 p.m. UTC−7

Switzerland	2–0	Algeria
Embolo 10'; Ndoye 46'	(Note: "Switzerland vs Algeria | Round of 32 | FIFA World Cup 2026". FIFA. Retrieved July 3, 2026.; "Match Report – Round of 32 – Switzerland v. Algeria". FIFA. July 3, 2026. Retrieved July 3, 2026.; "Post match summary report – Round of 32 – Switzerland v. Algeria". FIFA. July 3, 2026. Retrieved July 3, 2026.)

BC Place, Vancouver
Attendance: 52,497
Referee: Yael Falcón (Argentina)

July 3, 2026
1:00 p.m. UTC−5

Australia	1–1 (a.e.t.)	Egypt
Hany 55' (o.g.)	(Note: "Australia vs Egypt | Round of 32 | FIFA World Cup 2026". FIFA. Retrieved July 3, 2026.; "Match Report – Round of 32 – Australia v. Egypt". FIFA. July 3, 2026. Retrieved July 3, 2026.; "Post match summary report – Round of 32 – Australia v. Egypt". FIFA. July 3, 2026. Retrieved July 4, 2026.)	Ashour 13'
Penalties
Souttar (penalty missed); Irvine (penalty scored); Mabil (penalty scored); Herrington (penalty missed)	2–4	(penalty scored) Saber; (penalty scored) Rabia; (penalty scored) Salah; (penalty scored) Abdelmaguid

AT&T Stadium, Arlington
Attendance: 70,244
Referee: Gustavo Tejera (Uruguay)

July 3, 2026
6:00 p.m. UTC−4

Argentina	3–2 (a.e.t.)	Cape Verde
Messi 29'; Li. Martínez 92'; Diney 111' (o.g.)	(Note: "Argentina vs Cabo Verde | Round of 32 | FIFA World Cup 2026". FIFA. Retrieved July 4, 2026.; "Match Report – Round of 32 – Argentina v. Cabo Verde". FIFA. July 4, 2026. Retrieved July 4, 2026.; "Post match summary report – Round of 32 – Argentina v. Cabo Verde". FIFA. July 3, 2026. Retrieved July 4, 2026.)	D. Duarte 59'; Lopes Cabral 103'

Hard Rock Stadium, Miami Gardens
Attendance: 64,478
Referee: Drew Fischer (Canada)

July 3, 2026
8:30 p.m. UTC−5

Colombia	1–0	Ghana
J. Arias 14'	(Note: "Colombia vs Ghana | Round of 32 | FIFA World Cup 2026". FIFA. July 4, 2026. Retrieved July 4, 2026.; "Match Report – Round of 32 – Colombia v. Ghana". FIFA. July 4, 2026. Retrieved July 4, 2026.; "Post match summary report – Round of 32 – Colombia v. Ghana". FIFA. July 3, 2026. Retrieved July 4, 2026.)

Arrowhead Stadium, Kansas City
Attendance: 69,045
Referee: Clément Turpin (France)

=== Round of 16 ===
July 4, 2026
12:00 p.m. UTC−5

Canada	0–3	Morocco
	(Note: "Canada vs Morocco | Round of 16 | FIFA World Cup 2026". FIFA. Retrieved July 4, 2026.; "Match Report – Round of 16 – Canada v. Morocco". FIFA. July 4, 2026. Retrieved July 4, 2026.; "Post match summary report – Round of 16 – Canada v. Morocco". FIFA. July 4, 2026. Retrieved July 6, 2026.)	Ounahi 50', 82'; Rahimi 90+8'

NRG Stadium, Houston
Attendance: 68,777
Referee: Michael Oliver (England)

July 4, 2026
5:00 p.m. UTC−4

Paraguay	0–1	France
	(Note: "Paraguay vs France | Round of 16 | FIFA World Cup 2026". FIFA. Retrieved July 4, 2026.; "Match Report – Round of 16 – Paraguay v. France". FIFA. July 4, 2026. Retrieved July 4, 2026.; "Post match summary report – Round of 16 – Paraguay v. France". FIFA. July 4, 2026. Retrieved July 5, 2026.)	Mbappé 70' (pen.)

Lincoln Financial Field, Philadelphia
Attendance: 68,324
Referee: Ilgiz Tantashev (Uzbekistan)

July 5, 2026
4:00 p.m. UTC−4

Brazil	1–2	Norway
Neymar 90+10' (pen.)	(Note: "Brazil vs Norway | Round of 16 | FIFA World Cup 2026". FIFA. Retrieved July 5, 2026.; "Match Report – Round of 16 – Brazil v. Norway". FIFA. July 5, 2026. Retrieved July 5, 2026.; "Post match summary report – Round of 16 – Brazil v. Norway". FIFA. July 5, 2026. Retrieved July 6, 2026.)	Haaland 79', 90'

MetLife Stadium, East Rutherford
Attendance: 80,663
Referee: Ismail Elfath (United States)

July 5, 2026
7:00 p.m. UTC−6 (Note: The Mexico v England match, originally scheduled for 6:00 p.m. UTC−6, was delayed by an hour due to adverse weather conditions.)

Mexico	2–3	England
Quiñones 42'; Jiménez 69' (pen.)	(Note: "Mexico vs England | Round of 16 | FIFA World Cup 2026". FIFA. Retrieved July 6, 2026.; "Match Report – Round of 16 – Mexico v. England". FIFA. July 6, 2026. Retrieved July 6, 2026.; "Post match summary report – Round of 16 – Mexico v. England". FIFA. July 6, 2026. Retrieved July 6, 2026.)	Bellingham 36', 38'; Kane 60' (pen.)

Estadio Azteca, Mexico City
Attendance: 80,824
Referee: Alireza Faghani (Australia)

July 6, 2026
2:00 p.m. UTC−5

Portugal	0–1	Spain
	(Note: "Portugal vs Spain | Round of 16 | FIFA World Cup 2026". FIFA. Retrieved July 6, 2026.; "Match Report – Round of 16 – Portugal v. Spain". FIFA. July 6, 2026. Retrieved July 6, 2026.; "Post match summary report – Round of 16 – Portugal v. Spain". FIFA. July 6, 2026. Retrieved July 7, 2026.)	Merino 90+1'

AT&T Stadium, Arlington
Attendance: 70,649
Referee: Anthony Taylor (England)

July 6, 2026
5:00 p.m. UTC−7

United States	1–4	Belgium
Tillman 31'	(Note: "USA vs Belgium | Round of 16 | FIFA World Cup 2026". FIFA. Retrieved July 7, 2026.; "Match Report – Round of 16 – USA v. Belgium". FIFA. July 7, 2026. Retrieved July 7, 2026.; "Post match summary report – Round of 16 – USA v. Belgium". FIFA. July 7, 2026. Retrieved July 7, 2026.)	De Ketelaere 9', 33'; Vanaken 57'; Lukaku 90+3'

Lumen Field, Seattle
Attendance: 66,925
Referee: Adham Makhadmeh (Jordan)

July 7, 2026
12:00 p.m. UTC−4

Argentina	3–2	Egypt
Romero 79'; Messi 83'; Fernández 90+2'	(Note: "Argentina vs Egypt | Round of 16 | FIFA World Cup 2026". FIFA. Retrieved July 7, 2026.; "Match Report – Round of 16 – Argentina v. Egypt". FIFA. July 7, 2026. Retrieved July 7, 2026.; "Post match summary report – Round of 16 – Argentina v. Egypt". FIFA. July 7, 2026. Retrieved July 9, 2026.)	Ibrahim 15'; Ziko 67'

Mercedes-Benz Stadium, Atlanta
Attendance: 68,239
Referee: François Letexier (France)

July 7, 2026
1:00 p.m. UTC−7

Switzerland	0–0 (a.e.t.)	Colombia
	(Note: "Switzerland vs Colombia | Round of 16 | FIFA World Cup 2026". FIFA. Retrieved July 7, 2026.; "Match Report – Round of 16 – Switzerland v. Colombia". FIFA. July 7, 2026. Retrieved July 7, 2026.; "Post match summary report – Round of 16 – Switzerland v. Colombia". FIFA. July 7, 2026. Retrieved July 9, 2026.)
Penalties
Xhaka (penalty scored); Amdouni (penalty scored); Akanji (penalty missed); Itten (penalty scored); Vargas (penalty scored)	4–3	(penalty scored) Quintero; (penalty missed) Sánchez; (penalty scored) Campaz; (penalty missed) Hernández; (penalty scored) Díaz

BC Place, Vancouver
Attendance: 52,497
Referee: Iván Barton (El Salvador)

=== Quarterfinals ===
July 9, 2026
4:00 p.m. UTC−4

France	2–0	Morocco
Mbappé 60'; Dembélé 66'	(Note: "France vs Morocco | Quarter-final | FIFA World Cup 2026". FIFA. Retrieved July 9, 2026.; "Match Report – Quarter-final – France v. Morocco". FIFA. July 9, 2026. Retrieved July 9, 2026.; "Post match summary report – Quarter-final – France v. Morocco". FIFA. July 9, 2026. Retrieved July 10, 2026.)

Gillette Stadium, Foxborough
Attendance: 63,811
Referee: Facundo Tello (Argentina)

July 10, 2026
12:00 p.m. UTC−7

Spain	2–1	Belgium
Fabián 30'; Merino 88'	(Note: "Spain vs Belgium | Quarter-final | FIFA World Cup 2026". FIFA. Retrieved July 10, 2026.; "Match Report – Quarter-final – Spain v. Belgium". FIFA. July 10, 2026. Retrieved July 10, 2026.; "Post match summary report – Quarter-final – Spain v. Belgium". FIFA. July 11, 2026. Retrieved July 11, 2026.)	De Ketelaere 41'

SoFi Stadium, Inglewood
Attendance: 70,492
Referee: Michael Oliver (England)

July 11, 2026
5:00 p.m. UTC−4

Norway	1–2 (a.e.t.)	England
Schjelderup 36'	(Note: "Norway vs England | Quarter-final | FIFA World Cup 2026". FIFA. Retrieved July 11, 2026.; "Match Report – Quarter-final – Norway v. England". FIFA. July 11, 2026. Retrieved July 11, 2026.; "Post match summary report – Quarter-final – Norway v. England". FIFA. July 11, 2026. Retrieved July 12, 2026.)	Bellingham 45+2', 93'

Hard Rock Stadium, Miami Gardens
Attendance: 64,478
Referee: Clément Turpin (France)

July 11, 2026
8:00 p.m. UTC−5

Argentina	3–1 (a.e.t.)	Switzerland
Mac Allister 10'; Alvarez 112'; La. Martínez 120+1'	(Note: "Argentina vs Switzerland | Quarter-final | FIFA World Cup 2026". FIFA. Retrieved July 12, 2026.; "Match Report – Quarter-final – Argentina v. Switzerland". FIFA. July 12, 2026. Retrieved July 12, 2026.; "Post match summary report – Quarter-final – Argentina v. Switzerland". FIFA. July 12, 2026. Retrieved July 12, 2026.)	Ndoye 67'

Arrowhead Stadium, Kansas City
Attendance: 69,045
Referee: João Pinheiro (Portugal)

=== Semifinals ===
July 14, 2026
2:00 p.m. UTC−5

France	0–2	Spain
	(Note: "France vs Spain | Semi-final | FIFA World Cup 2026". FIFA. Retrieved July 14, 2026.; "Match Report – Semi-final – France v. Spain". FIFA. July 14, 2026. Retrieved July 14, 2026.; "Post match summary report – Semi-final – France v. Spain". FIFA. July 15, 2026. Retrieved July 15, 2026.)	Oyarzabal 22' (pen.); Porro 58'

AT&T Stadium, Arlington
Attendance: 70,176
Referee: Iván Barton (El Salvador)

July 15, 2026
3:00 p.m. UTC−4

England	1–2	Argentina
Gordon 55'	(Note: "England vs Argentina | Semi-final | FIFA World Cup 2026". FIFA. Retrieved July 15, 2026.; "Match Report – Semi-final – England v. Argentina". FIFA. July 15, 2026. Retrieved July 15, 2026.; "Post match summary report – Semi-final – England v. Argentina". FIFA. July 16, 2026. Retrieved July 16, 2026.)	Fernández 85'; La. Martínez 90+2'

Mercedes-Benz Stadium, Atlanta
Attendance: 68,239
Referee: Ismail Elfath (United States)

=== Match for third place ===
July 18, 2026
5:00 p.m. UTC−4

France	4–6	England
Mbappé 48', 66'; Barcola 54'; Dembélé 90+6'	(Note: "France vs England | Bronze final | FIFA World Cup 2026". FIFA. Retrieved July 15, 2026.; "Match Report – Bronze final – France v. England". FIFA. July 18, 2026. Retrieved July 18, 2026.; "Post match summary report – Bronze final – France v. England". FIFA. July 18, 2026. Retrieved July 19, 2026.)	Rice 3'; Konsa 18'; Saka 37', 45+1', 87' (pen.); Bellingham 90+8'

Hard Rock Stadium, Miami Gardens
Attendance: 64,478
Referee: Jesús Valenzuela (Venezuela)

=== Final ===
July 19, 2026
3:00 p.m. UTC−4

Spain	1–0 (a.e.t.)	Argentina
Torres 106'	(Note: "Spain vs Argentina | Final | FIFA World Cup 2026". FIFA. Retrieved July 19, 2026.; "Match Report – Final – Spain v. Argentina". FIFA. July 19, 2026. Retrieved July 19, 2026.; "Post match summary report – Final – Spain v. Argentina". FIFA. July 20, 2026. Retrieved July 20, 2026.)

MetLife Stadium, East Rutherford
Attendance: 80,663
Referee: Slavko Vinčić (Slovenia)

== Statistics ==
=== Goalscorers ===
There were 308 goals scored in 104 matches, for an average of 2.96 goals per match.

10 goals

- (France national football team) Kylian Mbappé

8 goals

- (Argentina national football team) Lionel Messi

7 goals

- (England national football team) Jude Bellingham
- (Norway national football team) Erling Haaland

6 goals

- (England national football team) Harry Kane
- (France national football team) Ousmane Dembélé

5 goals

- (Spain national football team) Mikel Oyarzabal

4 goals

- (Brazil national football team) Vinícius Júnior
- (Mexico national football team) Julián Quiñones
- (Senegal national football team) Ismaïla Sarr

3 goals

- (Argentina national football team) Lautaro Martínez
- (Belgium national football team) Charles De Ketelaere
- (Belgium national football team) Romelu Lukaku
- (Brazil national football team) Matheus Cunha
- (Canada men's national soccer team) Jonathan David
- (DR Congo national football team) Yoane Wissa
- (England national football team) Bukayo Saka
- (France national football team) Bradley Barcola
- (Germany national football team) Kai Havertz
- (Germany national football team) Deniz Undav
- (Mexico national football team) Raúl Jiménez
- (Morocco national football team) Ismael Saibari
- (Netherlands national football team) Brian Brobbey
- (Netherlands national football team) Cody Gakpo
- (New Zealand men's national football team) Elijah Just
- (Portugal national football team) Cristiano Ronaldo
- (Switzerland national football team) Johan Manzambi
- (United States men's national soccer team) Folarin Balogun

2 goals

- (Algeria national football team) Riyad Mahrez
- (Argentina national football team) Enzo Fernández
- (Austria national football team) Marko Arnautović
- (Belgium national football team) Youri Tielemans
- (Belgium national football team) Leandro Trossard
- (Bosnia and Herzegovina national football team) Ermin Mahmić
- (Canada men's national soccer team) Cyle Larin
- (Colombia national football team) Daniel Muñoz
- (Egypt national football team) Emam Ashour
- (Egypt national football team) Mostafa Ziko
- (Iran national football team) Ramin Rezaeian
- (Ivory Coast national football team) Amad Diallo
- (Ivory Coast national football team) Nicolas Pépé
- (Japan national football team) Daichi Kamada
- (Japan national football team) Ayase Ueda
- (Morocco national football team) Azzedine Ounahi
- (Morocco national football team) Soufiane Rahimi
- (Netherlands national football team) Crysencio Summerville
- (Senegal national football team) Habib Diarra
- (Senegal national football team) Pape Gueye
- (Spain national football team) Mikel Merino
- (Spain national football team) Pedro Porro
- (Sweden men's national football team) Yasin Ayari
- (Sweden men's national football team) Anthony Elanga
- (Switzerland national football team) Breel Embolo
- (Switzerland national football team) Dan Ndoye
- (Switzerland national football team) Rubén Vargas
- (United States men's national soccer team) Malik Tillman
- (Uruguay national football team) Maximiliano Araújo

1 goal

- (Algeria national football team) Rafik Belghali
- (Algeria national football team) Nadhir Benbouali
- (Algeria national football team) Amine Gouiri
- (Argentina national football team) Julián Alvarez
- (Argentina national football team) Giovani Lo Celso
- (Argentina national football team) Alexis Mac Allister
- (Argentina national football team) Lisandro Martínez
- (Argentina national football team) Cristian Romero
- (Australia men's national soccer team) Nestory Irankunda
- (Australia men's national soccer team) Connor Metcalfe
- (Austria national football team) Saša Kalajdžić
- (Austria national football team) Marcel Sabitzer
- (Austria national football team) Romano Schmid
- (Belgium national football team) Kevin De Bruyne
- (Belgium national football team) Alexis Saelemaekers
- (Belgium national football team) Hans Vanaken
- (Bosnia and Herzegovina national football team) Kerim Alajbegović
- (Bosnia and Herzegovina national football team) Jovo Lukić
- (Brazil national football team) Casemiro
- (Brazil national football team) Gabriel Martinelli
- (Brazil national football team) Neymar
- (Canada men's national soccer team) Promise David
- (Canada men's national soccer team) Stephen Eustáquio
- (Canada men's national soccer team) Nathan Saliba
- (Cape Verde national football team) Deroy Duarte
- (Cape Verde national football team) Sidny Lopes Cabral
- (Cape Verde national football team) Kevin Pina
- (Cape Verde national football team) Hélio Varela
- (Colombia national football team) Jhon Arias
- (Colombia national football team) Jaminton Campaz
- (Colombia national football team) Luis Díaz
- (Croatia national football team) Martin Baturina
- (Croatia national football team) Ante Budimir
- (Croatia national football team) Petar Musa
- (Croatia national football team) Ivan Perišić
- (Croatia national football team) Petar Sučić
- (Croatia national football team) Nikola Vlašić
- (Curaçao national football team) Livano Comenencia
- (Czech Republic national football team) Ladislav Krejčí
- (Czech Republic national football team) Michal Sadílek
- (DR Congo national football team) Brian Cipenga
- (DR Congo national football team) Fiston Mayele
- (Ecuador national football team) Nilson Angulo
- (Ecuador national football team) Gonzalo Plata
- (Egypt national football team) Yasser Ibrahim
- (Egypt national football team) Mahmoud Saber
- (Egypt national football team) Mohamed Salah
- (Egypt national football team) Trézéguet
- (England national football team) Anthony Gordon
- (England national football team) Ezri Konsa
- (England national football team) Marcus Rashford
- (England national football team) Declan Rice
- (France national football team) Désiré Doué
- (Germany national football team) Nathaniel Brown
- (Germany national football team) Jamal Musiala
- (Germany national football team) Felix Nmecha
- (Germany national football team) Leroy Sané
- (Germany national football team) Nico Schlotterbeck
- (Ghana national football team) Derrick Luckassen
- (Ghana national football team) Caleb Yirenkyi
- (Haiti national football team) Wilson Isidor
- (Iran national football team) Mohammad Mohebi
- (Iraq national football team) Aymen Hussein
- (Ivory Coast national football team) Franck Kessié
- (Japan national football team) Junya Itō
- (Japan national football team) Daizen Maeda
- (Japan national football team) Keito Nakamura
- (Japan national football team) Kaishū Sano
- (Jordan national football team) Ali Olwan
- (Jordan national football team) Nizar Al-Rashdan
- (Jordan national football team) Musa Al-Taamari
- (Mexico national football team) Mateo Chávez
- (Mexico national football team) Álvaro Fidalgo
- (Mexico national football team) Luis Romo
- (Morocco national football team) Issa Diop
- (Morocco national football team) Achraf Hakimi
- (Morocco national football team) Gessime Yassine
- (Netherlands national football team) Virgil van Dijk
- (Netherlands national football team) Jan Paul van Hecke
- (New Zealand men's national football team) Finn Surman
- (Norway national football team) Thelo Aasgaard
- (Norway national football team) Antonio Nusa
- (Norway national football team) Leo Østigård
- (Norway national football team) Marcus Holmgren Pedersen
- (Norway national football team) Andreas Schjelderup
- (Paraguay national football team) Julio Enciso
- (Paraguay national football team) Matías Galarza
- (Paraguay national football team) Maurício
- (Portugal national football team) Rafael Leão
- (Portugal national football team) Nuno Mendes
- (Portugal national football team) João Neves
- (Portugal national football team) Gonçalo Ramos
- (Qatar national football team) Hassan Al-Haydos
- (Saudi Arabia national football team) Abdulelah Al-Amri
- (Scotland national football team) John McGinn
- (Senegal national football team) Ibrahim Mbaye
- (Senegal national football team) Iliman Ndiaye
- (South Africa national soccer team) Thapelo Maseko
- (South Africa national soccer team) Teboho Mokoena
- (South Korea national football team) Hwang In-beom
- (South Korea national football team) Oh Hyeon-gyu
- (Spain national football team) Álex Baena
- (Spain national football team) Fabián Ruiz
- (Spain national football team) Ferran Torres
- (Spain national football team) Lamine Yamal
- (Sweden men's national football team) Viktor Gyökeres
- (Sweden men's national football team) Alexander Isak
- (Sweden men's national football team) Mattias Svanberg
- (Switzerland national football team) Granit Xhaka
- (Tunisia national football team) Hazem Mastouri
- (Tunisia national football team) Omar Rekik
- (Turkey national football team) Kaan Ayhan
- (Turkey national football team) Arda Güler
- (Turkey national football team) Barış Alper Yılmaz
- (United States men's national soccer team) Sebastian Berhalter
- (United States men's national soccer team) Alex Freeman
- (United States men's national soccer team) Giovanni Reyna
- (United States men's national soccer team) Auston Trusty
- (Uruguay national football team) Agustín Canobbio
- (Uzbekistan national football team) Abbosbek Fayzullaev
- (Uzbekistan national football team) Eldor Shomurodov

1 own goal

- (Australia men's national soccer team) Cameron Burgess (against United States)
- (Cape Verde national football team) Diney (against Argentina)
- (Iraq national football team) Aymen Hussein (against Norway)
- (Jordan national football team) Yazan Al-Arab (against Austria)
- (Morocco national football team) Yassine Bounou (against Haiti)
- (Paraguay national football team) Damián Bobadilla (against United States)
- (Qatar national football team) Mahmud Abunada (against Bosnia and Herzegovina)
- (Qatar national football team) Mohamed Manai (against Canada)
- (Saudi Arabia national football team) Hassan Al-Tambakti (against Spain)
- (Switzerland national football team) Miro Muheim (against Qatar)
- (Tunisia national football team) Ellyes Skhiri (against Netherlands)
- (Uzbekistan national football team) Abduvohid Nematov (against Portugal)

2 own goals

- (Egypt national football team) Mohamed Hany (against Belgium and Australia)

=== Discipline ===
A player or team official was automatically suspended for the next match of the tournament for the following offenses:

- Receiving a red card (red card suspensions could be extended for serious offenses).
- Receiving two yellow cards in the tournament. (Note: As yellow cards were not carried forward to penalty shootouts, players could be shown two yellow cards in the same match without being sent off. However, this would result in a suspension for accumulating two yellow cards during the tournament.) This yellow card count was reset after the completion of the group stage and again after the quarterfinals. Resets did not apply to suspensions; a player whose yellow card count reached two in the match immediately before a reset was still suspended for the next match.

During qualification for the World Cup, Cristiano Ronaldo was sent off for violent conduct in Portugal's penultimate match against the Republic of Ireland, with such an offense typically resulting in a ban of at least two matches. Ronaldo was handed a three-match ban, though the final two matches of the ban were suspended for a one-year probationary period, making him eligible to appear in Portugal's opening World Cup match. On May 8, 2026, the Bureau of the FIFA Council amended the tournament regulations so that pending one- or two-match suspensions resulting from red cards for two yellow cards, denying an obvious goal-scoring opportunity, or serious foul play during qualification would no longer be carried forward to the final competition. This exempted Argentina's Nicolás Otamendi, Ecuador's Moisés Caicedo, and Qatar's Tarek Salman from serving their qualifying-round suspensions during the tournament, with the bans to instead be served in a subsequent competition.

During the round of 32, United States player Folarin Balogun was sent off, and was expected to be banned for the forthcoming round of 16 game against Belgium. Following lobbying from U.S. president Donald Trump, FIFA suspended the ban. The Royal Belgian Football Association, Belgium manager Rudi Garcia, and UEFA were critical of the decision.

Following the full-time whistle in the final, Argentina player Leandro Paredes was involved in altercations with Spain players Eric García and Gavi. While FIFA initially reported a red card for these incidents, the organization later confirmed that Paredes was not punished at the time.

The following suspensions were accumulated during the tournament:

Tournament suspensions for players and team officials
Player	Offense(s)	Suspension(s)
(South Africa national soccer team) Sphephelo Sithole	(red card) in Group A vs Mexico (matchday 1; June 11)	Group A vs Czech Republic (matchday 2; June 18)
(South Africa national soccer team) Themba Zwane	(red card) in Group A vs Mexico (matchday 1; June 11)	Group A vs Czech Republic (matchday 2; June 18); Group A vs South Korea (matchday 3; June 24); Round of 32 vs Canada (June 28)
(Mexico national football team) César Montes	(red card) in Group A vs South Africa (matchday 1; June 11)	Group A vs South Korea (matchday 2; June 18)
(South Africa national soccer team) Teboho Mokoena	(yellow card) in Group A vs Mexico (matchday 1; June 11); (yellow card) in Group A vs Czech Republic (matchday 2; June 18)	Group A vs South Korea (matchday 3; June 24)
(Bosnia and Herzegovina national football team) Tarik Muharemović	(red card) in Group B vs Switzerland (matchday 2; June 18)	Group B vs Qatar (matchday 3; June 24)
(Qatar national football team) Homam Ahmed	(red card) in Group B vs Canada (matchday 2; June 18)	Group B vs Bosnia and Herzegovina (matchday 3; June 24)
(Qatar national football team) Assim Madibo	(red card) in Group B vs Canada (matchday 2; June 18)	Group B vs Bosnia and Herzegovina (matchday 3; June 24); Last 4 matches of suspension to be served outside this tournament
(Paraguay national football team) Miguel Almirón	(red card) in Group D vs Turkey (matchday 2; June 19)	Group D vs Australia (matchday 3; June 25)
(Belgium national football team) Nathan Ngoy	(red card) in Group G vs Iran (matchday 2; June 21)	Group G vs New Zealand (matchday 3; June 26)
(Cape Verde national football team) Sidny Lopes Cabral	(yellow card) in Group H vs Spain (matchday 1; June 15); (yellow card) in Group H vs Uruguay (matchday 2; June 21)	Group H vs Saudi Arabia (matchday 3; June 26)
(Paraguay national football team) Diego Gómez	(yellow card) in Group D vs United States (matchday 1; June 12); (yellow card) in Group D vs Australia (matchday 3; June 25)	Round of 32 vs Germany (June 29)
(Iraq national football team) Rebin Sulaka	(red card) in Group I vs Senegal (matchday 3; June 26)	Suspension served outside this tournament
(Uruguay national football team) Agustín Canobbio	(red card) in Group H vs Spain (matchday 3; June 26)	Suspension to be served outside this tournament
(Egypt national football team) Mohanad Lasheen	(yellow card) in Group G vs New Zealand (matchday 2; June 21); (yellow card) in Group G vs Iran (matchday 3; June 26)	Round of 32 vs Australia (July 3)
(Ecuador national football team) Piero Hincapié	(red card) in Round of 32 vs Mexico (June 30)	Suspension to be served outside this tournament
(United States men's national soccer team) Folarin Balogun	(red card) in Round of 32 vs Bosnia and Herzegovina (July 1)	Ban suspended
(England national football team) Jarell Quansah	(red card) in Round of 16 vs Mexico (July 5)	Quarterfinals vs Norway (July 11); Semifinals vs Argentina (July 15)
(Egypt national football team) Saafan El-Sagheer (goalkeeping coach)	(red card) in Round of 16 vs Argentina (July 7)	Suspension to be served outside this tournament
(Switzerland national football team) Breel Embolo	(yellow card) (yellow-red card) in Quarterfinals vs Argentina (July 11)	Suspension to be served outside this tournament
(Argentina national football team) Enzo Fernández	(yellow card) (yellow-red card) in Final vs Spain (July 19)	Suspension to be served outside this tournament

=== Tournament ranking ===
Per statistical convention in soccer, matches decided in extra time are counted as wins and losses, while matches decided by penalty shootouts are counted as draws.

Pos	Grp	Team	Pld	W	D	L	GF	GA	GD	Pts	Final result
1	H	Spain	8	7	1	0	14	1	+13	22	Champion
2	J	Argentina	8	7	0	1	19	8	+11	21	Runner-up
3	L	England	8	6	1	1	20	12	+8	19	Third place
4	I	France	8	6	0	2	20	10	+10	18	Fourth place
5	I	Norway	6	4	0	2	13	11	+2	12	Eliminated in quarterfinals
6	G	Belgium	6	3	2	1	14	7	+7	11	Eliminated in quarterfinals
=7	C	Morocco	6	3	2	1	10	6	+4	11	Eliminated in quarterfinals
=7	B	Switzerland	6	3	2	1	10	6	+4	11	Eliminated in quarterfinals
9	A	Mexico (H)	5	4	0	1	10	3	+7	12	Eliminated in round of 16
10	K	Colombia	5	3	2	0	5	1	+4	11	Eliminated in round of 16
11	C	Brazil	5	3	1	1	10	4	+6	10	Eliminated in round of 16
12	D	United States (H)	5	3	0	2	11	8	+3	9	Eliminated in round of 16
13	K	Portugal	5	2	2	1	8	3	+5	8	Eliminated in round of 16
14	B	Canada (H)	5	2	1	2	9	6	+3	7	Eliminated in round of 16
15	G	Egypt	5	1	3	1	8	7	+1	6	Eliminated in round of 16
16	D	Paraguay	5	1	2	2	3	6	−3	5	Eliminated in round of 16
17	F	Netherlands	4	2	2	0	11	5	+6	8	Eliminated in round of 32
18	E	Germany	4	2	1	1	11	5	+6	7	Eliminated in round of 32
19	E	Ivory Coast	4	2	0	2	5	4	+1	6	Eliminated in round of 32
20	L	Croatia	4	2	0	2	6	7	−1	6	Eliminated in round of 32
21	F	Japan	4	1	2	1	8	5	+3	5	Eliminated in round of 32
22	D	Australia	4	1	2	1	3	3	0	5	Eliminated in round of 32
23	K	DR Congo	4	1	1	2	5	5	0	4	Eliminated in round of 32
24	L	Ghana	4	1	1	2	2	3	−1	4	Eliminated in round of 32
=25	E	Ecuador	4	1	1	2	2	4	−2	4	Eliminated in round of 32
=25	A	South Africa	4	1	1	2	2	4	−2	4	Eliminated in round of 32
27	F	Sweden	4	1	1	2	7	10	−3	4	Eliminated in round of 32
28	J	Austria	4	1	1	2	6	9	−3	4	Eliminated in round of 32
29	B	Bosnia and Herzegovina	4	1	1	2	5	8	−3	4	Eliminated in round of 32
30	J	Algeria	4	1	1	2	5	9	−4	4	Eliminated in round of 32
31	I	Senegal	4	1	0	3	10	9	+1	3	Eliminated in round of 32
32	H	Cape Verde	4	0	3	1	4	5	−1	3	Eliminated in round of 32
33	G	Iran	3	0	3	0	3	3	0	3	Eliminated in group stage
34	A	South Korea	3	1	0	2	2	3	−1	3	Eliminated in group stage
35	D	Turkey	3	1	0	2	3	5	−2	3	Eliminated in group stage
36	C	Scotland	3	1	0	2	1	4	−3	3	Eliminated in group stage
37	H	Uruguay	3	0	2	1	3	4	−1	2	Eliminated in group stage
38	H	Saudi Arabia	3	0	2	1	1	5	−4	2	Eliminated in group stage
39	A	Czech Republic	3	0	1	2	2	6	−4	1	Eliminated in group stage
40	G	New Zealand	3	0	1	2	4	10	−6	1	Eliminated in group stage
41	B	Qatar	3	0	1	2	2	10	−8	1	Eliminated in group stage
42	E	Curaçao	3	0	1	2	1	9	−8	1	Eliminated in group stage
43	L	Panama	3	0	0	3	0	4	−4	0	Eliminated in group stage
44	J	Jordan	3	0	0	3	3	8	−5	0	Eliminated in group stage
45	C	Haiti	3	0	0	3	2	8	−6	0	Eliminated in group stage
46	K	Uzbekistan	3	0	0	3	2	11	−9	0	Eliminated in group stage
47	F	Tunisia	3	0	0	3	2	12	−10	0	Eliminated in group stage
48	I	Iraq	3	0	0	3	1	12	−11	0	Eliminated in group stage

Source: FIFA
(H) Hosts

=== Prize money ===
In April 2026, FIFA confirmed the prizes for all participating nations. The total distribution of prize money for the expanded tournament was $871 million, nearly double the amount from the 2022 World Cup. Of this total, $671 million was allocated for performance-based prizes, with the remaining $200 million paid out among teams regardless of performance. Each qualified team received preparation money in the amount of $2.5 million; a team that was eliminated in the group stage would receive a minimum total amount $12.5 million at the tournament, with the winner receiving a total of $52.5 million.

Performance-based prize money
Place	Teams	Amount (in millions)	
Place	Teams	Per team	Total
Champion	1	$50	$50
Runner-up	1	$33	$33
Third place	1	$29	$29
Fourth place	1	$27	$27
5th–8th place (quarterfinals)	4	$19	$76
9th–16th place (round of 16)	8	$15	$120
17th–32nd place (round of 32)	16	$11	$176
33rd–48th place (group stage)	16	$10	$160
Total	48	$671	

== Awards ==
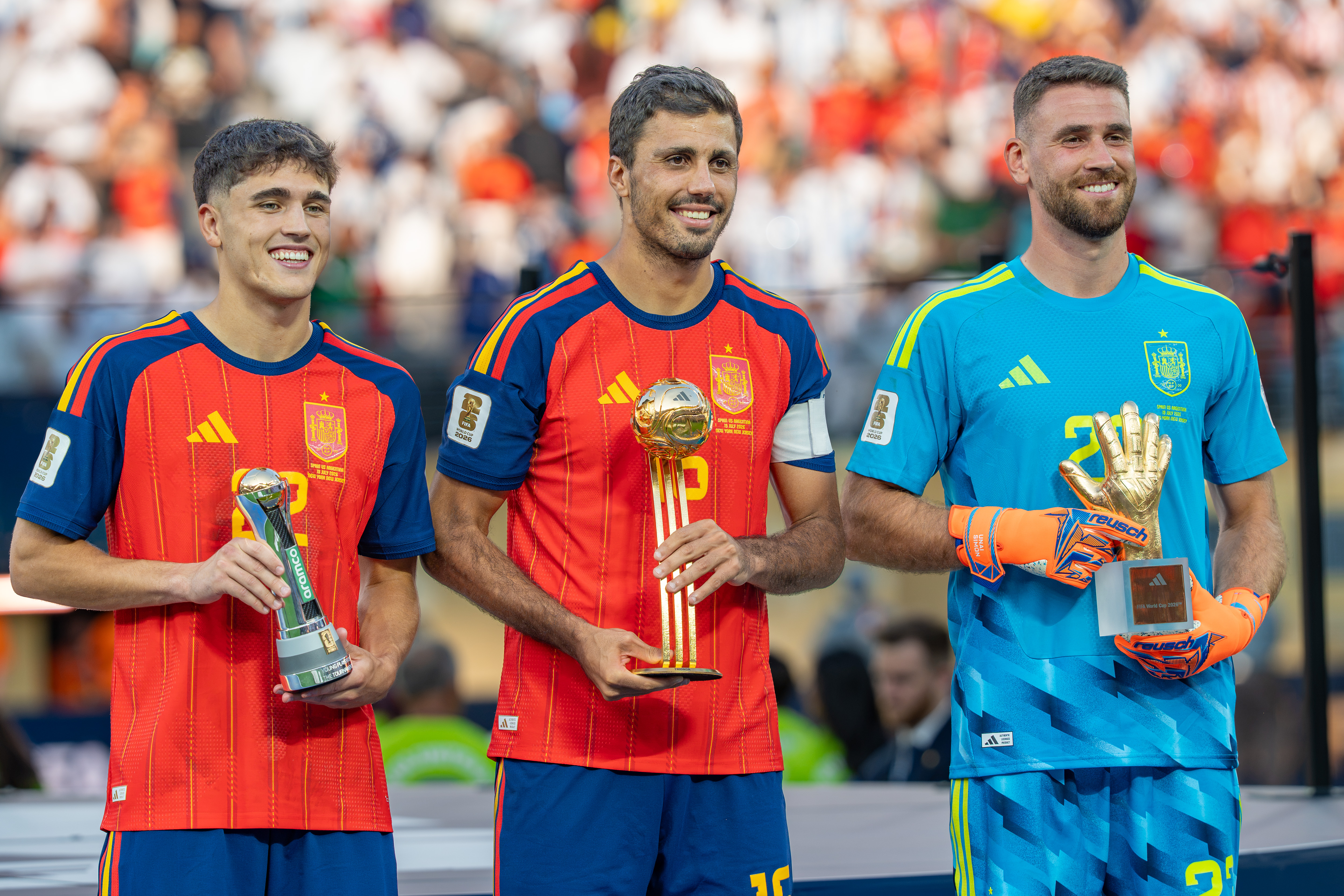
Left to right: Young Player Award winner Pau Cubarsí, Golden Ball winner Rodri, and Golden Glove winner Unai Simón.

The following awards were presented at the end of the tournament.

- Golden Ball: Awarded to the best overall player of the tournament.
- Golden Boot: Awarded to the tournament's top goal scorer.
- Golden Glove: Awarded to the tournament's best goalkeeper.
- FIFA Young Player Award: Awarded to the best overall player of the tournament born on or after January 1, 2005 (aged 21 or under).
- FIFA Fair Play Trophy: Awarded to the team with the best disciplinary record that reached the knockout stage.

Golden Ball	Silver Ball	Bronze Ball
(Spain national football team) Rodri	(Argentina national football team) Lionel Messi	(France national football team) Kylian Mbappé
Golden Boot	Silver Boot	Bronze Boot
(France national football team) Kylian Mbappé 10 goals, 4 assists, 769 minutes played	(Argentina national football team) Lionel Messi 8 goals, 4 assists, 853 minutes played	(England national football team) Jude Bellingham 7 goals, 1 assist, 698 minutes played
Golden Glove
(Spain national football team) Unai Simón
FIFA Young Player Award
(Spain national football team) Pau Cubarsí
FIFA Fair Play Trophy
Netherlands

FIFA.com shortlisted 12 goals for users to vote on as the goal of the tournament. The award was won by Cape Verde's Sidny Lopes Cabral for his equalizing goal in extra time during the round of 32 match against Argentina.

Additionally, a "Superior Player of the Match" award was presented after each game to the player who delivered the most outstanding performance in, and had the greatest impact on, that match, as decided by a public online vote conducted by FIFA. The award was sponsored by Michelob Ultra. Muslim players, such as Mohamed Salah and Lamine Yamal, received a brandless trophy, out of respect for Islam's views on alcohol.

Outside of the FIFA awards, Messi was named the tournament's best player by the International Federation of Football History and Statistics (IFFHS), who cited his eight goals and four assists across seven appearances as the basis for the distinction.

=== Team of the Tournament ===
FIFA also invited users of FIFA.com to elect their Dream XI.

Goalkeeper	Defenders	Midfielders	Forwards
(Cape Verde) Vozinha	(Spain) Marc Cucurella (Argentina) Lisandro Martínez (France) Dayot Upamecano (Spain) Pedro Porro	(England) Jude Bellingham (Spain) Rodri (France) Michael Olise	(France) Kylian Mbappé (Norway) Erling Haaland (Argentina) Lionel Messi

== Marketing ==
=== Branding ===
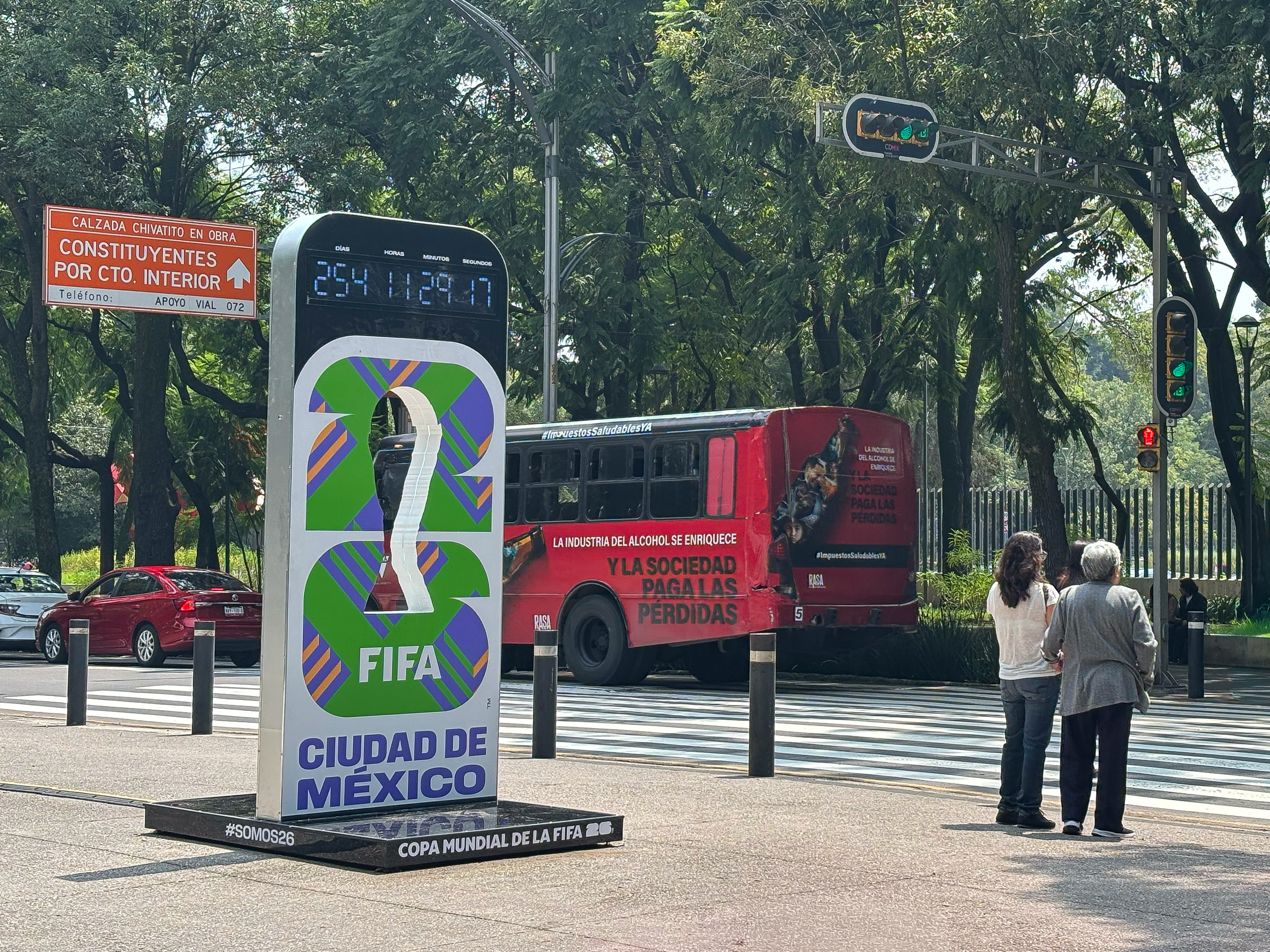
Countdown clock on Paseo de la Reforma, Mexico City in September 2025

The official logo and brand identity of the tournament was unveiled on May 17, 2023, at the Griffith Observatory in Los Angeles, California. The logo's basic form consisted of a stacked "26" with an image of the FIFA World Cup Trophy in front of it. This was the first time that the trophy was depicted in a World Cup emblem as a photo, as opposed to a stylized representation. Initial reactions to the logo were largely negative, with many saying that the design felt unfinished or uncreative compared to the stylistic logos of past FIFA World Cup tournaments. The next day, FIFA unveiled brand identities for each host city, which incorporated designs that reflected local landscapes or culture.

Official poster

In March and April 2025, FIFA unveiled a set of 16 posters representing each of the 2026 World Cup host cities. The posters, designed by local artists, were intended to reflect the "distinct identity and heritage" of each city. On March 3, 2026, the official poster for the tournament was unveiled. It was created by Carson Ting of Canada, Minerva GM of Mexico, and Hank Willis Thomas of the United States.

=== Broadcasting rights ===
On February 12, 2015, FIFA renewed the United States and Canadian broadcasting rights contracts for Fox Sports (U.S. English), Telemundo Deportes (U.S. Spanish), and Bell Media (Canada) to cover the 2026 World Cup, without accepting any other bids. A report in The New York Times asserted that this extension was intended as compensation for the rescheduling of the 2022 World Cup to November–December rather than its traditional June–July scheduling, as it created considerable conflicts with major professional sports leagues that were normally in their offseasons during the World Cup.

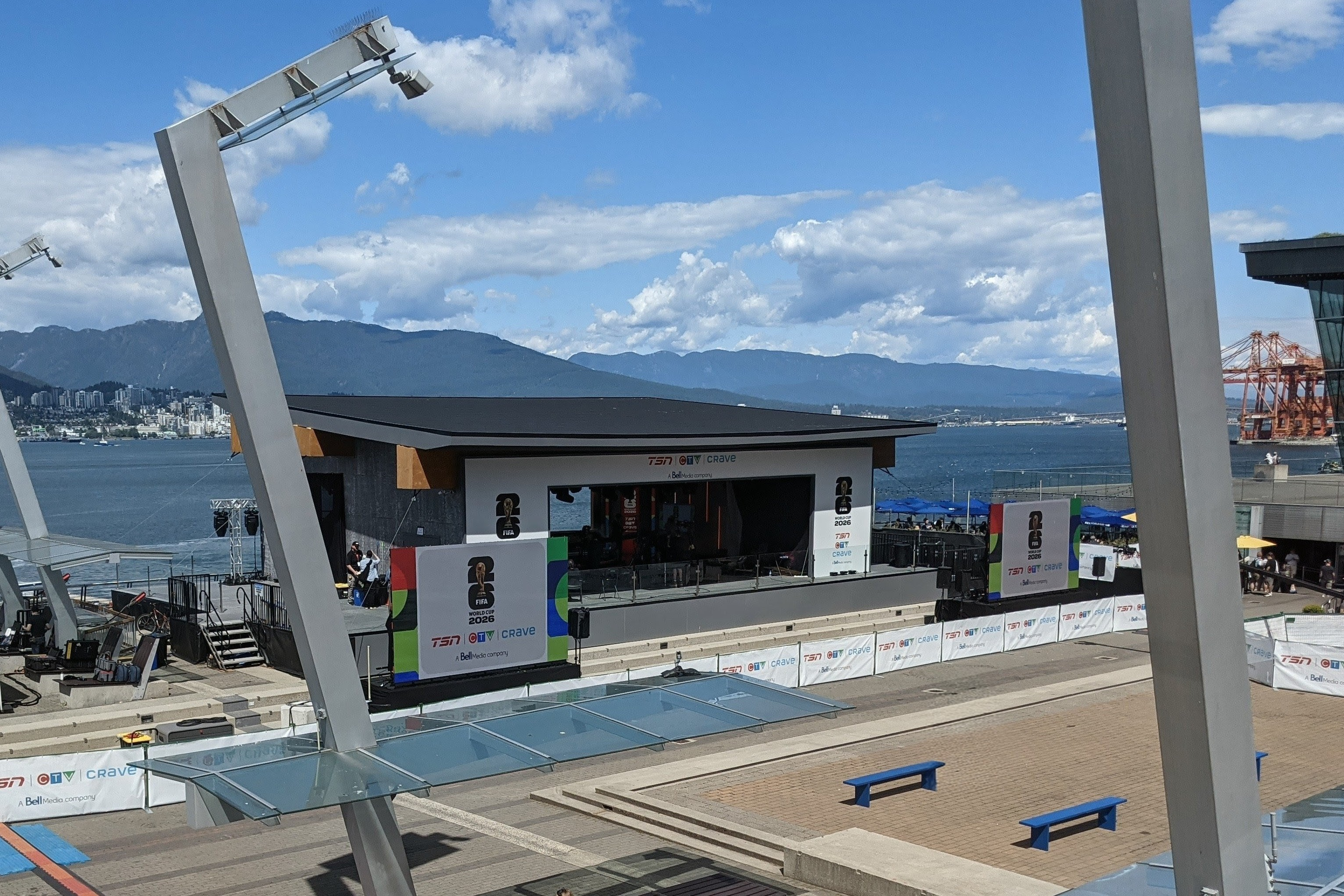
Bell Media broadcast studio located at Jack Poole Plaza in Vancouver. TSN was the primary broadcaster, while select matches were on CTV and Crave in Canada.

The International Broadcast Center (IBC) was located at the Kay Bailey Hutchison Convention Center in Dallas. Bell Media constructed a broadcast studio at Jack Poole Plaza in Vancouver for the tournament (mirroring an arrangement used by Fox during the 2015 FIFA Women's World Cup), which originated TSN/CTV's coverage from June 11 through July 7 (the final match played in the city).

On January 8, 2026, FIFA signed a deal to make TikTok a "preferred platform" for World Cup video content. As part of the agreement, broadcasters could stream parts of matches at a dedicated hub on the TikTok app. FIFA then made a similar "preferred platform" deal with YouTube on March 17, allowing broadcasters to stream select matches in full on their respective YouTube channels, as well as stream the first 10 minutes of every match on the platform as "an appetizer encouraging young fans then to watch on traditional channels".

A number of internet content creators were also involved in coverage of the tournament; in Brazil, Casimiro Miguel's CazéTV renewed its digital rights to the World Cup in Brazil, streaming all matches on its YouTube channel. American influencer IShowSpeed conducted streams from matches during the tournament, and later reached an agreement with Fox Sports to offer altcasts of selected matches on Fox One and its YouTube channel featuring his streams combined with the Fox telecasts.

=== Sponsorships ===
FIFA-level sponsorship tiers included partners, sponsors, and supporters. There were also regional supporters by geography.

=== Advertising ===
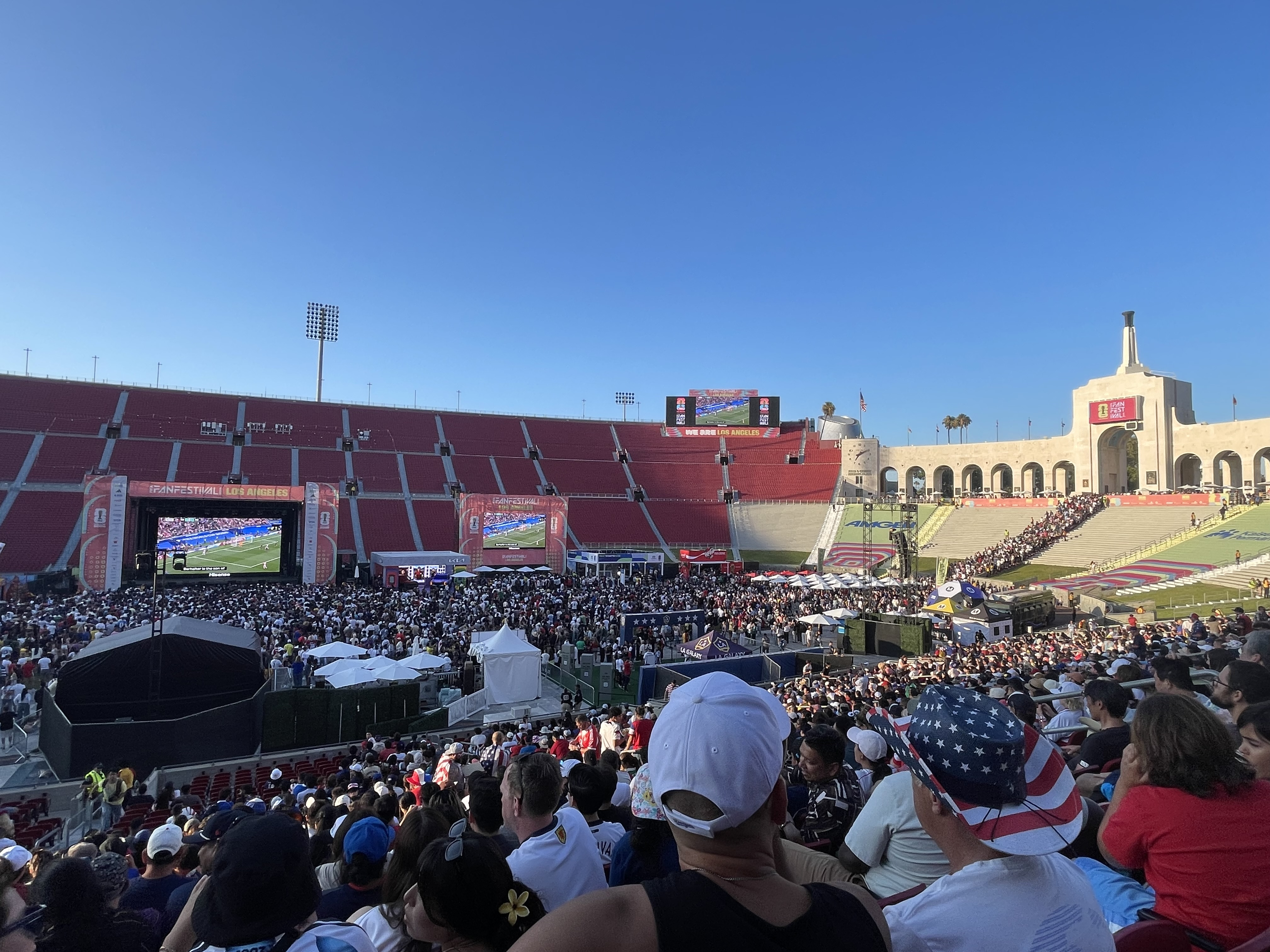
Fan Festival at the Los Angeles Memorial Coliseum during the U.S. team's first match of the tournament.

On May 7, 2026, Adidas released Backyard Legends: The Greatest Football Story Ever Told, a 5-minute short film. On June 4, 2026, Nike released Rip the Script, a 6-minute short film.

=== FIFA fan festivals ===
FIFA staged fan festivals in cities across the host nations, featuring matches on giant screens and live entertainment. Among the fan fest locations were Liberty State Park in Jersey City, the National World War I Museum and Memorial in Kansas City, Missouri, Fairmount Park in Philadelphia, Fort York and The Bentway in Toronto, Centennial Olympic Park in Atlanta, East Downtown Houston, and the Pacific National Exhibition in Vancouver, Canada.

=== Tickets ===
Ticket prices for the 2026 FIFA World Cup initially ranged from $60 for group stage matches to $6,730 for the final—an increase from the USD equivalent of $69 to $1,607 for the 2022 World Cup. However, in September 2025, FIFA confirmed it would use dynamic pricing for tickets for the first time, following the practice used in the 2025 FIFA Club World Cup. Special "hospitality" seats were made available in April 2025.

An initial draw period for non-hospitality seats occurred between September 10–19, 2025, limited to Visa cardholders. A second phase ran from October 27–31, 2025, and a third phase started after the final draw of teams on December 5. Sales were capped at four tickets per person per match, and no person was able to purchase more than 40 tickets for the overall tournament. FIFA's official resale platform went live on October 2, 2025.

A final "last-minute" sales phase reopened on April 22, 2026, approximately 50 days before the start of the tournament, with tickets for all 104 matches made available on a first-come, first-served basis. By that stage, more than five million tickets had been sold from an expected total exceeding six million, with additional tickets scheduled to be released in phases up to the final, subject to availability. Every city hosting the World Cup in the United States passed a law stating that ticket sales to World Cup events were exempt from state and local sales taxes. (Note: Attributed to multiple references:)

=== Attendance ===
The tournament set the record for the highest cumulative attendance in World Cup history, with a total of 6,810,966 spectators. On June 25, during the Group E match between Ecuador and Germany at MetLife Stadium, total attendance reached 3,605,357 spectators. This surpassed the previous record of 3,587,538, which had been held for 32 years by the 1994 FIFA World Cup, also hosted in the United States. The record was broken with 44 matches remaining in the tournament. Across the first 60 matches, venues operated at an average occupancy rate of 99.7%. Additionally, a single-day World Cup attendance record was established on June 16, 2026, when 281,223 fans attended four group stage matches.

=== Merchandise ===
==== Video games ====
On October 2, 2025, FIFA announced the video game FIFA Heroes, scheduled for release in 2026 on Android, iOS, Nintendo Switch, PlayStation, and Xbox platforms.

In May 2026, the Football Manager 26 video game also announced the addition of licensed 2026 FIFA World Cup content.

In December 2025, Netflix announced a new simulation-type game featuring the World Cup, produced by Delphi Interactive and Refactor Games. In May 2026, it was announced the Netflix-published game would be titled FIFA World Cup: Launch Edition; it was released in June 2026.

In the same May 2026 announcement, FIFA also confirmed that they would adopt a non-exclusive "Digital Football" ecosystem, with games of various genres adopting the FIFA license. Alongside the new World Cup game were FIFA Heroes, FIFA Rivals, FIFA Super Soccer, Football Manager, eFootball and Rocket League, with more games joining the ecosystem in the following months.

==== Other products ====
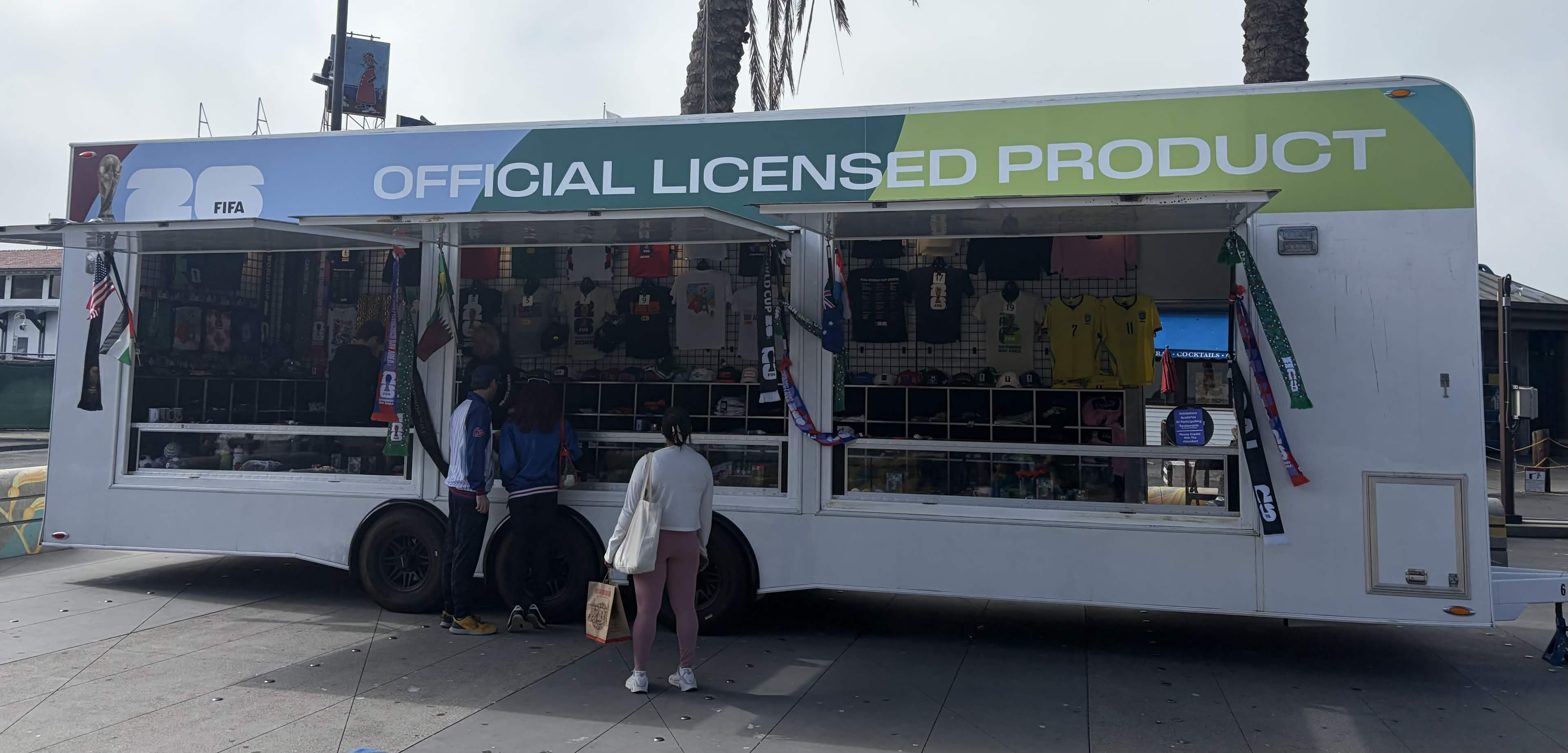
A pop-up truck selling FIFA 2026 merchandise at Fisherman's Wharf, San Francisco

Panini sticker albums were again announced for the 2026 World Cup. Due to the expansion of the tournament, each pack now contained seven stickers as opposed to the usual five. In the United States and Canada, a set of twelve stickers was reserved for stickers that could only be obtained from Coca-Cola bottles, with each bottle containing a sticker printed inside the label. In May 2026, it was announced that the 2026 World Cup would be Panini's second-to-last tournament with a sticker album, after FIFA announced that Fanatics (via their Topps brand) would distribute collectables for FIFA tournaments from 2031.

In conjunction with the tournament, the Lego Group released a series of officially licensed FIFA World Cup 2026-themed construction sets. The collection included models of the FIFA World Cup Trophy, the official tournament emblem, a brick-built Adidas Trionda soccer ball containing a miniature stadium, and player-focused sets based on soccer players Cristiano Ronaldo, Lionel Messi, Kylian Mbappé, and Vinícius Júnior. Several sets featured hidden references to the players' careers, alternative display poses, and commemorative World Cup-themed designs. To promote the product line, Lego organized FIFA World Cup 2026-themed activations in several markets, including a soccer festival and pop-up experience in Singapore. The events featured interactive soccer challenges, soccer-themed Lego builds, displays of player-inspired models, and promotional giveaways tied to the World Cup collection.

== Symbols ==
=== Mascots ===
The tournament mascots: Maple the Moose, Zayu the Jaguar, and Clutch the Bald Eagle

The official mascots of the tournament were revealed on September 25, 2025, and are Maple, Zayu and Clutch. Maple is a moose, Zayu is a jaguar, and Clutch is a bald eagle, representing Canada, Mexico, and the United States, respectively. They were designed to reflect the cultural heritage of their respective countries.

=== Match ball ===
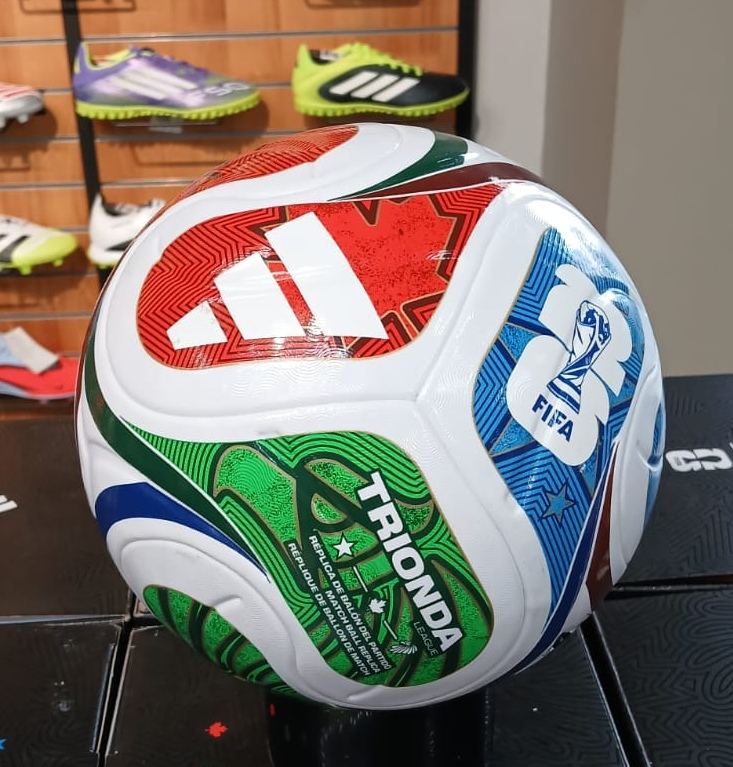
Adidas Trionda, the match ball

On May 2, 2025, reports surfaced that the match ball would be called the "Adidas Trionda". The design features red, green, and blue (the three colors representing Canada, Mexico, and the United States, respectively, and also featured on the host countries' flags), as well as a white wave connecting each of the colors, hence the name using the Spanish words for three (tri) and wave (onda). The design also features the national symbols of the three host countries (a maple leaf for Canada, a golden eagle for Mexico, and a five-pointed star for the United States) as well as gold embellishments to represent the World Cup Trophy. Later it was officially announced by Adidas on October 2, 2025.

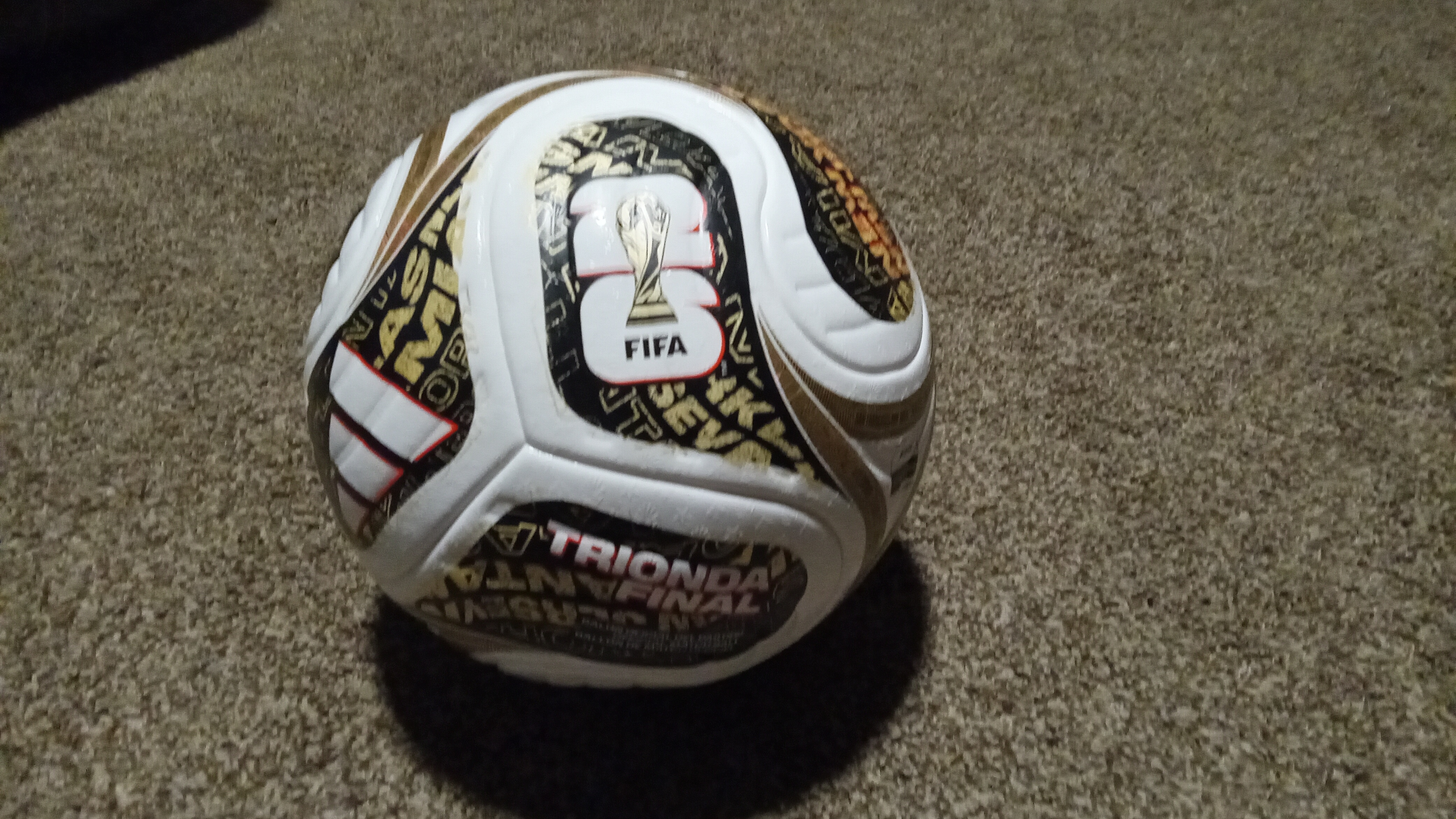
Adidas Trionda Final, used from the semifinals onwards.

On June 11, 2026, and in preparation for the 2026 FIFA World Cup, NASA conducted experiments aboard the International Space Station using soccer balls to study how mass distribution and embedded sensor technology affect ball motion and stability in microgravity. According to NASA, the research contributed to the development and evaluation of technologies used in the 2026 FIFA World Cup official match ball. The Trionda Final was announced by Adidas on July 6, 2026, as the official match ball to be used for the semifinals, match for third place, and final. It features a gold, black, and red color scheme, with the host cities' names printed on it.

=== Music ===
The tournament's official instrumental theme music was composed by Zachary Aaron Golden. Throughout March 2025, FIFA released remixes of the theme for each host city by local producers.

The first single from the official soundtrack album, "Lighter" by American country rap performer Jelly Roll and Mexican singer Carín León, was released on March 20, 2026; the song garnered a mixed reception from listeners and critics, with some having falsely assumed that it was meant to be the tournament's official song.

The official song "Dai Dai" by Colombian singer Shakira and Nigerian singer Burna Boy was released on May 15, 2026, followed by the official album on June 5, 2026. The official anthem "DNA (More Than a Game)" by French producer David Guetta, featuring Italian tenor Andrea Bocelli, South Korean-American singer Ejae, and American rapper Megan Thee Stallion was released on June 10, 2026.

Instrumental song "Sirius" by British rock band the Alan Parsons Project, known for having been played at Chicago Bulls home games since 1984, was used as the theme song for the entrances of the national teams before each match during the first matchday of the group stage. For all subsequent matches, a special walkout remix of "Dai Dai" was used. "DNA (More Than a Game)" and "Titanium (David Guetta and Morten Remix)" were played after the national anthems and before the kickoff.

== Controversies ==
The tournament was accompanied by a number of controversies relating to political, logistical, environmental, and human rights issues, particularly over the United States' immigration and visa policies affecting teams and fans, Iran's participation amid the conflict during the tournament, security concerns surrounding drug cartel violence in Mexico, FIFA's use of dynamic ticket pricing, the revoking of American Folarin Balogun's one match suspension following a red card, the application of the new rules and technology, and various other issues.

== See also ==
- 2025 FIFA Club World Cup
- 2026 FIFA U-17 World Cup
- 2026 FIFA Intercontinental Cup
- 2026 FIFA Series
- 2027 FIFA Women's World Cup
