= Pass deflected =

Incomplete pass that is caused by a defensive player

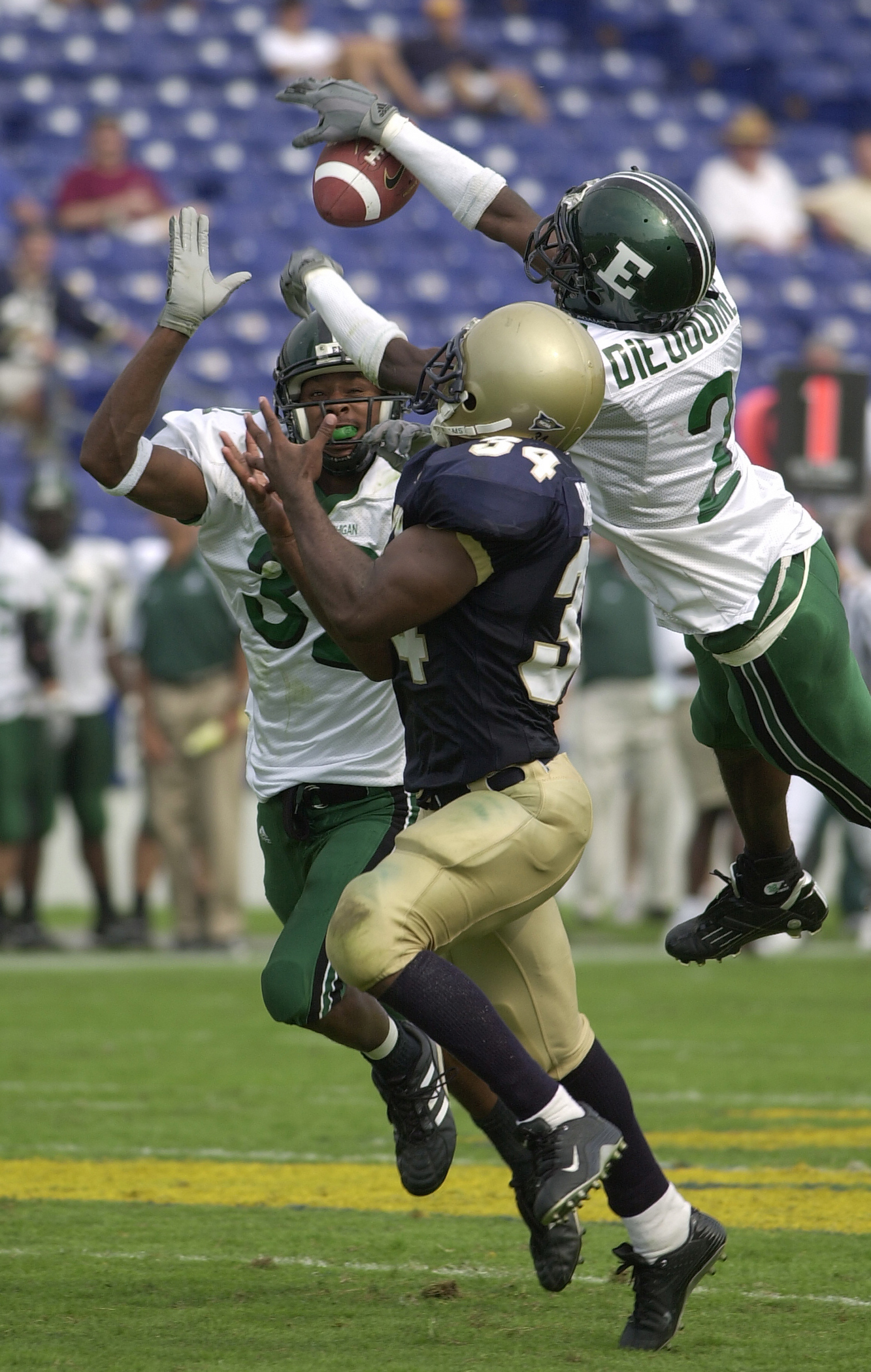
Yves Dieudonne of Eastern Michigan breaks up a pass during a college football game in 2003.

In gridiron football, a pass deflected, also known as a pass deflection, a pass defended, a pass defensed, a pass knockdown, or a pass breakup, is an incomplete pass that is caused by a defensive player. This is done by slapping or blocking the ball with a hand or part of the arm, knocking the ball to the ground. It can also be done by aggressively hitting the receiver at the exact moment he first makes contact with the ball, or shortly thereafter, jarring the ball loose. If the defender hits the receiver before the latter first makes contact with the ball, it is pass interference.
