= Index of basketball-related articles =

Basketball is a team sport in which two teams of five players try to score points by throwing or "shooting" a ball through the top of a basketball hoop while following a set of rules. Basketball is one of the most popular and widely viewed sports in the world.

Following is an alphabetical index of basketball articles:

== 0–9 ==
- 1-3-1 defense/offense
- 1946–47 BAA season
- 1947–48 BAA season
- 1948–49 BAA season
- 1949–50 NBA season
- 1950–51 NBA season
- 1951–52 NBA season
- 1952–53 NBA season
- 1953–54 NBA season
- 1954–55 NBA season
- 1955–56 NBA season
- 1956–57 NBA season
- 1957–58 NBA season
- 1958–59 NBA season
- 1959–60 NBA season
- 1960–61 NBA season
- 1961–62 NBA season
- 1962–63 NBA season
- 1963–64 NBA season
- 1964–65 NBA season
- 1965–66 NBA season
- 1966–67 NBA season
- 1967–68 NBA season
- 1968–69 NBA season
- 1969–70 NBA season
- 1970–71 NBA season
- 1971–72 NBA season
- 1972–73 NBA season
- 1973–74 NBA season
- 1974–75 NBA season
- 1975–76 NBA season
- 1976–77 NBA season
- 1977–78 NBA season
- 1978–79 NBA season
- 1979–80 NBA season
- 1980–81 NBA season
- 1981–82 NBA season
- 1982–83 NBA season
- 1983–84 NBA season
- 1984–85 NBA season
- 1985–86 NBA season
- 1986–87 NBA season
- 1987–88 NBA season
- 1988–89 NBA season
- 1989–90 NBA season
- 1990–91 NBA season
- 1991–92 NBA season
- 1992–93 NBA season
- 1993–94 NBA season
- 1994–95 NBA season
- 1995–96 NBA season
- 1996–97 NBA season
- 1997–98 NBA season
- 1998–99 NBA season
- 1999–2000 NBA season
- 2-3 zone defense
- 2000–01 NBA season
- 2001–02 NBA season
- 2002–03 NBA season
- 2003–04 NBA season
- 2004–05 NBA season
- 2005–06 NBA season
- 2006–07 NBA season
- 2007–08 NBA season
- 2008–09 NBA season
- 2009–10 NBA season
- 2010–11 NBA season
- 2010 IHSAA Boys Basketball Championship
- 2011–12 NBA season
- 2012–13 NBA season
- 2013–14 NBA season
- 2014–15 NBA season
- 2015–16 NBA season
- 2016–17 NBA season
- 2017–18 NBA season
- 2018–19 NBA season
- 2019–20 NBA season
- 2020–21 NBA season
- 2021–22 NBA season
- 2022–23 NBA season
- 2023–24 NBA season
- 3x3 basketball
- 3 point line
- 5 man weave

== A ==
- Kareem Abdul-Jabbar
- Air ball
- All-Pro Basketball
- Alley-oop
- Giannis Antetokounmpo
- Arcade Hoops Basketball
- Arch Rivals
- Assist
- Geno Auriemma

== B ==
- Back screen
- Backboard
- Backboard shattering
- Ball game
- Ball hog
- Charles Barkley
- Barkley Shut Up and Jam!
- Basket Master
- Basket interference
- Basketball
- Basketball (1978 video game)
- Basketball (1980 video game)
- Basketball (ball)
- Basketball Association of America
- Basketball at the Summer Olympics
- Basketball Bundesliga
- Basketball Challenge
- Basketball Champions League
- Basketball court
- Basketball hoop
- Basketball moves
- Basketball Nightmare
- Basketball position
- Basketball sleeve
- Basketbrawl
- Beach Basketball
- Bill Laimbeer's Combat Basketball
- Larry Bird
- Sue Bird
- Block
- Block out
- Bonus
- Box-and-one defense
- Box out
- Box score
- Box set
- Breakaway rim
- British Basketball League
- Kobe Bryant
- Buzzer beater

== C ==
- Caitlin Clark effect
- Pete Carril
- Carrying
- Center
- Wilt Chamberlain
- Caitlin Clark
- Clark–Reese rivalry
- Coach
- College basketball
- Combo guard
- Continental Basketball Association
- Continuity offense
- Cornerman
- Crossover dribble
- Stephen Curry

== D ==
- David Robinson's Supreme Court
- Deaf basketball
- Disabled sports
- Disney Sports Basketball
- Division I
- Donkey basketball
- Double-double
- Double Dribble: The Playoff Edition
- Double Dribble
- Double Dunk
- Double dribble
- Dribble
- Dribble drive motion
- Dribbling

== E ==
- EuroGames
- EuroLeague
- Euroleague Basketball
- EuroLeague Women
- EuroCup Basketball
- EuroCup Women

== F ==
- Fantasy basketball
- Fast break
- FIBA
- FIBA Men's World Cup
- FIBA Women's World Cup
- Field goal
- Finger sleeve
- Five-second rule
- Flagrant foul
- Flex offense
- Fly fast break
- Forward-center
- Foul
- Four-point play
- Four corners offense
- Franklin Cappon
- FreeStyle Street Basketball
- Free throw

== G ==
- GBA Championship Basketball: Two-on-Two
- Gay Games
- Goaltending
- Golden Basket

== H ==
- Hack-a-Shaq
- Halftime
- Tim Hardaway
- Harlem Globetrotters
- Harlem Globetrotters (video game)
- History of basketball
- HoopWorld
- Hoops (video game)
- Horseball
- Hot hand fallacy

== I ==
- Allen Iverson

== J ==
- LeBron James
- Jammit
- Nikola Jokić
- Magic Johnson
- Jordan Rules
- Jordan vs. Bird: One on One
- Michael Jordan
- Jump ball
- Jump shot

== K ==
- Key
- Jason Kidd
- Kidz Sports Basketball
- Korfball

== L ==
- Layup
- Liga ACB
- List of Atlanta Hawks seasons
- List of Boston Celtics seasons
- List of Charlotte Bobcats seasons
- List of Chicago Bulls seasons
- List of Cleveland Cavaliers seasons
- List of Dallas Mavericks seasons
- List of Denver Nuggets seasons
- List of Detroit Pistons seasons
- List of Golden State Warriors seasons
- List of Houston Rockets seasons
- List of Indiana Pacers seasons
- List of Los Angeles Clippers seasons
- List of Los Angeles Lakers seasons
- List of Memphis Grizzlies seasons
- List of Miami Heat seasons
- List of Milwaukee Bucks seasons
- List of Minnesota Timberwolves seasons
- List of National Basketball Association seasons
- List of NBA franchise post-season droughts
- List of NBA franchise post-season streaks
- List of New Jersey Nets seasons
- List of New Orleans Pelicans seasons
- List of New York Knicks seasons
- List of Oklahoma City Thunder seasons
- List of Orlando Magic seasons
- List of Philadelphia 76ers seasons
- List of Phoenix Suns seasons
- List of Portland Trail Blazers seasons
- List of Sacramento Kings seasons
- List of San Antonio Spurs seasons
- List of Toronto Raptors seasons
- List of Utah Jazz seasons
- List of Washington Wizards seasons
- Looney Tunes B-Ball
- Luka Dončić–Anthony Davis trade

== M ==
- Magic Johnson's Basketball
- Man-to-man defense
- Pete Maravich
- Mario Hoops 3-on-3
- Memphis Attack
- Memphis Tigers basketball (disambiguation)
- Mesoamerican ballgame
- Michael Jordan in Flight
- Midnight basketball
- Earl Monroe
- Motion offense

== N ==
- James Naismith
- Steve Nash
- NBA Elite series
- NBA Give 'n Go
- NBA Jam
- NBA in the Zone
- NCAA Division I men's basketball tournament
- NCAA Division I women's basketball tournament
- National Basketball Association
- National Basketball League (Australia)
- NBA Finals
- National Collegiate Athletic Association
- National Collegiate Athletic Association
- National Federation of State High School Associations
- Native Americans in the United States
- Nellie ball
- Don Nelson
- Netball
- Nicktoons Basketball
- Dirk Nowitzki

== O ==
- Official (Basketball)
- Hakeem Olajuwon
- One on One: Dr. J vs. Larry Bird
- Shaquille O'Neal

== P ==
- Pat Riley Basketball
- Personal foul
- Philippines
- The Physics of Basketball
- Pick and pop
- Pick and roll
- Point forward
- Point guard
- Pok-a-tok
- Power forward
- Princeton Tigers men's basketball
- Princeton offense
- Prison Ball

== Q ==
- Quadruple-double

== R ==
- Rap Jam: Volume One
- Rebound
- Rebounds
- Tammi Reiss
- Rezball
- David Robinson
- Rules of basketball
- Run and gun

== S ==
- Screen
- Shooting guard
- Shot clock
- Shuffle offense
- Six-on-six basketball
- Sixth man
- Slam City with Scottie Pippen
- Slam dunk
- Slamball
- Small Ball
- Small forward
- Dean Smith
- Space Jam
- Space Jam (video game)
- Space Jam: A New Legacy
- Sport
- Street Hoops
- Street Slam
- Street Sports Basketball
- Streetball
- Stutter step
- Pat Summitt
- Swingman

== T ==
- Diana Taurasi
- Team sport
- Technical foul
- The New York Times
- Isiah Thomas
- Three-peat
- Three-point field goal
- Three seconds rule
- Timeline of women's basketball history
- Tip Off
- Traveling
- Triangle and Two Defense
- Triangle offense
- Triple-double
- Turnover
- TV Sports Basketball
- Tweener

== U ==
- UCLA High Post Offense
- ULEB
- ULEB Eurocup
- Ultimate Basketball
- Unicycle basketball
- Unrivaled (basketball)
- Unsportsmanlike conduct

== W ==
- Dwyane Wade
- Water basketball
- Chris Webber
- Victor Wembanyama
- Wheelchair basketball
- White Men Can't Jump
- Wii Sports Resort
- Jason Williams (basketball, born 1975)
- Women's National Basketball Association
- John Wooden
- World Outgames

== Y ==
- Yao Ming

== Z ==
- Zone defense

== See also ==
- Outline of basketball

Basketball Jump Shooting
