= Outline of basketball =

Overview of and topical guide to basketball

Basketball is a ball game and team sport in which two teams of usually five players try to score points by throwing or "shooting" a ball through the top of a basketball hoop while following a set of rules. Basketball was invented by James Naismith in December of 1891 in Springfield, Massachusetts. The game involves positions, fouls and basic rules/instructions to play. In the NBA, there is a limit of 6 fouls before you can no longer play as well as 3 before the other team gets free throws. The positions in Basketball are 1-5: PG (point guard), SG (shooting guard), SF (small forward), PF (power forward), and C (center). This game consists of teamwork and an overall focus on agility and good hand eye coordination. There are areas around the basketball court that are worth 2 and 3 points per basket. The objective is to score more points than the other team with the least mistakes and most communication/made shots.

== Definition ==
- Exercise – bodily activity that enhances or maintains physical fitness and overall health or wellness.
- Game – structured activity, usually undertaken for enjoyment and sometimes used as an educational tool. Games are distinct from work, which is usually carried out for remuneration, and from art, which is more concerned with the expression of ideas. However, the distinction is not clear-cut, and many games are also considered to be work (such as professional sports).
  - Ball game – game played with a ball.
- Sport – form of physical activity which, through casual or organised participation, aim to use, maintain or improve physical fitness and provide entertainment to participants.
  - Competitive sport – sport in which one or more participants or teams compete against one another. The one that is the most successful in achieving the objective of the game or sport event is the winner.
  - Team sport – sport that involves players working together towards a shared objective.
  - Recreational sport – sport engaged in as a leisure time activity.
  - Spectator sport – sport that is characterized by the presence of spectators, or watchers, at its matches. Spectator sports are a form of entertainment.
  - Professional sport – sport in which the athletes receive payment for their performance.

== Equipment of the game ==
- Basketball – inflated ball used in the game of basketball. Basketballs typically range in size from very small promotional items possibly only a few inches in diameter to extra large balls nearly a foot in diameter used in training exercises to increase the skill of players. The standard size of a basketball for men's competitive play is 29.5 inches in circumference; for women's competitive play, the circumference is 28.5 inches. All competitions in the halfcourt game of 3x3, whether men's, women's, or mixed-sex, use a dedicated ball with the circumference of the women's ball but the weight of the men's ball.
  - Rock – the ball
- Basketball court – the playing surface, consisting of a rectangular floor with baskets at either end. In professional or organized basketball, especially when played indoors, it is usually made out of a hardwood, often maple, and highly polished.
  - Backcourt – (1) The half of the court a team is defending. The opposite of the frontcourt. (2) A team's guards.
  - Ball side – The half of the court (divided lengthwise) that the ball is on. Also called the "strong side." The opposite of the help side.
  - Baseline – The line that marks the playing boundary at either end of the court. Also called the "end line."
  - Block – The small painted square on the floor next to the basket just outside the lane.
  - Downtown – Well outside the three-point line.
  - Key – The free-throw lane and free-throw circle together (originally, the lane was narrower than the circle's diameter, giving the area the appearance of a skeleton key hole)
  - Lane – The free-throw lane.
  - Three-point line – the line that separates the two-point area from the three-point area; any shot converted beyond this line counts as three points (except in 3x3, where shots from beyond the arc are worth two points, and free throws and shots from inside the arc worth 1 point). The distance to the three-point line from the center of the basket varies by league:
    - High school – 19.75 feet (6.02 m)
    - NCAA women – 20.75 feet (6.32 m)
    - International and NCAA men — 21.65 feet (6.60 m) to 22.13 feet (6.75 m)
    - WNBA – 22 feet (6.7 m) to 22.13 feet (6.75 m)
    - NBA – 22 feet (6.7 m) to 23.75 feet (7.24 m)
- Bench – (1) Substitutes sitting on the sideline, (2) The bench or chairs they sit on.
- Backboard – The rectangular platform to which the basket is attached, and measure 6 feet (182.9 cm) by 3.5 feet (106.7 cm). There is a backboard at each end of the court.
- Basket – steel rim 18 inches (45.7 cm) in diameter with an attached net affixed to a backboard. There is a basket at each end of the court.
  - Breakaway rim – hoop that can bend slightly when a player dunks a basketball, and then instantly snap back into its original shape when the player releases it. It allows players to dunk the ball without shattering the backboard, and it reduces the possibility of wrist injuries.
  - Hoop – another name for "basket".
- Shot clock – A timer designed to increase the pace (and subsequently, the score) by requiring the ball to either touch the rim or enter the basket before the timer expires, resulting in a loss of possession. The time limit is 12 seconds in 3x3; 24 in FIBA (fullcourt), NBA, and WNBA; and 30 in NCAA men's and women's play. See also airball.

=== Clothing ===
- Basketball singlet top
- Finger sleeve – (not compulsory)an accessory that enhances the grip on the ball during a shot and prevents the ball from rolling or slipping to the top of the fingers.

== Rules of the game ==
Rules of basketball

- Jump ball – method used to begin or resume play in basketball. Two opposing players attempt to gain control of the ball after it is tossed up into the air in between them by an official(umpire).
- Official – a person who has the responsibility to enforce the rules and maintain the order of the game. Also applies to the scorers and timekeepers, as well as other personnel who have an active role in maintaining the game.
- Three-point field goal – also known as a three-pointer, it is a field goal made from beyond the three-point line, a designated arc radiating from the basket. A successful attempt is worth three points, in contrast to the two points awarded for shots made inside the three-point line.
- Three seconds rule – when a player stays in the lane (see above) for three seconds or more. Penalties vary on offense or defense.
- free shot this occurs when a player is fouled allowing them to gain a chance to shoot 2 shots one after another.

=== Infractions ===
==== Fouls ====
Foul – Violation of the rules other than a floor violation, generally when a player attempts to gain advantage by physical contact. Penalized by a change in possession or free-throw opportunities.

- Block – A violation in which a defender steps in front of a dribbler but is still moving when they collide. Also called a "blocking foul."
- Charge – A violation in which one player makes illegal contact with another player who has an established position. Also called a "charging foul."
- Flagrant foul – An unsportsmanlike foul in which there is no serious attempt to play the ball.
- Personal foul – A breach of the rules that concerns illegal personal contact with an opponent. It is the most common type of foul in basketball. Due to the nature of the game, personal fouls occur on occasion and are not always regarded as unsportsmanlike. However, a contact foul involving excessive or unjustified contact is classed as an unsportsmanlike foul (or in the NBA, flagrant foul).
- Offensive foul – A foul committed by a member of the team playing offense.
- Technical foul – A foul assessed for unsportsmanlike non-contact behavior and for some procedural violations (for example, having too many players on the floor or calling timeout when none remain). Penalized by loss of possession after a free throw which may be taken by any member of the opposing team. Frequently abbreviated as "technical" or "T."
- Unsportsmanlike conduct – Acting inappropriately or unprofessionally, such as fighting, verbal abuse, profanity, and flagrant fouls. An offender's team can be penalized by free throws being awarded to the other team followed by loss of possession, and upon repeated transgressions an offender can be ejected from the game.

==== Violations ====
Violation – infraction of the rules other than a foul, such as traveling or a three-second violation.

- 24-second violation – (NBAa, WNBA, FIBA) a shot-clock violation.
- Basket interference – violation involving any of the following:

1. touching the ball or any part of the basket while the ball is on the rim of the basket or within the cylinder extending upwards from the rim
2. reaching up through the basket from below and touching the ball, be it inside or outside the cylinder
3. pulling down on the rim of the basket so that it contacts the ball before returning to its original position.

- Carrying – when a player momentarily stops dribbling, with the ball in one or both hands, and then resumes dribbling.
- Double dribble – Either of the following acts results in a loss of possession:

1. To dribble the ball with two hands at the same time
2. To dribble, stop, and then begin to dribble again

- Backcourt violation –

1. Touching the ball in the backcourt after it has entered the frontcourt and was not last touched by the other team.
2. Failure to bring the ball from the backcourt into the frontcourt within the allotted time of 8 seconds in the NBA (previously 10) and 10 seconds elsewhere. Note that in NCAA women's play, this violation did not exist until the 2013–14 season.

- Five-second rule – Also called the five-second violation, is a rule that helps promote continuous play. The situations in which a five-second violation may occur are:
  - Five-second throw-in violation – a team attempting a throw-in has a total of five seconds to release the ball towards the court.
    - Start of throw in count: When the basketball is at the disposal of the throw in team (usually bounced or handed to the throw in team by the official).
    - Penalty = Loss of ball: A throw-in is awarded to the opponent at the previous throw in spot.
  - Five-second closely guarded violation – When a player with the ball is guarded closely for five seconds.
    - Penalty = Loss of ball: The opposing team gets to throw-in the ball from the out-of-bounds spot nearest the violation.
  - Five-second back to the basket violation (NBA only) –
    - Penalty = Loss of ball: The opponent is awarded the ball at the free throw line extended.
  - Five-second free throw violation – Under FIBA rules, a free throw shooter must throw the ball towards the hoop within five seconds after an official places it at his disposal.
    - Penalty = Lose the shot and possible loss of ball: A successful shot does not count. The ball is awarded to the opponent at the free throw line unless another free throw or a possession penalty is to follow.
- Goaltending – the violation of interfering with the ball when it is on its way to the basket and it is (a) in its downward flight, (b) entirely above the rim and has the possibility of entering the basket, and (c) not touching the rim.
- Over-and-back – See backcourt violation (1)
- Three seconds rule – requires that a player shall not remain in the opponents' restricted area for more than three consecutive seconds while his team is in control of a live ball in the frontcourt and the game clock is running.
- Traveling – To move one's pivot foot illegally or to fall to the floor without maintaining a pivot foot (exact rules vary).

=== Penalties and bonuses ===
Penalties – For infractions of the rules, a team is penalized by bonuses being rewarded to the opposing team.

- And one – The free throw awarded to a shooter who is fouled while scoring.
- Bonus – After a team has accumulated a set number of fouls in a period of play (either half or quarter), the player fouled receives a set number of free throws on each non-shooting foul by the defense. The number varies by league as follows:
  - NCAA men's: All team fouls after the sixth in a half are considered to be "bonus" free throws in both rule sets. However, in popular usage, the "bonus" refers to the situation when the fouling team has seven, eight, or nine fouls in a half. In this situation, the team fouled is said to be "in the bonus" and so gains a one and one opportunity on each non-shooting foul by the defense. The opposing team is "over the limit." See also double bonus and penalty.
  - FIBA, NCAA women's, and NFHS: All team fouls after the fourth in a quarter are "bonus" fouls, with the non-fouling team receiving two free throws on non-shooting fouls by the defense. All overtime periods are considered an extension of the fourth quarter for purposes of accumulated team fouls.
  - NBA and WNBA: Same as FIBA and NCAA women's, except that overtime is not considered an extension of any quarter. The bonus is triggered on the fourth team foul in an overtime period. Additionally, if a team has committed fewer than 4 fouls before the 2-minute mark of any period (including an overtime), its foul count is reset, and the bonus is triggered on the second team foul in the final 2 minutes.
- Double bonus – (NCAA men's) when a team accumulates 10 or more fouls in a half, the other team is "in the double bonus", earning two free throws on each subsequent non-shooting foul by the defense. See also bonus and penalty.
- Free throw – a bonus awarded upon being fouled by a member of the opposing team, in which a player gets to stand at the free throw line unopposed and attempt to make a basket while everyone else is required to stand aside until the shot is over. In cases where more than one free throw is awarded, the other players must wait until after the last shot is executed before play resumes.
- Penalty – once a team reaches a set number of team fouls in a playing period, varying by governing body, the fouled team gets free throws instead of possession of the ball. The fouling team is "over the limit". See also bonus and double bonus.
- One-and-one – (NCAA men's) A free-throw attempt which, if made, allows the player a second free-throw attempt. See also bonus. This rule also applied in NCAA women's play before the 2015–16 season, and in NFHS play before 2023–24.
- Turnover – A loss of possession.

== Game play ==
=== Participants ===
==== Players ====
- Ball hog – A player who does not pass the ball, and takes more shots than everyone else.
- Bricklayer – One who repeatedly shoots bricks (Misses).
- Sixth man (also sixth woman or sixth player) – A player who does not start, but is generally the first person off the bench, and often has statistics comparable to those of starters.

===== Positions =====
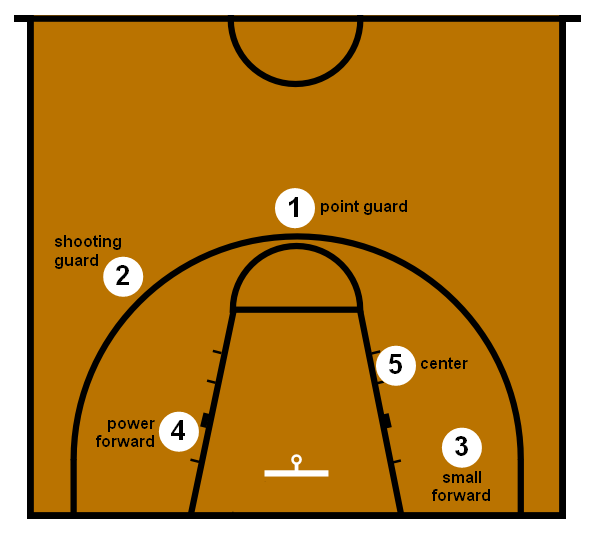
Basketball positions

Basketball position – general location on the court which each player is responsible for. Players are generally described by the position (or positions) played, though the rules do not specify any positions. Positions are part of the strategy that has evolved for playing the game, and terminology for describing game play.

====== Primary positions ======
- Backcourt positions:
  - Guard – One of the three standard player positions. Today, guards are typically classified in two broad categories:
    - Point guard – has strong ballhandling and passing skills and is typically used to run the offense.
    - Shooting guard – as the name implies, are generally the team's best shooters, and are very often the leading scorers on their teams.
- Frontcourt positions:
  - Center – One of the three standard player positions. Centers are generally the tallest players on the floor, responsible mainly for scoring, rebounding, and defense near the basket.
    - Pivot – Another name for center
  - Forward – One of the three standard player positions. Forwards are primarily responsible for scoring and rebounding.
    - Power forward – position that plays a role similar to that of center in what is called the "post" or "low blocks". Power forwards typically play offensively with their backs to the basket and position themselves defensively under the basket in a zone defense or against the opposing power forward in man-to-man defense.
    - Small forward – Typically smaller and quicker than power forwards, these players generally play on offense facing the basket, and very often attack the basket on offense. As with shooting guards, small forwards are often among their teams' leading scorers. Defensively, they will play on the perimeter of a zone defense, or against a physically similar opponent in a man-to-man.

====== Tweeners ======
Tweener – a player who is able to play two positions, but is not ideally suited to play either position exclusively, so he/she is said to be in between. A tweener has a set of skills that do not match the traditional position of his or her physical stature. Tweeners include:

- Combo guard – combines the features of both point guard and shooting guard.
- Forward-center – position for players who play or have played both forward and center on a consistent basis. Typically, this means power forward and center, since these are usually the two biggest player positions on any basketball team, and therefore more often overlap each other.
- Point forward – a forward with strong ballhandling and passing skills who can be called on to direct the team's offense.
- Stretch four – a player capable of playing either forward position. Term derived from the concept of a power forward ("4") capable of "stretching" a defense with outside shooting ability.
- Swingman – a player capable of playing either shooting guard or small forward.

==== Coaches ====
Coach –

- Basketball coach –

=== Strategy ===
- Princeton offense – an offensive strategy which emphasizes constant motion, passing, back-door cuts, and disciplined teamwork. It was used and perfected at Princeton University by Pete Carril, though its roots may be traced back to Franklin "Cappy" Cappon, who coached Princeton Tigers men's basketball in the late 1930s.
- 1-3-1 defense/offense –
- Box-and-one defense – A combination defense in which four defenders play zone in a box formation and the fifth defender guards one player man-to-man.
- Continuity offense – pattern of movement, cuts, screens and passes that eventually leads back to the starting formation, and repeats.
  - Flex offense –
  - Shuffle offense –
- Hack-a-Shaq – The strategy of intentionally and repeatedly committing a personal foul against an otherwise skilled player who shoots free throws poorly. "Shaq" refers to Shaquille O'Neal.
- Jordan Rules –
- Man-to-man defense – A defense in which each player guards a single opposing player. See also zone defense.
- Motion offense – Category of offense involving a series of cuts and screens to create the best possible shot, with most or all offensive players moving simultaneously.
- Nellie ball – a fast-paced offense relying on smaller, more athletic players who can outrun their opponents and make more three-point attempts. Developed by NBA head coach Don Nelson. This offense is most effective against teams that do not have the athleticism or shooting ability to keep up with the fast pace.
- Pack-line defense – A man-to-man defensive system in which one player pressures the ball and the other four players "pack" down within a "line" about 2 feet (0.6 m) inside the three-point arc, with the intent of stopping dribble penetration.
- Run and gun – combined offense and defense in which the team applies constant full-court pressure, while moving the ball forward as quickly as possible and taking the first available shot, often a three-pointer.
  - Grinnell System – A further development of this style, created by Grinnell College head coach David Arseneault. The most striking feature of this system is that entire five-player units are usually substituted every 45 to 90 seconds, in a manner similar to an ice hockey shift.
- Shuffle offense –
- Small Ball – A strategy based in putting shorter players on the playing court, generally non-interior (positions 4 and 5) players
- Triangle offense – An offensive strategy with the goal of exchanging three (sometimes all five) positions, creating spacing among players and allowing each one to pass to four teammates. Originally established by University of Southern California head coach Sam Barry, this offense was later refined and perfected by one of Barry's former players, prominent college and NBA coach Tex Winter.
- Triangle and Two Defense – Similar to a box-and-one, except that in this variation, three defenders (usually the frontcourt players) play zone in a triangular formation and the other two defenders (usually the guards) play man-to-man.
- UCLA High Post Offense –
- Zone defense –
  - 2-3 Zone Defense –

==== Plays ====
- Backdoor cut – offensive play in which a player on the perimeter steps away from the basket, drawing the defender along, then suddenly cuts to the basket behind the defender for a pass. The opposite of a V cut.
- Back screen – offensive play in which a player comes from the low post to set a screen for a player on the perimeter.
- Ball screen – offensive play in which a player sets a screen on the defender guarding the player with the ball.
- Baseline out-of-bounds play – the play used to return the ball to the court from outside the baseline along the opponent's basket.
- Box set – a formation in which four players align themselves as the four corners of a box. Often used for baseline out-of-bounds plays.
- Dribble drive motion – an offense that spreads the players to open up the lane for driving player to make a layup or kick out for a three-pointer.
- Fast break – an offensive tactic in which a team attempts to advance the ball and score as quickly as possible, giving the other team no time to defend effectively. Often the result of a steal or blocked shot.
  - Fly fast break – after a shot is attempted, the player who is guarding the shooter does not box out or rebounds, but runs down the court looking for a pass from a rebounding teammate for a quick score.
- Four-point play – rare play in which a player is fouled but completes a three-point shot and then makes the resulting free throw.
- Halfcourt defense – portion of a team's defensive play conducted with both teams having established positions. See also transition defense.
- Halfcourt offense – portion of a team's offensive play conducted with both teams having established positions. See also transition offense.
- Memphis Attack – another name for dribble drive motion the offense was popularized in the early 2000s at the University of Memphis.
- Pick and pop – offensive play that is a derivative of the classic pick and roll. Instead of rolling toward the basket, however, the player setting the pick moves to an open area of the court to receive a pass from the ballhandler and "pops" a jump shot.
- Pick and roll – A play in which a player who is not the point guard sets a pick for the point guard, and rolls to the hoop.
- Three-point play

1. A play in which a shooter is fouled while making a two-point shot and then makes the resulting free throw. See also and one.
2. When a shooter is fouled while taking but missing a three-point shot and then makes all three free throws. This is rare.

- Transition defense – portion of a team's defensive play conducted when the other team has first gained possession and is moving up the court, before both teams have established positions. Includes defense against fast breaks. See also halfcourt defense.
- Transition offense – portion of a team's offensive play conducted when first obtaining possession from the other team and moving up the court, before both teams have established positions. Includes fast breaks. See also halfcourt offense.

=== Moves ===
Basketball moves – individual actions used by players in basketball to pass by defenders to gain access to the basket or to get a clean pass to a teammate.

- Free throw –
- Advance step – A step in which the defender's lead foot steps toward their man and the back foot slides forward.
- Air ball – An unblocked shot that fails to hit the rim or backboard. Does not reset the shot clock.
- Air pass – A pass that goes straight through the air to the receiver. See also bounce pass.
- Alley-oop – An offensive play in which a player throws the ball up near the basket to a teammate (or, more rarely, to himself) who jumps, catches the ball in mid air and immediately scores a basket, usually with a slam dunk.
- Euro step – An offensive move in which a player, after picking up the dribble, takes a step in one direction and the second allowed step in a different direction while driving to the rim.
- Field goal – A shot made from anywhere on the court, does not include free throws.
- Over the back – a foul committed by a player who tries to rebound the ball by pushing, moving or climbing on a player's back who is already in position to rebound the ball.
- Rebound – To obtain the ball after a missed field goal attempt.

==== Blocking and footwork ====
- Banana cut – A wide, curving cut, as opposed to a cut that is a straight line.
- Basket cut – A cut toward the basket.
- Blindside screen – A screen set directly behind a defender where the player can't see it.
- Block – To tip or deflect a shooter's shot, altering its flight so the shot misses.
- Block out – See "box out"
- Box out – To make contact with an opposing player to establish rebounding position between the player and the ball.
- Bump the cutter – To step in the way of a player who is trying to cut to the ball for a pass.
- Dingle – A steal that leads quickly to a score.
- Rip a C – A motion used while chinning the ball to create space during a pivot between an offensive player and a defensive player. Pivot towards the defender and rips the ball in a C-shape away from the pressure to create a passing lane.
- screen, set a screen – (v) To attempt to prevent a defender from guarding a teammate by standing in the defender's way. The screening player must remain stationary: a moving screen is an offensive foul. (n) The tactic of setting a screen. Also called a "pick".
- Stutter step – a common warm-up drill where you shuffle and scuff your feet in a quick moving motion across a length of flooring. This warm-up is supposed to keep the players alert and help them prepare to defend players in a real game, since the stutter step is a smaller version of shuffling.

==== Dribbling ====
Dribble – to bounce the ball continuously. Required in order to take steps with the ball.

- Wraparound – In the wraparound, the ballhandler dribbles the ball behind his/her back, switching it to his/her other hand. This move can be used when the defender attempts a steal, allowing the ballhandler to begin moving forward as the defense moves in. A streetball move with the same name involves swinging the ball around the opponent's body.
- Spin move – In a spin move, the ballhandler spins his/her body to change the direction and put his body between the ball and the defender. The spin move can be used while dribbling (when it is also called a reverse pivot) or in a post position, where it is often used many times during a game. The move can also leave the ballhandler somewhat disoriented, or to be surprised by a defender after losing eye contact.
- Crossover dribble – In a crossover dribble, the ballhandler changes pace to confuse or freeze a defender. It is also used to put the defender off balance to make it easier for the player handling the ball to dribble past the defender. The move is often performed by street players. In the professional league, players like Allen Iverson, Jason Williams, and Tim Hardaway were known to use this move in order to generate an easy layup or jump shot. This move is most effective in open-court situations, where it is easy to shake or "juke" the defender with a simple crossover. If done properly, the defender will be caught off guard, being unable to change directions. Sometimes, the defender falls down; this is called an ankle breaker.
- Behind-the-back dribble – A basic move in which the ballhandler simply bounces the ball behind the back to the opposite hand, but note that the ball is not intended to go around the body as in the basic 'wraparound'. This move is used to avoid an easy strip, to 'stall', or to 'pick'. It can be used to avoid an easy strip as an alternative to bouncing the ball in front of the dribbler for a tricky crossover. To stall means to overlook what can be set up on the court while still maintaining control over the ball. A pick is virtually the same as a stall but a pick is continuous, meaning that the ball is bounced back and forth behind the back; a pick may also be performed between the legs. The best choice of when to use this move would be in the case of a teammate's unavailability, to outrun a defender, or to drive the ball closer to the hoop due to the lack of space between the ballhandler and defender.

==== Passes ====
Pass – (v) To throw the ball to a teammate. (n) The act of passing.

- Assist – A pass to a teammate who scores a basket immediately or after one dribble.
- Ball fake – A sudden movement by the player with the ball intended to cause the defender to move in one direction, allowing the passer to pass in another direction. Also called "pass fake."
- Ball reversal – Passing of the ball from one side of the court to the other.
- Baseball pass – Also called the lance pass, this is a long pass in which the passer throws the ball with one hand, as if it were a baseball or a football. It is infrequently used, mainly to set up last-second plays off a baseline inbounding situation.
- Behind-the-back – Dealt to a target behind the passer's back. Usually done to confuse the defender, behind the back passes can either be bounced off the floor or passed directly to a teammate's chest. However, most behind-the-back passes are direct. Earl Monroe was famous for this move. Steve Nash uses this move often, and Chris Webber is famed for using this move down in the paint.
- Blind pass – Also known as a no-look pass, the blind pass is performed when a player looks in one direction but passes the ball to his target in another direction. Blind passes are risky and infrequently attempted, but when done correctly, can confuse the defense. The no-look pass has been popularized by players such as Pete Maravich, Isiah Thomas, Magic Johnson, Larry Bird, Jason Kidd and Steve Nash.
- Bounce pass – A fundamental passing technique that consists of one player passing the ball to a teammate by bouncing the ball off the floor with great energy. Because the ball will be at ground level as it passes a defender, a successful bounce pass can easily result in a scoring assist because a bounce pass is harder for defenders to intercept. Still, a bounce pass may be intercepted due to its slower speed. Thus, a player must use his best judgment when he decides whether to make such a pass. The move has to be executed perfectly because a bounce pass may be kicked by rapidly shifting players and might be a difficult catch for the intended receiver.
- Chest pass – This pass is performed best by stepping towards your target with one foot, then throwing the ball out towards their chest with two hands while turning the hands over, ending with the thumbs pointing down. It is best used in the open court and on the perimeter.
- Dime – See drop a dime.
- Dish – An assist.
- Drop a dime – To make an assist
- Elbow pass – Introduced with much hype by Jason Williams, the Elbow Pass is one of the most difficult trick passes to execute. The Elbow Pass serves as a devastating complement to the Behind-the-Back pass and can be used with various no-look elements. Most effective on a fast-break, the Elbow Pass entails what appears to the defender to be a simple Behind-the-Back pass, but as the ball crosses the passer's back, the passer hits it with his elbow, redirecting the ball back toward the side it started on and hopefully leaving the defender(s) amazed and out of position. Williams was able to pull off this pass at a full sprint during a Rookie All-Star game, but most players have trouble hitting the ball with their elbow while standing still.
- Jump pass – A pass performed while the passing player's feet are off the floor. When done intentionally, usually when a teammate gets open during the shot, it can sometimes confuse the defender, causing him to believe that the passer is shooting instead of passing. However, it at times is done as a result of the player having their shooting lane blocked and often leads to the player turning the ball over to the opposing team. This kind of pass is strongly discouraged in all levels of basketball, as it leaves the offensive player very vulnerable to turnovers.
- Outlet pass – A pass thrown by a rebounder to start a fast break.
- Overhead pass – another fundamental passing technique, used by snapping the ball over the head, like a soccer throw-in. This pass is especially effective in helping to initiate a fast break. After a defensive rebound, a well-thrown overhead, or outlet, pass can allow a breaking offensive player to quickly score without even dribbling by catching the ball near the basket.

==== Shots ====
- Bank shot – A shot that hits the backboard before hitting the rim or going through the net.
- Board – A shot resulting in a rebound.
- Brick – A bad shot that bounces off the backboard or rim without a chance of going in.
- Buzzer beater – A basket in the final seconds of a game (right before the buzzer sounds) that in itself results in a win or overtime.
- Dunk – (v) To score by putting the ball directly through the basket with one or both hands. (n) A shot made by dunking.
- Fadeaway – A jump shot taken while jumping backwards, away from the basket.
- Free throw – An unopposed attempt to score a basket, worth one point, from the free throw line. Generally, two attempts are awarded when the player is fouled in the act of shooting (three attempts are awarded in the case of three-point shot), fouled flagrantly, or when the opposing team fouls while over the foul limit. Depending on the specifics of the foul and the rule set, one or two attempts may be awarded for technical fouls.
- Hook shot – A shot in which the offensive player arcs the ball over his head using the farthest hand from the basket, while moving perpendicular to the basket.
- In-n-out – A shot that appears to be going in, but instead goes back out.
- Jump shot – A shot taken while jumping
- Lay-in – A close-range shot using one hand to tip the ball over the rim
- Layup – A close-range shot using one hand to bank the ball off the backboard
- Points in the paint – Field goals made in the painted area below the free-throw line
- Prayer – A shot that has very little probability of being made.
- Set shot – A shot taken without leaving the floor.
- Slam dunk – A shot performed with the player jumping in air and forces the ball into the rim with one or both hands.
- Swish – (n) A shot which goes through the net without hitting the backboard or rim. (v) To make a swish.
- Three-ball – A three-point field goal
- Three-point field goal – A shot, worth three points, attempted with both feet behind the three-point line.
- Three-pointer – A three-point field goal
- Toilet bowl – When the ball hits the rim on a certain angle and then circles around it, can go in or out.
- Trey – A three-point field goal

== History of basketball ==
History of basketball

- James Naismith – invented basketball in 1891
  - Ullamaliztli – basketball was in part based on the ancient Aztec ballgame.
  - Pok-a-tok – James Naismith also based basketball on the ancient Mayan ballgame.
- Six-on-six basketball – largely archaic variant of women's basketball, with six players on each team instead of five, and in which only forwards are allowed to shoot the ball and must stay in their team's frontcourt, while guards must stay in their team's backcourt.
- Continental Basketball Association – was a professional men's basketball league in the United States, affiliated with USA Basketball.
- Four corners offense – an offensive strategy for stalling that was rendered obsolete by the introduction of the shot clock and the three-point line.

=== History of the NBA ===
Main articles: History of the National Basketball Association and List of National Basketball Association seasons

Basketball Association of America (BAA)

- 1946–47 season
- 1947–48 season
- 1948–49 season

National Basketball Association (NBA)

- 1949–50 season
- 1950–51 season
- 1951–52 season
- 1952–53 season
- 1953–54 season
- 1954–55 season
- 1955–56 season
- 1956–57 season
- 1957–58 season
- 1958–59 season
- 1959–60 season
- 1960–61 season
- 1961–62 season
- 1962–63 season
- 1963–64 season
- 1964–65 season
- 1965–66 season
- 1966–67 season
- 1967–68 season
- 1968–69 season
- 1969–70 season
- 1970–71 season
- 1971–72 season
- 1972–73 season
- 1973–74 season
- 1974–75 season
- 1975–76 season
- 1976–77 season
- 1977–78 season
- 1978–79 season
- 1979–80 season
- 1980–81 season
- 1981–82 season
- 1982–83 season
- 1983–84 season
- 1984–85 season
- 1985–86 season
- 1986–87 season
- 1987–88 season
- 1988–89 season
- 1989–90 season
- 1990–91 season
- 1991–92 season
- 1992–93 season
- 1993–94 season
- 1994–95 season
- 1995–96 season
- 1996–97 season
- 1997–98 season
- 1998–99 season
- 1999–2000 season
- 2000–01 season
- 2001–02 season
- 2002–03 season
- 2003–04 season
- 2004–05 season
- 2005–06 season
- 2006–07 season
- 2007–08 season
- 2008–09 season
- 2009–10 season
- 2010–11 season
- 2011–12 season
- 2012–13 season
- 2013–14 season
- 2014–15 season
- 2015–16 season
- 2016–17 season
- 2017–18 season
- 2018–19 season
- 2019–20 season
- 2020–21 season
- 2021–22 season
- 2022–23 season
- 2023–24 season
- 2024–25 season

==== NBA seasons by team ====
- List of Atlanta Hawks seasons
- List of Boston Celtics seasons
- List of Brooklyn Nets seasons
- List of Charlotte Hornets seasons
- List of Chicago Bulls seasons
- List of Cleveland Cavaliers seasons
- List of Dallas Mavericks seasons
- List of Denver Nuggets seasons
- List of Detroit Pistons seasons
- List of Golden State Warriors seasons
- List of Houston Rockets seasons
- List of Indiana Pacers seasons
- List of Los Angeles Clippers seasons
- List of Los Angeles Lakers seasons
- List of Memphis Grizzlies seasons
- List of Miami Heat seasons
- List of Milwaukee Bucks seasons
- List of Minnesota Timberwolves seasons
- List of New Orleans Pelicans seasons
- List of New York Knicks seasons
- List of Oklahoma City Thunder seasons
- List of Orlando Magic seasons
- List of Philadelphia 76ers seasons
- List of Phoenix Suns seasons
- List of Portland Trail Blazers seasons
- List of Sacramento Kings seasons
- List of San Antonio Spurs seasons
- List of Toronto Raptors seasons
- List of Utah Jazz seasons
- List of Washington Wizards seasons

== Miscellaneous terms ==
- End of quarter – when a quarter ends
- Halftime – (1) The end of the first half of play. (2) The interval between the two halves.
- Pivot – (1) A center (2) The pivot foot.
- Pivot foot – The foot that must remain touching the floor to avoid traveling
- Run – An interval in which one team heavily outscores the other.
- Hot hand fallacy – Is the notion that a streak of positive successes are likely to continue, but statistics show that the probability of a streak continuing actually goes down as the length increases.
- 5 man weave – drill consisting of 5 players spaced evenly along the baseline, with the middle player holding the ball. On the smack of the ball players pass the ball repeatedly to the nearest player, while traveling up the court. They then run behind two players. Upon reaching the end of the court the drill turns into a 3 on 2 drill, with the person who shot the layup and the last passer returning to play defense. The ballhandler amongst the group of the 3 retreats to the other end after attacking the goal. The 2 defenders attack the single defender resulting in a 2 on 1 to the other side. These remaining 3 players then execute a 3-man weave to the far baseline.
- Three-peat – winning three consecutive championships.

== Organized basketball ==
=== Leagues and governing bodies ===
- ACB – The top professional league in Spain, often regarded as the second-strongest domestic league in the world behind the NBA. Initialism for the Spanish Asociación de Clubes de Baloncesto ("Association of Basketball Clubs").
- EuroCup – Europe's second-level transnational club competition, operated by Euroleague Basketball, a joint venture of 11 top European clubs. Analogous to the UEFA Europa League in association football (soccer).
- EuroLeague – Europe's top transnational club competition, also operated by Euroleague Basketball. Analogous to the UEFA Champions League in football (soccer).
- FIBA – The International Basketball Federation, an association of national organizations which governs international competitions.
  - Basketball at the Summer Olympics – Basketball has been an Olympic sport since 1936.
  - FIBA Basketball World Cup and FIBA Women's Basketball World Cup – The world championships for national teams.
- NBA – The National Basketball Association, the largest professional league in the United States, also with one team in Canada.
  - NBA G League – the minor league for players trying to make it to the NBA. Includes one team in Canada and one in Mexico.
- NCAA – The National Collegiate Athletic Association, the primary governing body for intercollegiate sports in the United States. Also, national tournaments operated by this body, especially the Division I men's and women's tournaments. An unrelated body with the same name exists in the Philippines.
- NFHS – The National Federation of State High School Associations, the body that sets rules for high school sports in the U.S., including basketball.
- ULEB – A cooperative organization of professional basketball leagues in Europe, it operated the EuroLeague and EuroCup before handing responsibility to the Euroleague Company. The name is a French acronym for "Union of European Leagues of Basketball".
- Unrivaled – A U.S.-based women's professional league, launched in 2025, that plays 3-on-3 basketball on a compressed full court. The league was created to allow WNBA players to play competitively in the U.S. during the traditional basketball season.
- WNBA – The Women's National Basketball Association, the largest professional basketball league for women in the United States.

=== Statistics ===
- 5×5 – A minimum of 5 in all positive stat categories (points, rebounds, assists, steals, and blocks).
- Double-double – Double-digit figures in two positive statistical categories (example: 12 points, 14 rebounds)
- One trillion – A box score showing one minute played and zero for all other statistics, resulting in a one followed by twelve zeros—the conventional American rendering of "One trillion."
- Quadruple-double – Double-digit figures in four positive statistical categories (example: 12 points, 14 rebounds, 10 assists, 10 steals)
- Triple-double – Double-digit figures in three positive statistical categories (example: 12 points, 14 rebounds, 10 assists)

== Persons influential in the sport of basketball ==
=== Contributors ===
- Dr. James Naismith – Inventor of the sport.
- Danny Biasone – Promoted the shot clock, an innovation widely considered to have saved the NBA in the 1950s. While he did not originate the concept of the shot clock, the 24-second duration used by the NBA and FIBA is his idea.
- David Stern – Commissioner of the NBA from 1984 to 2014, credited with shepherding the growth of the NBA during his tenure. Also the main driving force behind the creation of the WNBA.
- Dick Vitale – Former college and professional coach who achieved fame as a play-by-play announcer for college basketball on ESPN. A fixture with ESPN since the network's creation in 1979, he is most noted for his enthusiastic and often hyperactive announcing style.

=== Players ===
- Kareem Abdul-Jabbar – Retired as the leading career scorer in NBA history; winner of six NBA titles (one with the Milwaukee Bucks and five with the Los Angeles Lakers) and a record six NBA MVP awards.
- Larry Bird – One of the greatest forwards in NBA history, Bird led the Boston Celtics as they battled the Los Angeles Lakers for NBA supremacy through the 1980s. His (friendly) personal rivalry with Magic Johnson (below) was a major force in the NBA's growth in the 1980s and beyond.
- Wilt Chamberlain – Arguably the most physically dominant player in basketball history, Chamberlain was one of the NBA's leading scorers and rebounders through the 1960s and into the early 1970s.
- Caitlin Clark – The leading career scorer in NCAA Division I women's history, the Iowa product and current Indiana Fever star has been credited with sparking unprecedented interest in women's basketball in the 2020s.
- Chuck Cooper, Nathaniel Clifton, Earl Lloyd – The first three African Americans in the NBA. Cooper was the first to be drafted by an NBA team, Clifton the first to sign an NBA contract who appeared in a game, and Lloyd the first to actually play in the league. All three are in the Hall of Fame, Cooper as a player and Clifton and Lloyd as contributors.
- Stephen Curry – One of the faces of today's NBA and one of the greatest shooters in NBA history. Named NBA MVP in 2015 and unanimously in 2016.
- Julius Erving – Commonly known as "Dr. J", he revolutionized a new style of basketball that emphasized playing above the rim in the 1970s and 1980s. A star player in both the ABA and NBA, Erving popularized his signature "slam dunk", and help spur the NBA's rise in popularity in the modern era.
- LeBron James – The NBA's current career scoring leader. four-time league MVP, three-time champion, and arguably the current face of the NBA.
- Magic Johnson – One of the greatest floor leaders in NBA history, Johnson led the Showtime Lakers of the 1980s and played a major role in the NBA's growth since 1980.
- Nikola Jokić – The Serbian center for the Denver Nuggets is another current face of the NBA, with three MVP awards in the 2020s.
- Michael Jordan – Widely acclaimed as the greatest player in history, the NBA's all-time leader in scoring average was the face of the Chicago Bulls dynasty of the 1990s, and even of the NBA as a whole.
- George Mikan - Regarded as the NBA's first true superstar, Mikan played for the Minneapolis Lakers and directed them to 5 NBA titles in 6 seasons. He is noted as a pioneer of big men in basketball, with his rebounding, shot blocking and ambidextrous hook shot.
- Dirk Nowitzki – The first European-trained player to be named NBA MVP, Nowitzki was a perennial All-Star for the Dallas Mavericks, and guided them to the NBA Championship in 2011.
- Shaquille O'Neal – Perhaps the most physically dominant center since Chamberlain, and one of the NBA's biggest stars for much of the 1990s and 2000s.
- Dražen Petrović – The first European-trained player to make a major impact in the NBA. Died in a 1993 automobile accident when on the verge of NBA superstardom.
- Oscar Robertson – "The Big O" is the first of only two players to average a triple-double for an entire campaign in the 1961–62 season, and was noted for both his abilities as a playmaker and a scorer. He later helped Kareem Abdul-Jabbar win the NBA Championship for the Milwaukee Bucks in 1971.
- Bill Russell – The centerpiece of the Boston Celtics dynasty of the 1950s and 1960s, winning 11 NBA titles while establishing himself as one of the greatest rebounders and defenders in history. A member of the Naismith Hall as both a player and coach, Russell is also the only player to have his number retired by the NBA.
- Jerry West – West was one of the NBA's greatest all-around combo guards, being equally strong on offense and defense. He was also known for making key baskets in late stages of games, earning him the nickname "Mr. Clutch". Later nicknamed "The Logo", as he was the model for the NBA's current logo. Also the only person to date to enter the Naismith Hall three times—first as a player, next as part of the 1960 US Olympic team, and finally as a contributor for his career as an NBA team executive.
- Yao Ming – The face of basketball in China in the 2000s. The first Chinese NBA superstar, and also the first #1 overall NBA draft pick to have been both born and trained outside the U.S.

=== Coaches ===
- Red Auerbach – Architect of the Boston Celtics from 1950 until his death in 2006, he won nine NBA titles as head coach and seven more as general manager and team president.
- Geno Auriemma – Current UConn Huskies women's coach; winner of 12 NCAA titles, including six unbeaten seasons and separate NCAA Division I-record winning streaks of 70, 90, and 111 games. Became the winningest head coach in Division I history (men's or women's) in 2024. Also a former head coach of the USA women's national team.
- Larry Brown - Regarded as one of the greatest coaches in basketball history, Brown was a proven winner in both collegiate and professional basketball. He is the only coach to win both an NCAA national championship (with Kansas in 1988) and an NBA championship (In 2004 with the Detroit Pistons).
- Chuck Daly - Daly's coaching career started with a highly successful run in the Ivy League as the head coach of Penn. Daly then guided the Detroit Pistons to back-to-back NBA titles in 1989 & 1990, and also coached the Dream Team to the gold medal at the 1992 Summer Olympics.
- Red Holzman - Holzman is best known for coaching the New York Knicks to two NBA titles in 1970 and 1973. His teams were known for strong teamwork, tough defense, and unselfish play on offense.
- Phil Jackson – Winner of a record 11 NBA titles as a head coach—six with the Chicago Bulls dynasty of the 1990s, and five with the Los Angeles Lakers in the 21st century.
- Bob Knight – Highly successful though often controversial, Knight is most famous for his long tenure at Indiana University, where he won three NCAA titles. Retired as the winningest head coach in Division I men's history; since surpassed by his protege Mike Krzyzewski (see below).
- Mike Krzyzewski – A former player under Knight at Army, "Coach K" successfully rebuilt Duke into one of the most powerful NCAA men's programs, with five NCAA titles to his credit. Surpassed Knight as the winningest Division I men's coach in 2011–12. Also a former head coach of the USA men's national team, leading the "Redeem Team" to Olympic gold in 2008 and repeating in 2012 and 2016.
- John Kundla - Kundla coached the NBA's first great dynasty, the Minneapolis Lakers of the early 1950s. Leading a team starring George Mikan, Kundla guided the Lakers to 5 NBA titles in 6 years.
- Nancy Lieberman – Though more famous as one of the top women's players in history, she has also made history as the first woman to coach an NBA or NBA Development League team; she made her debut coaching the Texas Legends on November 17, 2010.
- Kim Mulkey – The Women's Hall of Fame player achieved even greater success as a coach, being inducted to the Naismith Hall in that role. Mulkey is the only person to have won NCAA Division I titles as a head coach at two different schools (three at Baylor, one at LSU), and the only one to have won D-I titles as a player (Louisiana Tech), assistant coach (also Louisiana Tech), and head coach.
- Gregg Popovich - A 3-time winner of the NBA Coach of the Year Award, Popovich has coached the San Antonio Spurs to 5 NBA titles since 1996, and has won more total games (regular-season and playoffs combined) than any other NBA coach. Succeeded Krzyzewski as USA men's national head coach following the 2016 Olympics.
- Pat Riley - Also a 3-time winner of the NBA Coach of the Year Award. Riley first coached the Los Angeles Lakers to 4 NBA titles in the 1980s, forging a dynasty known as "Showtime." He then coached the New York Knicks in the mid-1990s, and finally served twice as coach of the Miami Heat, winning a 5th title in 2006.
- Adolph Rupp – The main architect of the University of Kentucky's basketball tradition, who won four NCAA titles and retired as the winningest Division I men's coach.
- Dean Smith – Reestablished the University of North Carolina's basketball tradition, surpassing Rupp as the winningest Division I men's coach in the process. He retired with 2 NCAA titles along the way and recorded 879 career victories.
- Dawn Staley – The Hall of Fame player went on to an arguably more successful coaching career. As head coach of the South Carolina Gamecocks since 2008, she has led the Gamecocks to three national titles, and has so far claimed at least one of the major national coach of the year awards four times in the 2020s. Also a former head coach of the US national women's team.
- Pat Summitt – Head coach of the Tennessee Lady Volunteers for 38 seasons until retiring in 2012; winner of eight NCAA titles and the first coach (men's or women's) to win 1,000 games in NCAA play.
- Tara VanDerveer – Head coach of the Stanford Cardinal women for 39 seasons until retiring in 2024, VanDerveer won two NCAA titles and retired as the winningest men's or women's coach in Division I history (a distinction that passed to Auriemma a few months later).
- John Wooden – UCLA legend who led the Bruins to seven consecutive NCAA titles and 10 in 12 years, with four unbeaten seasons and a winning streak of 88 games, still a record in Division I men's play.

== Variations and similar games ==
- Recreational basketball – where fun, entertainment and camaraderie rule rather than winning a game

=== Player number variants ===
- 3x3 – A formalized version of three-on-three halfcourt basketball created by FIBA in 2007, and currently being heavily promoted by the federation. Originally known as FIBA 33.

=== Play medium variants ===
- Beach basketball – played on beaches in a circular court with no backboard and no out-of-bounds rule, with the ball movement done via passes or 2½ steps, as dribbling is next to impossible on sand.
- Streetball – variation typically played on outdoor courts, with rules that vary widely from court to court. In most versions there are no free throws, and carrying, traveling, and double dribbling are allowed.
- Water basketball – played in a swimming pool with a floating boardless hoop, combining rules from basketball and water polo.

=== Riding variants ===
- Donkey basketball – Played on the backs of donkeys, this version has come under attack from animal rights groups.
- Horseball – game played on horseback where a ball is handled and points are scored by shooting it through a high net (approximately 1.5m×1.5m). It is a combination of polo, rugby, and basketball.
- Unicycle basketball – is played using a regulation basketball on a regular basketball court with the same rules, e.g., one must dribble the ball whilst riding.
- Wheelchair basketball – designed for disabled people in wheelchairs and is considered one of the major disabled sports practiced.

=== Special interest group variants ===
- Basketball Schools and Academies – where students are trained in developing basketball fundamentals, undergo fitness and endurance exercises and learn various basketball skills. Basketball students learn proper ways of passing, ball handling, dribbling, shooting from various distances, rebounding, offensive moves, defense, layups, screens, basketball rules and basketball ethics. Also popular are the basketball camps organized for various occasions, often to get prepared for basketball events, and basketball clinics for improving skills.
- Disabled basketball played by various disabled groups, such as:
  - Bankshot basketball –
  - Deaf basketball – Basketball played by deaf people. Despite the game's many whistles due to its "no contact" nature of play, deaf players have adapted well to reading the flow of the game and can easily tell when a foul is committed. Sign language is also used to communicate referee decisions and communication between players.
  - Wheelchair basketball – based on basketball but designed for disabled people in wheelchairs and considered one of the major disabled sports practiced.
- College and University basketball – played in educational institutions of higher learning.
  - National Collegiate Athletic Association (NCAA) – Intercollegiate basketball, commonly known as College basketball in the United States although it is also played in most universities in the country.
- Ethnic and Religion-based basketball – Examples of ethnic basketball include Indo-Pak or Russian or Armenian leagues in the United States or Canada, for example, or Filipino expatriate basketball leagues in the Gulf or the United States. Religion-based basketball includes, most notably, church-related Christian basketball leagues, Jewish, Muslim and Hindu basketball leagues, etc. or denominational leagues like Coptic, Assyrian basketball leagues in the United States or Canada.
- Gay basketball – played in gay, lesbian, bisexual and transgender communities in gay basketball leagues. The sport of basketball is a major part of events during the Gay Games, World Outgames and EuroGames.
- Midnight basketball – a basketball initiative to curb inner-city crime in the United States and elsewhere by keeping urban youth off the streets and engaging them with sports alternatives to drugs and crime.
- Mini basketball – played by underage children.
- Maxi Basketball – played by more elderly individuals.
- Rezball, short for reservation ball, is the avid Native American following of basketball, especially a style of play particular to Native American teams in parts of the Western United States.
- Prison basketball, practiced in prisons and penitentiary institutions. Active religious basketball missionary groups also play basketball with prisoners. Some prisons have developed their own prison basketball leagues. At times, non-prisoners may play in such leagues, provided all home and away games are played within prison courts. Film director Jason Moriarty has released a documentary relating to the sport, entitled Prison Ball.
- School or High school basketball – the sport of basketball being one of the most frequently exercised and popular sports in all school systems.

=== Show basketball ===
Show basketball – Performed by entertainment basketball show teams, like the Harlem Globetrotters. Specialized entertainment teams include:

- Celebrity basketball – teams of celebrities (actors, musicians, etc.) playing in their own leagues or in public, often for entertainment and charity events;
- Midget basketball – teams of athletes of short stature offering shows using basketball;
- Slamball – offered as entertainment events.

=== Alternate game forms ===
- Fantasy basketball – a game where participants act as owners to build a basketball team that competes against other fantasy basketball team owners based on the statistics generated by the real individual players.

Basketball video games

- All-Pro Basketball
- Arcade Hoops Basketball
- Arch Rivals
- Backyard Basketball
- Barkley Shut Up and Jam!
- Barkley Shut Up and Jam! 2
- Basket Master
- Basketball (1978 video game)
- Basketball (1980 video game)
- Basketball Challenge
- Basketball Nightmare
- Basketbrawl
- Bill Laimbeer's Combat Basketball
- David Robinson's Supreme Court
- Disney Sports Basketball
- Double Dribble
- Double Dribble: The Playoff Edition
- Double Dunk
- FreeStyle Street Basketball
- GBA Championship Basketball: Two-on-Two
- Golden Basket
- Harlem Globetrotters
- HoopWorld
- Hoops
- Jammit
- Jordan vs. Bird: One on One
- Kidz Sports Basketball
- Looney Tunes B-Ball
- Magic Johnson's Basketball
- Mario Hoops 3-on-3
- Mario Sports Mix
- Michael Jordan in Flight
- NBA 2K
- NBA Elite series
- NBA Give 'n Go
- NBA in the Zone
- NBA Jam
- NBA Live
- NBA Showtime: NBA on NBC
- NBA Street
- Nekketsu Street Basket: Ganbare Dunk Heroes
- Nicktoons Basketball
- One on One: Dr. J vs. Larry Bird
- Pat Riley Basketball
- Rap Jam: Volume One
- Slam City with Scottie Pippen
- Space Jam
- Street Hoops
- Street Slam
- Street Sports Basketball
- Summer Sports: Paradise Island
- Tip Off
- TV Sports Basketball
- Ultimate Basketball
- White Men Can't Jump
- Wii Sports Resort
- World Basketball Manager

=== Spin-offs ===
Spin-offs from basketball that are now separate sports include:

- Korfball – played by 2 teams that each have 2 males and 2 females, on a court divided into 2 zones, with each zone having a pole (without a backboard) with a netless hoop at the top. Unlike basketball, in which the hoops are placed at the ends of the court, in korfball the hoops are placed well within the zones.
- Netball – played between two teams of seven players on a rectangular court divided into thirds, with a raised netted hoop (without a backboard) at each short end.
- Slamball – form of basketball played with 3 trampolines in front of each net. It is played "full contact" and has boards around the court.

== See also ==
- Index of basketball articles
- Outline of sports
