= Shyrone Chatman =

American basketball college coach

Current position
- Title: Interim Head coach
- Team: Texas Southern
- Conference: SWAC
- Record: 0–0 (–)

Playing career
- 1997–2001: Memphis

Coaching career (HC unless noted)
- 2011–2016: UMass (assistant)
- 2016–2017: UMass (associate HC)
- 2017–2026: Texas Southern (assistant)
- 2026–present: Texas Southern (interim HC)

Administrative career (AD unless noted)
- 2006–2008: Memphis (assistant to the recruiting coordinator)
- 2008–2011: UMass (director of player personnel)

Head coaching record
- Overall: 0–0 (–)

Shyrone Chatman is an American college basketball coach who is currently the interim head coach for the Texas Southern Tigers.

== Playing career ==
Chatman played four seasons for the Memphis Tigers from 1997 through 2001, where he appeared in 116 games with 42 starts, averaging 5.5 points, 2.1 rebounds, 2.1 assists, and 0.7 steals per game.

== Coaching career ==
In 2006, Chatman got his first career coaching job as an assistant to the recruiting coordinator at Memphis. In 2008, he was hired as the director of player personnel at UMass. In 2011, Chatman was promoted to serve as an assistant coach for the Minutemen. In 2016, he was promoted again to serve as the team's associate head coach. In 2017, Chatman joined Texas Southern as an assistant coach. Heading into the 2026 season, he was promoted to serve as the Tigers' interim head coach after former head coach Johnny Jones left for his alma mater, LSU.
