= Celtic seasons =

Celtic seasons may refer to:

- Celtic calendar
- List of Boston Celtics seasons
- List of Celtic F.C. seasons
