= The Physics of Basketball =

Book by John Fontanella

- Author: John Fontanella
- Language: English
- Subject: Physics and Basketball
- Genre: Non-fiction
- Publisher: Johns Hopkins University Press
- Publication date: 2006-11-15
- Media type: Print (Hardcover)
- Pages: 168
- ISBN: 0-8018-8513-2
- OCLC: 65400495
- Dewey Decimal: 796.32301/53 22
- LC Class: QC26 .F66 2006

The Physics of Basketball is a non-fiction book by John Fontanella first published on November 15, 2006 that explores the scientific side of basketball. It is written from the perspective of a fan of the game and then through the eyes of a physicist.

John Fontanella has been a physics professor at the United States Naval Academy since 1971 and was a college basketball player for Westminster College in New Wilmington, PA. As a senior in 1967, he was a NAIA First Team All-American. He then earned an NCAA postgraduate scholarship to Case Western Reserve where he earned his Ph.D. in Physics. He is currently focusing his research on naval applications of dielectrics.
