= 1–3–1 defense and offense =

Basketball strategy

The 1–3–1 defense and offense is a popular strategy used in basketball.

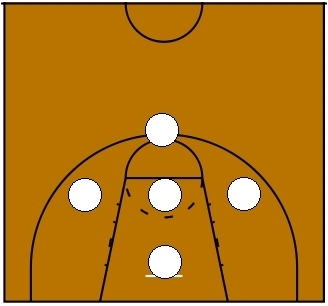
Typical 1-3-1 Formation

The 1-3-1 zone defense is a defensive basketball formation. It was originally utilized by legendary basketball coach Red Sarachek. This defense is named for its formation since there is one defender at the point, three defenders at the free throw level, and one defender at the base line. The main focus of this defensive strategy is to force turnovers. This is done by using quick, pestering defense and anticipating any passes to attempt a steal. A two-man trap is implemented in this defense. The defense attempts to guide the ball handler towards a corner and quickly close in and double team the offensive player creating a trap with the defenders and side lines. This trap often forces the ball handler to get rid of the ball prematurely taking the offense out of their set up. This often results in poor passes or shots. These poor passes are meant to be taken advantage of in this defense so the weak side defenders must anticipate passes to create turnovers.

== Defense ==
The defensive usage of the 1-3-1 is mostly used to create turnovers, not for protecting the paint, due to only having one player down low. Teams usually have two guards to double team the ball carrier.

Another variation of the 1-3-1 defense is the full court press version. The lead guard will pressure the ball in the backcourt, and also can shade over to the side and form a 2-man trap with a defensive player in the 3-set when an offensive guard tries to bring up the ball down the sideline.

One effective press-break against the 1-3-1 full court press is to have either the power forward or the center to flash to midcourt and then quickly pass the weak side guard running down the sideline, not allowing the trap to be formed.

There are multiple ways to approach defense in the sport of basketball. Typically they are divided into man defenses and zone defenses. The 1-3-1 zone defense is a zone defense. It falls under this category because each player guards a specific zone within the formation. This defense is named for its formation. A picture of the formation is shown on the right. In basketball positions are numbered from one to five. One and two are guards, three and four are forwards, and five is the center in a typical basketball lineup. Guards are quick and typically are good ball handlers and shooters. Forwards are usually the most athletic, and are typically taller than the guards. The center is the tallest player and specializes in close vicinity to the basket.

== Formation ==
In this formation, the one will take the top and meet the oncoming offensive guard. The two and three positions are split out on the edges of the court at free throw level, or on the wing. The four position is down beneath the basket and acts as a rover along the base line. The rover position is typically the best athlete's position since there is the most area to defend around the basket. The five position is posted in the center of the formation at about free throw level.

== Zone responsibilities ==
The goal of the 1-3-1 zone defense is to create turnovers. This defense focuses extra pressure on the ball handler and will exert more effort to force turnovers. Turnovers within this defense are created by a couple key features of this strategy. Two defensive players will try to trap the ball handler in one of the corners of the half court. If a player is trapped in the corner they tend to stop their dribble before making a decision to pass or shoot. This creates a problem for the offense but is exactly what the defense wants to happen. When a player is double teamed without their dribble they tend to make poor decisions. Often bad passes and shots are forced out by the player just to get the ball out of the corner. It is vital for players not guarding the ball handler to anticipate a bad pass or shot in order to make a steal or get a rebound. This will help create the most turnovers.

Each player will have their own responsibility in the zone. They each have their own area to guard on the court. Players will also shift as the ball is moved to be in better defensive position. This means moving to a better location to cut off passes and gather rebounds. Typically, the one will take the top position. They will meet the ball handler and force them in one direction while playing close defense. Based on the direction the ball handler dribbles the defender on the wing, either the two or three position, will close in on the ball handler for a double team. The intention is to force a double team quickly and drive the offensive player into a corner of the court. The double team creates a lot of free space on the court. The other three players must shift to cover this area equally during a trap. A trap can be made at any of the four corners both at the base line and at half court. The only difference is the base line is defended by the rover and they will trap with the wing instead of the one position. By forcing these double teams the offense will make long cross court passes. These passes are more likely to get stolen because they are less accurate and travel in the air longer. More space is open during a double team so the defenders not trapping must take advantage of the long passes and force any possible turnovers

== Coaching strategy ==
Defensively Coaches usually do this to throw the offense off tempo. It is thrown in to mix up the defensive look and force the offense to adjust or face flustering defensive pressure. Normally the 1-3-1 defense is used to create turnovers and is fast paced so players cannot keep it up the whole game. By applying pressure to the ballhandler the defense plans to take advantage of any mistakes forced from the pressure. The extra defensive pressure often makes the ball handler lose some composure and turn the ball over. By using this at key points in the game this strategy can change momentum, cause quick scoring shifts, and create a large enough lead to break the opponents morale. This defense is very effective if run correctly and can take a team out of the game both physically and mentally.

Offensively The 1-3-1 defense attempts to fluster the offensive set up. The key to beating the 1-3-1 zone is to get the defenders out of position. This is accomplished by quickly passing the ball around the perimeter. If the offense can pass the ball before the defense traps them then the defense must shift to adjust to the new ball position. As the defense shifts passing lanes open up and defenders have to rotate to stay in position. Speeding up the tempo and running fast breaks also can beat this defense. Pushing the ball quickly up the court gives the defense little time to set up the zone. If the offense can get to the basket before the zone sets up scoring can be achieved easily. The defense can easily be beaten if composure is kept and good passes are made. Issues occur when the offense is surprised by the extra pressure and is not expecting the trap that occur in basketball.
