= 5 man weave =

Basketball drill

The 5 man weave is a basketball drill introduced at Lindsey Wilson College in Columbia, Kentucky in 1991. Assistant coach Ed Yuhas introduced the drill as a pre-season conditioning drill. The initial drill consisted of five players spaced evenly along the baseline, with the middle player holding the ball. On the smack of the ball players pass the ball repeatedly to the nearest player, while traveling up the court. They then run behind two players, thus the terminology, "pass and go behind two".

Upon reaching the other end of the court the drill turns into a 3-on-2 drill, with the person who shot the layup and the last passer returning to play defense. The ballhandler amongst the group of the 3 will retreat to the other end after attacking the goal. The two defenders attack the single defender resulting in a 2-on-1 to the other side. These remaining three players then execute a 3-man weave to the far baseline.

This drill became very popular amongst high school and small college coaches throughout the south and midwest as Yuhas introduced it on the summer camp circuit. He even introduced it at Mike Dunleavy's Los Angeles Lakers Camp in 1992. Today the drill is used in programs of all sizes across the country.

This drill was featured in the Hoops and Caroms International Playbook authored by Ed Yuhas in 1992, as well as More Five-Star Basketball Drills by Howard Garfinkel in 2003.
