= Basketball (1980 video game) =

1980 video game

- Box art by Jerrol Richardson
- Developer(s): Mattel Electronics
- Publisher(s): Mattel Electronics
- Designer(s): Ken Smith
- Programmer(s): Ken Smith
- Platform(s): Intellivision
- Release: August 25, 1980
- Genre(s): Sports (basketball)
- Mode(s): Multiplayer

Basketball (originally released as NBA Basketball) is a basketball video game produced by Mattel and released for its Intellivision system in 1980. The players each control a basketball team competing in four timed quarters of game play. Mattel obtained a license from National Basketball Association and used the NBA logo in its box art, making it the first basketball video game to be licensed by the NBA; however, the game does not use any official team or player names. It was sold by Sears for its private-label version of the Intellivision console, the "Super Video Arcade", without the NBA name or logo.

== Gameplay ==
Each player controls a three-man basketball team, actively controlling one team member at a time, with the computer controlling the other two. Like the real game of basketball, the player's team must score more points than the opponent's team by shooting more baskets and blocking opponent's shots on their basket. The game consists of four quarters, each a simulated twelve minutes in length. The pace of the game is governed by a simulated 24-second shot clock.

At the start of the quarter, the two players control the centers during the tip-off. The team who wins the tip-off begins on offense, with the player controlling the team member with the ball. Players on offense use the keypad to select where in the offensive half of the court they wish to pass the ball. If a computer-controlled offensive team member receives the pass, control passes to that team member. When attempting to shoot the ball at the basket, players may choose between a jump shot (which is less likely to be blocked, but only hits at close range) and a set shot (which can hit from long distances, but has a greater chance of being blocked).

On defense, the player controls one member of the team, considered the "captain". The defense can block shots, intercept passes and rebound missed shots, and computer-controlled defensive team members are able to steal the ball from the offense. When a defensive team member (either player- or computer-controlled) gets the ball, the player controls that team member and switches to the offensive controls.

If the score is tied at the end of the fourth quarter of play, a single five-minute overtime period is played.

=== Variations from standard basketball ===
Gameplay is on a simulated regulation-style full court, whereas traditional three-on-three basketball games typically use only a half-court setup. There are no foul shots in the game, nor are there three-point shots; all baskets, regardless of distance, are worth two points. Also, the shot clock resets not only after attempted shots and possession changes, but also upon completed passes. Theoretically, an offensive team can pass the ball continually and take only a single shot within a given quarter.

== Reception ==
Basketball was reviewed by Video magazine in its "Arcade Alley" column where it was praised for its "superb" passing system. Although the reviewers noted that the game lacked free throws and free agents, their general conclusion was that the game "[would] have fans cheering".

== Legacy ==
The game is included in the Intellivision Lives! compilation, as well as Microsoft's Game Room service, as simply Basketball.
