= List of Indiana Pacers seasons =

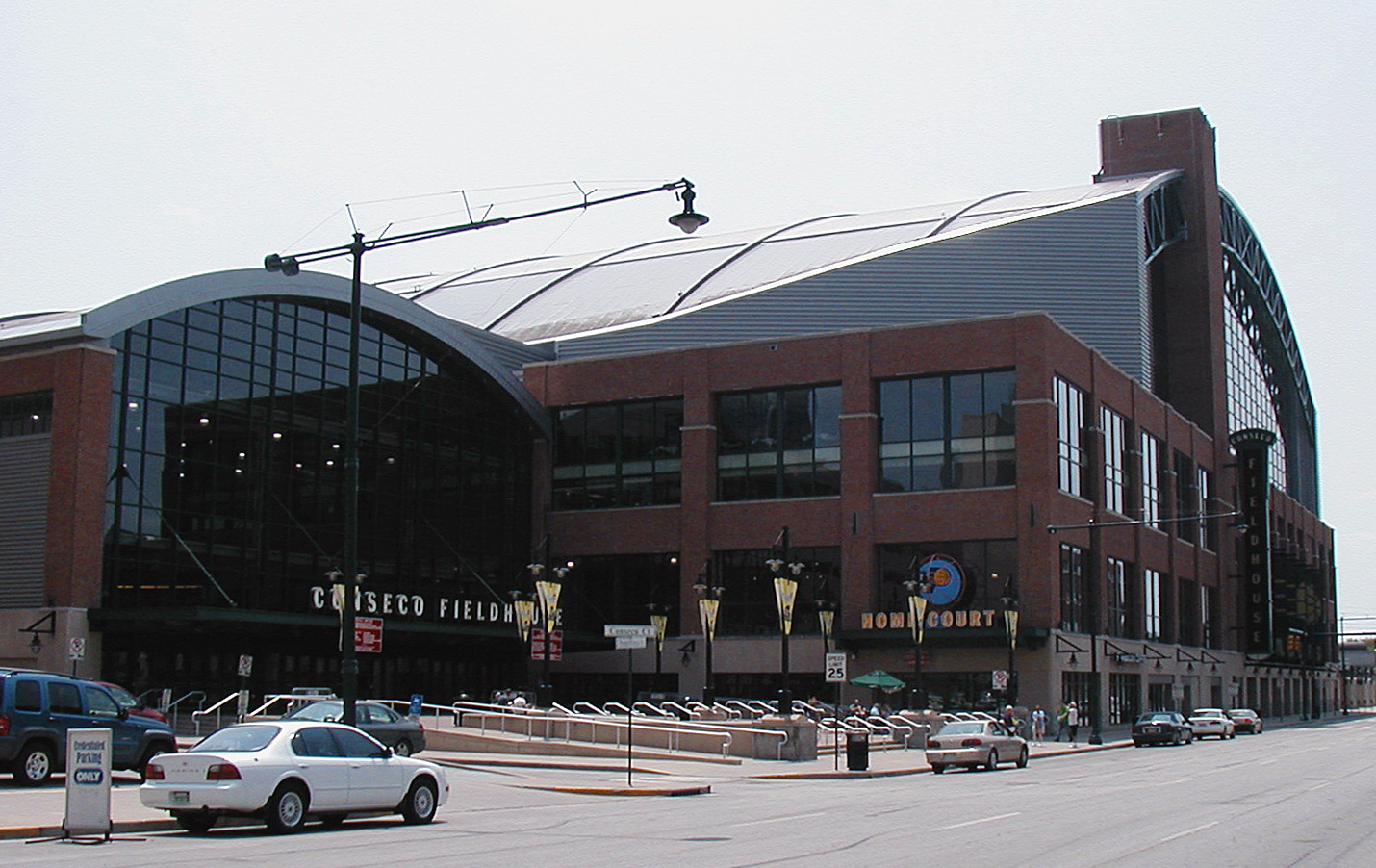
Gainbridge Fieldhouse has been home to the Pacers since 1999.

The Indiana Pacers are a professional basketball team based in Indianapolis. They are members of the Central Division of the Eastern Conference in the National Basketball Association (NBA). The Pacers were founded in 1967, originally as members of the American Basketball Association, where they were crowned league champions three times and made the playoffs in all of the nine seasons they participated in the league. They had five appearances in the ABA Finals during those nine years. The Pacers were led during the ABA days by two-time MVP Mel Daniels and by head coach Bobby Leonard.

The 1976–77 season marked the first season of NBA play for the Pacers and the team struggled early, compared to their ABA success. The Pacers only made it to the NBA playoffs three times in their first 13 seasons. The Pacers would not win their first playoff series until the 1993–94 season, which came against the Orlando Magic. It was during this time that the Pacers were led by 1987 draft pick, Reggie Miller, who entered the Basketball Hall of Fame in 2012. Miller would play for the Pacers until the 2005 season and with his help, the Pacers would go on to win one Eastern Conference championship, four Central Division championships, and make 15 playoff appearances.

Over the Pacers' 58 seasons of play they have made the playoffs 38 times (29 in the NBA and nine in the ABA). The Pacers have appeared in the NBA Eastern Conference finals 10 times (1994, 1995, 1998, 1999, 2000, 2004, 2013, 2014, 2024, 2025). They played in the 2000 NBA Finals against Kobe Bryant, Shaquille O'Neal and the Los Angeles Lakers, and again in the 2025 NBA Finals against Shai Gilgeous-Alexander and the Oklahoma City Thunder. The Pacers are one of 10 franchises to have never won an NBA championship and the only Central Division team without at least one championship title.

== Table key ==
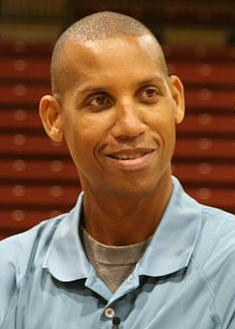
Hall of Fame player Reggie Miller was a member of the Pacers from 1987 to 2005.

| ASG MVP | All-Star Game Most Valuable Player |
| COY | Coach of the Year |
| Finish | Final position in league or division standings |
| GB | Games behind first-place team in division (Note: The formula is as follows: $\mathrm{Games}\ \mathrm{behind} = \frac{(\mathrm{Team A's}\ \mathrm{wins}-\mathrm{Team B's}\ \mathrm{wins}) + (\mathrm{Team B's}\ \mathrm{losses} - \mathrm{Team A's}\ \mathrm{losses})}{\mathrm{2}}$) |
| Losses | Number of regular season losses |
| EOY | Executive of the Year |
| JWKC | J. Walter Kennedy Citizenship |
| MVP | Most Valuable Player |
| ROY | Rookie of the Year |
| SMOY | Sixth Man of the Year |
| Wins | Number of regular season wins |
| Win% | Winning percentage |

== Seasons ==
| ABA champions | NBA champions | Conference champions | Division champions | Playoff berth | Play-in berth |

| Season | League | Conference | Finish (Note: The Finish column lists regular season results and excludes postseason play.) | Division | Finish | W (Note: The Wins and Losses columns list regular season results and exclude any postseason play. Regular and postseason records are combined only below the table.) | L | Win% | GB | Playoffs | Awards | Head coach |
|---|---|---|---|---|---|---|---|---|---|---|---|---|
| 1967–68 | ABA | — | — | Eastern | 3rd | 38 | 40 | .487 | 16 | Lost division semifinals (Pipers) 3–0 | | Larry Staverman |
| 1968–69 | ABA | — | — | Eastern | 1st | 44 | 34 | .564 | — | Won division semifinals (Colonels) 4–3; Won division finals (Floridians) 4–1; Lost ABA Finals (Oaks) 4–1 | Mel Daniels (MVP) | Larry Staverman; Bobby Leonard |
| 1969–70 | ABA | — | — | Eastern | 1st | 59 | 25 | .702 | — | Won division semifinals (Cougars) 4–0; Won division finals (Colonels) 4–1; Won ABA Finals (Stars) 4–2 | Roger Brown (PMVP) | Bobby Leonard |
| 1970–71 | ABA | — | — | Western | 1st | 58 | 26 | .690 | — | Won division semifinals (Pros) 4–0; Lost division finals (Stars) 4–3 | Mel Daniels (MVP, ASG MVP) | Bobby Leonard |
| 1971–72 | ABA | — | — | Western | 2nd | 47 | 37 | .560 | 13 | Won division semifinals (Rockets) 4–3; Won division finals (Stars) 4–3; Won ABA Finals (Nets) 4–2 | Freddie Lewis (PMVP) | Bobby Leonard |
| 1972–73 | ABA | — | — | Western | 2nd | 51 | 33 | .607 | 4 | Won division semifinals (Rockets) 4–1; Won division finals (Stars) 4–2; Won ABA Finals (Colonels) 4–3 | George McGinnis (PMVP) | Bobby Leonard |
| 1973–74 | ABA | — | — | Western | 2nd | 46 | 38 | .548 | 5 | Won division semifinals (Spurs) 4–3; Lost division finals (Stars) 4–3 | | Bobby Leonard |
| 1974–75 | ABA | — | — | Western | 3rd | 45 | 39 | .536 | 20 | Won division semifinals (Spurs) 4–2; Won division finals (Nuggets) 4–3; Lost ABA Finals (Colonels) 4–1 | George McGinnis (MVP) | Bobby Leonard |
| 1975–76 | ABA | — | — | — (Note: The league abolished division play during the season.) | 5th | 39 | 45 | .464 | 21 | Lost first round (Colonels) 2–1 | | Bobby Leonard |
| 1976–77 (Note: The franchise joined the National Basketball Association in the ABA–NBA merger.) | NBA | Western | 9th | Midwest | 5th | 36 | 46 | .439 | 14 | — | | Bobby Leonard |
| 1977–78 | NBA | Western | 10th | Midwest | 5th | 31 | 51 | .378 | 17 | — | | Bobby Leonard |
| 1978–79 | NBA | Western | 8th | Midwest | 3rd | 38 | 44 | .463 | 10 | — | | Bobby Leonard |
| 1979–80 | NBA | Eastern | 8th | Central | 4th | 37 | 45 | .451 | 13 | — | | Bobby Leonard |
| 1980–81 | NBA | Eastern | 6th | Central | 3rd | 44 | 38 | .537 | 16 | Lost first round (76ers) 2–0 | Jack McKinney (COY) | Jack McKinney |
| 1981–82 | NBA | Eastern | 8th | Central | 4th | 35 | 47 | .427 | 20 | — | | Jack McKinney |
| 1982–83 | NBA | Eastern | 11th | Central | 6th | 20 | 62 | .244 | 31 | — | | Jack McKinney |
| 1983–84 | NBA | Eastern | 11th | Central | 6th | 26 | 56 | .317 | 24 | — | | Jack McKinney |
| 1984–85 | NBA | Eastern | 11th | Central | 6th | 22 | 60 | .268 | 37 | — | | George Irvine |
| 1985–86 | NBA | Eastern | 10th | Central | 6th | 26 | 56 | .317 | 31 | — | | George Irvine |
| 1986–87 | NBA | Eastern | 7th | Central | 4th | 41 | 41 | .500 | 16 | Lost first round (Hawks) 3–1 | Chuck Person (ROY) | Jack Ramsay |
| 1987–88 | NBA | Eastern | 9th | Central | 6th | 38 | 44 | .463 | 16 | — | | Jack Ramsay |
| 1988–89 | NBA | Eastern | 10th | Central | 6th | 28 | 54 | .341 | 35 | — | | Jack Ramsay; Mel Daniels; George Irvine; Dick Versace |
| 1989–90 | NBA | Eastern | 8th | Central | 4th | 42 | 40 | .512 | 17 | Lost first round (Pistons) 3–0 | | Dick Versace |
| 1990–91 | NBA | Eastern | 7th | Central | 5th | 41 | 41 | .500 | 20 | Lost first round (Celtics) 3–2 | Detlef Schrempf (SIX) | Dick Versace; Bob Hill |
| 1991–92 | NBA | Eastern | 7th | Central | 4th | 40 | 42 | .488 | 27 | Lost first round (Celtics) 3–0 | Detlef Schrempf (SIX) | Bob Hill |
| 1992–93 | NBA | Eastern | 8th | Central | 5th | 41 | 41 | .500 | 16 | Lost first round (Knicks) 3–1 | | Bob Hill |
| 1993–94 | NBA | Eastern | 5th | Central | 3rd | 47 | 35 | .573 | 10 | Won first round (Magic) 3–0; Won conference semifinals (Hawks) 4–2; Lost conference finals (Knicks) 4–3 | | Larry Brown |
| 1994–95 | NBA | Eastern | 2nd | Central | 1st | 52 | 30 | .634 | — | Won first round (Hawks) 3–0; Won conference semifinals (Knicks) 4–3; Lost conference finals (Magic) 4–3 | | Larry Brown |
| 1995–96 | NBA | Eastern | 3rd | Central | 2nd | 52 | 30 | .634 | 20 | Lost first round (Hawks) 3–2 | | Larry Brown |
| 1996–97 | NBA | Eastern | 10th | Central | 6th | 39 | 43 | .476 | 30 | — | | Larry Brown |
| 1997–98 | NBA | Eastern | 3rd | Central | 2nd | 58 | 24 | .707 | 4 | Won first round (Cavaliers) 3–1; Won conference semifinals (Knicks) 4–1; Lost conference finals (Bulls) 4–3 | Larry Bird (COY) | Larry Bird |
| 1998–99 (Note: Due to a lockout, the season did not start until February 5, 1999, and all 29 teams played a shortened 50 game regular season schedule.) | NBA | Eastern | 2nd | Central | 1st | 33 | 17 | .660 | — | Won first round (Bucks) 3–0; Won conference semifinals (76ers) 4–0; Lost conference finals (Knicks) 4–2 | | Larry Bird |
| 1999–00 | NBA | Eastern | 1st | Central | 1st | 56 | 26 | .683 | — | Won first round (Bucks) 3–2; Won conference semifinals (76ers) 4–2; Won conference finals (Knicks) 4–2; Lost NBA Finals (Lakers) 4–2 | Jalen Rose (MIP) | Larry Bird |
| 2000–01 | NBA | Eastern | 8th | Central | 4th | 41 | 41 | .500 | 11 | Lost first round (76ers) 3–1 | | Isiah Thomas |
| 2001–02 | NBA | Eastern | 8th | Central | 4th | 42 | 40 | .512 | 8 | Lost first round (Nets) 3–2 | Jermaine O'Neal (MIP) | Isiah Thomas |
| 2002–03 | NBA | Eastern | 3rd | Central | 2nd | 48 | 34 | .585 | 2 | Lost first round (Celtics) 4–2 | | Isiah Thomas |
| 2003–04 | NBA | Eastern | 1st | Central | 1st | 61 | 21 | .744 | — | Won first round (Celtics) 4–0; Won conference semifinals (Heat) 4–2; Lost conference finals (Pistons) 4–2 | Ron Artest (DPOY); Reggie Miller (JWKC) | Rick Carlisle |
| 2004–05 | NBA | Eastern | 6th | Central | 3rd | 44 | 38 | .537 | 10 | Won first round (Celtics) 4–3; Lost conference semifinals (Pistons) 4–2 | | Rick Carlisle |
| 2005–06 | NBA | Eastern | 6th | Central | 3rd | 41 | 41 | .500 | 23 | Lost first round (Nets) 4–2 | | Rick Carlisle |
| 2006–07 | NBA | Eastern | 10th | Central | 4th | 35 | 47 | .427 | 18 | — | | Rick Carlisle |
| 2007–08 | NBA | Eastern | 9th | Central | 3rd | 36 | 46 | .439 | 23 | — | | Jim O'Brien |
| 2008–09 | NBA | Eastern | 9th | Central | 4th | 36 | 46 | .439 | 30 | — | Danny Granger (MIP) | Jim O'Brien |
| 2009–10 | NBA | Eastern | 10th | Central | 4th | 32 | 50 | .390 | 29 | — | | Jim O'Brien |
| 2010–11 | NBA | Eastern | 8th | Central | 2nd | 37 | 45 | .451 | 25 | Lost first round (Bulls) 4–1 | | Jim O'Brien; Frank Vogel |
| 2011–12 (Note: Due to a lockout, the season did not start until December 25, 2011 and all 30 teams played a shortened 66 game regular season schedule.) | NBA | Eastern | 3rd | Central | 2nd | 42 | 24 | .636 | 8 | Won first round (Magic) 4–1; Lost conference semifinals (Heat) 4–2 | Larry Bird (EOY) | Frank Vogel |
| 2012–13 | NBA | Eastern | 3rd | Central | 1st | 49 | 32 | .605 | — | Won first round (Hawks) 4–2; Won conference semifinals (Knicks) 4–2; Lost conference finals (Heat) 4–3 | Paul George (MIP) | Frank Vogel |
| 2013–14 | NBA | Eastern | 1st | Central | 1st | 56 | 26 | .683 | — | Won first round (Hawks) 4–3; Won conference semifinals (Wizards) 4–2; Lost conference finals (Heat) 4–2 | | Frank Vogel |
| 2014–15 | NBA | Eastern | 9th | Central | 4th | 38 | 44 | .463 | 15 | — | | Frank Vogel |
| 2015–16 | NBA | Eastern | 7th | Central | 2nd | 45 | 37 | .549 | 12 | Lost first round (Raptors) 4–3 | | Frank Vogel |
| 2016–17 | NBA | Eastern | 7th | Central | 3rd | 42 | 40 | .512 | 9 | Lost first round (Cavaliers) 4–0 | | Nate McMillan |
| 2017–18 | NBA | Eastern | 5th | Central | 2nd | 48 | 34 | .585 | 2 | Lost first round (Cavaliers) 4–3 | Victor Oladipo (MIP) | Nate McMillan |
| 2018–19 | NBA | Eastern | 5th | Central | 2nd | 48 | 34 | .585 | 12 | Lost first round (Celtics) 4–0 | | Nate McMillan |
| 2019–20 | NBA | Eastern | 4th | Central | 2nd | 45 | 28 | .616 | 11 | Lost first round (Heat) 4–0 | Malcolm Brogdon (JWKC) | Nate McMillan |
| 2020–21 | NBA | Eastern | 9th | Central | 2nd | 34 | 38 | .472 | 12 | — | | Nate Bjorkgren |
| 2021–22 | NBA | Eastern | 13th | Central | 4th | 25 | 57 | .305 | 28.5 | — | | Rick Carlisle |
| 2022–23 | NBA | Eastern | 11th | Central | 4th | 35 | 47 | .427 | 23 | — | | Rick Carlisle |
| 2023–24 | NBA | Eastern | 6th | Central | 3rd | 47 | 35 | .573 | 2 | Won first round (Bucks) 4–2; Won conference semifinals (Knicks) 4–3; Lost conference finals (Celtics) 4–0 | | Rick Carlisle |
| 2024–25 | NBA | Eastern | 4th | Central | 2nd | 50 | 32 | .610 | 14 | Won first round (Bucks) 4–1; Won conference semifinals (Cavaliers) 4–1; Won conference finals (Knicks) 4–2; Lost NBA Finals (Thunder) 4–3 | | Rick Carlisle |
| 2025–26 | NBA | Eastern | 14th | Central | 5th | 19 | 63 | .232 | 41 | — | | Rick Carlisle |

=== All-time records ===
| Statistic | Wins | Losses | W–L% |
|---|---|---|---|
| ABA regular season record (1967–1976) | 427 | 317 | .574 |
| NBA regular season record (1976–present) | 1,999 | 2,033 | .496 |
| All-time regular season record (1967–present) | 2,426 | 2,350 | .508 |
| ABA postseason record (1967–1976) | 69 | 50 | .580 |
| NBA postseason record (1976–present) | 138 | 143 | .491 |
| All-time postseason record (1967–present) | 207 | 193 | .518 |
| All-time regular and postseason record (1967–present) | 2,633 | 2,543 | .509 |
