= Basketball Nightmare =

1989 video game

- Cover art
- Developer: Aicom
- Publisher: Sega
- Designers: Tommy Ha Okorarenai; Ore Tensai Yamguchi; Watashi Tomocyan Ga Iina; Yasuo Te Wakatuki
- Composers: Tokiwa Dota; Ice Nagakura
- Platform: Master System
- Release: EU: December 1989
- Genres: Sports (basketball)
- Modes: Single-player, multiplayer

Basketball Nightmare is a 1989 sports video game for the Master System. The game sees the player playing games of basketball against various different teams made up of different monsters, primarily hailing from Japanese mythology.

== Gameplay ==
The Yama-uba (witches) team's home basketball court is secluded in a bamboo forest.

The player is the captain of the hometown basketball team. Before he could prepare his team to win the all-American tournament, he started having strange dreams about playing basketball in exotic locations against strange creatures. These creatures include werewolves, kappas, hitotsume-kozō, vampires, Yama-uba, and tengu. Each opposing player is represented in a super-deformed anime style.

The player can replay the matches that they lost until they finally beat the opposing team. The player can choose between a 15-minute game, a 30-minute game, or a 45-minute game. Several basketball fouls can be called; including traveling, charging (the player with the ball intentionally collides with a defender), and pushing (the defending player intentionally colliding with the ball handler).

There is an alternate mode that allows players to play "international basketball" against countries like the US, Japan, Cuba, China, the German Democratic Republic, the Soviet Union, Canada, and France.

== Reception ==
Both Zero magazine and Console XS gave it an 88%.

== See also ==
- Mutant League Football
