= Back screen =

Basketball strategy

A back screen is a basketball maneuver involving two players, called a cutter and a screener. It is also known as the rip screen. The screener remains stationary on the court while the cutter moves toward the basket and attempts to use the screener to separate himself from his defender.

== Technique ==
Back screens can be used in a set offense or when a team has limited time left to score. In this play, the screener positions himself with his back to the basket on the same side of the court as the cutter. The cutter positions himself outside of and above the screener. "Outside" implies that the cutter is closer to the sideline than the screener. "Above" implies that the cutter is closer to the midcourt line than the screener. Neither player has the ball. With the screener completely stationary, the cutter moves toward the basket and passes close enough to the screener that they almost touch shoulders. If the cut is properly made, the player defending the cutter will be disrupted by the screener (who has not moved while setting the screen) and the cutter will have an opportunity to receive a pass very near the basket.

A back-screen becomes effective when the cutter is defended very closely. An over-playing defender often has their back turned to the basket and cannot see the screen being set. Without time to adjust, the defender will collide with the screener.

Defending this play requires the attention of the screener's defender, who must alert teammates to the screen. Switching and ball pressure can disrupt back screen actions. However, when the defense switches, it can lead to a mismatch opportunity for opponents.

== Notable uses ==
Stephen Curry of the Golden State Warriors is known for setting back screens for teammates, as opponents guard him closely and will leave cutters open to defend him. Back screens are also key components in Gregg Popovich's motion offense with the San Antonio Spurs and in the Spain pick and roll, a screening action created by Sergio Scariolo, head coach of the Spanish national team.
