= Pat Riley Basketball =

1990 video game

- Developer: Sega
- Publisher: Sega
- Composer: Hikoshi Hashimoto
- Platform: Genesis
- Release: JP: March 2, 1990; NA: August 1990; EU: 1990
- Genre: Traditional basketball simulator
- Modes: Single-player, multiplayer (for both Exhibition and Tournament modes)

Pat Riley Basketball is a basketball video game which was released for the Sega Genesis, for the Mega Drive in Japan on March 2, 1990 under the title Super Real Basketball (スーパーリアルバスケットボール, Sūpā Riaru Basukettobōru) and Europe under the same title as Japan. It was released in August 1990 in the United States. It was also developed for the Master System, but was never released. Pat Riley was the coach of the Los Angeles Lakers at the time of the game's release. There are two modes and eight different teams to choose from.

== Gameplay ==
There are eight teams to choose from:

Pat Riley Basketball	Super Real Basketball	World Cup Basketball
L.A. Hoops	L.A. Rainbows	Team U.S.A.
Detroit Jets	Detroit Jets	Team Japan
Dallas Wings	Dallas Wings	Team Brazil
Seattle Bears	Seattle Rams	Team China
Boston Bashers	Boston Bug	Team Italy
N.Y. Busters	N.Y. Busters	Team Mexico
Denver Jammers	Denver Rocks	Team England
Houston Rebels	Houston Legs	Team Korea

Like regulation basketball, there are four quarters, but the player can set the length of the quarters (five, twelve, or twenty minutes per quarter). The game supports two players. Its modes are exhibition and tournament.

Reception

Review score
Publication	Score
GameSpot	3.5/10
