= Donkey basketball =

American sport

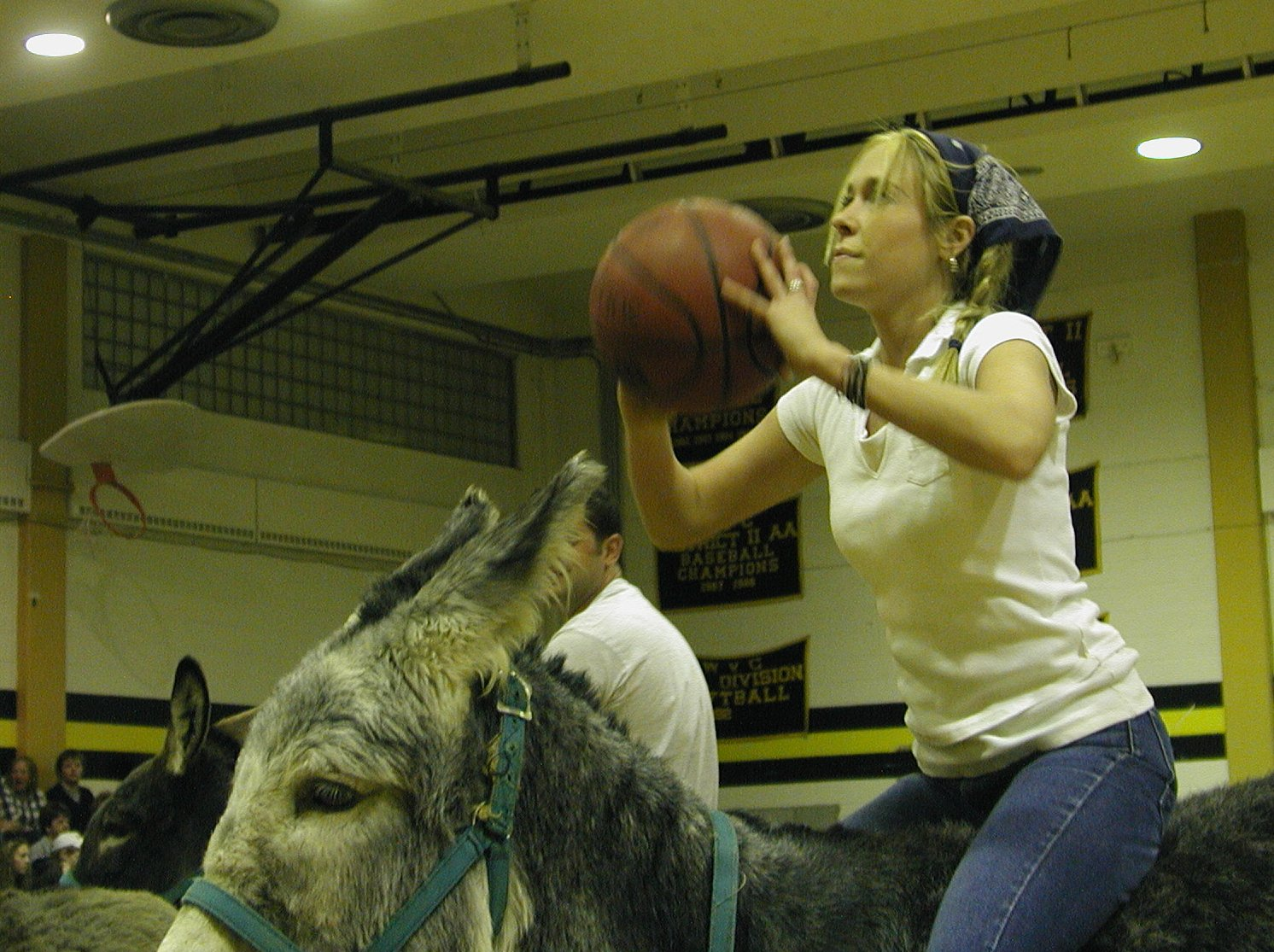
Photograph of a donkey basketball player.

Donkey basketball is a variation of the standard basketball game, played on a standard basketball court, but in which the players ride donkeys. A donkey basketball game is usually staged as a one-time fundraising event, typically in public schools. Commercial farms provide donkeys and equipment, splitting the proceeds with the hiring party. Donkey basketball has been practiced in the United States since the 1930s.

Donkey basketball has been targeted by animal rights activists, who claim the sport is cruel to animals. Critics cite problems caused by inexperienced participants handling the donkeys, such as the beating and kicking of donkeys by the riders and donkey owners, and the intentional starvation of donkeys a few days prior to a basketball game to prevent them from urinating or defecating on the basketball courts. Promoters claim the events are "supervised" and the animals are "treated humanely."

A related game, called Donkey Baseball, was popular in the 1930s, with all players, except the batter, pitcher and catcher, straddled on donkeys. The batter would mount a donkey when running bases too. A fielder could dismount a donkey to pick up a ball, but must continue to hold the reins, and must remount before throwing. If he did not, the opposing team would be awarded the base. The game was created in 1934 by Ray L. Doan, and was the subject of a 1935 short film.
