= Future Basketball =

1990 sports video game

- SNES cover art
- Developers: The Evil 3 (Amiga, ST); Hudson Soft (SNES)
- Publishers: EU: Hewson Consultants; NA: Hudson Soft
- Platforms: Amiga, Atari ST, Super NES
- Release: Amiga, Atari ST: EU: 1990; SNES: NA: November 1991
- Genre: Sports
- Modes: Single-player; Multiplayer

Future Basketball is a futuristic basketball video game released by Hewson Consultants for the Amiga and Atari ST in 1990. It was ported to the Super Nintendo Entertainment System (SNES) by Hudson Soft in 1991 as Bill Laimbeer's Combat Basketball. It was the first basketball game released for the SNES. The game stars Bill Laimbeer, who played for the Detroit Pistons of the NBA during a time when the team was notorious for dirty, physical play. The Pistons during this time were also known as the "Bad Boys" for the amount of contact they would initiate. They would often hit or strike opponents in an attempt to intimidate and harm opponents.

The game takes place in the year 2031. Bill Laimbeer has become commissioner of a basketball league, fired the referees and created a style of play without rules. There are no fouls and use of weapons is perfectly legal.

== Gameplay ==
The game utilizes an uncommon overhead view of the court. Unlike real basketball, players can physically check each other on the court without the threat of personal or team fouls. Destructive items such as bombs frequently appear on the court.

A season lasts 14 games without any playoff games. After each season, the top two teams in each league advance to the league above, and the bottom two teams in each league get moved down to the league below. Ties are broken by beginning season standings. If two teams finish the season with the same record, the one that was ranked higher at the beginning of the season will be ranked highest. The player starts out his career in the Third Division and must work his way up to the Super League; where the best teams vie for league supremacy.

== Reception ==
Reception

Review scores
Publication	Score
AllGame	1/5 (SNES)
GamePro	2/5 (SNES)

=== Amiga, Atari ST ===
Future Basketball was compared negatively to Speedball. CU Amiga said: "But where it really comes second [...] is in its scrolling which is not quite as smooth making things a little difficult to focus on at times. Zzap!64 wrote: "Future Basketball looks like Speedball, but doesn't play like it. Zinging balls off the walls in this game leads to a dull throw-in, and scoring baskets isn't as exciting."

=== SNES ===
Bret Alan Weiss, writing for Allgame, gave the game a negative review, criticizing the graphics, sounds and controls. Scoring the game one star out of five, he commented that these and other faults "mar what could have been a guilty pleasure." Game Informer's Jeff Marchiafava had a more positive view of the game on his list of "Weirdest Celebrity-Based Video Games."

Time Extension listed Combat Basketball as one of the worst SNES games.
