= All-Pro Basketball =

1989 video game

All-Pro Basketball Zenbei! Pro Basketball
- North American cover art
- Developer(s): Aicom
- Publisher(s): Vic Tokai
- Platform(s): NES
- Release: JP: July 21, 1989; NA: December 1989
- Genre(s): Traditional basketball with arcade-like elements
- Mode(s): Single-player; Multiplayer

All-Pro Basketball, known as Zenbei!! Pro Basketball in Japan, is a basketball video-game developed by Aicom and published by Vic Tokai for the Nintendo Entertainment System. It is played using two teams of five players on a full-length basketball court, and a roster of eight different fictional teams.

== Gameplay ==
There are four modes of gameplay. One-player, which pits the player in a solo match against a computer opponent. Two-player, which is a co-op match against a computer opponent. Versus, which is a two player mode that pits the players against each other. And finally, Watch, which allows the player to watch a computer-controlled match. The court is displayed in a vertical fashion, from a top-down perspective, revealing only half of the court at a time. If the ball travels past the half-court line, the screen goes black temporarily and changes over to the other half of the court (which looks identical, save for the color of the floorboards). This is done to alert the player that they have travelled to a different side of the court. When a player attempts a slam dunk, gameplay will pause and cut to a detailed animation of the maneuver.

== Teams ==
- New York Slicks (New York Knicks)
- Chicago Zephyrs (Chicago Bulls)
- Boston Redcoats (Boston Celtics)
- Los Angeles Breakers (Los Angeles Lakers)
- Dallas Stallions (Dallas Mavericks)
- Phoenix Wings (Phoenix Suns)
- Seattle Sonics (Seattle SuperSonics)
- San Francisco Bayriders (Golden State Warriors)

== Reception ==
Stan Stepanic of Game Freaks 365 rated this as the second best basketball title on the NES, citing reasons such as its innovative usage of a vertically scrolling court and a well-programmed, computer-AI defense. His score in its gameplay category was nearly a perfect 10. He states: "It's definitely worth a look for even the casual NES gamer, and I assure you if you take the time to learn it's intricacies, you'll be happy in the end".
