= GBA Championship Basketball: Two-on-Two =

1986 video game

- Developer: Dynamix
- Publisher: Activision
- Producer: Scott Orr
- Designers: Troy A. Lyndon; Scott Orr; John Cutter
- Artists: Scott Orr; John Cutter; Mark Madland
- Composer: Tommy V. Dunbar
- Platforms: MS-DOS, Amiga, Apple II, Apple IIGS, Amstrad CPC, Atari ST, ZX Spectrum, Commodore 64
- Release: 1986
- Genre: Sports

GBA Championship Basketball: Two-on-Two is a sports video game for IBM PC compatibles Amiga, Apple II, Apple IIGS, Amstrad CPC, Atari ST, ZX Spectrum, and Commodore 64. It was developed by Dynamix and published in 1986 by Activision.

== Gameplay ==
From a camera located flying over the center of the court the game featured a two on two basketball game, allowing one or two players.

== Reception ==
GBA was Activision's second best-selling Commodore game as of late 1987. The Apple IIGS version of the game was reviewed in 1988 in Dragon #129 by Hartley, Patricia, and Kirk Lesser in "The Role of Computers" column. The reviewers gave the game 4 out of 5 stars. Computer Gaming World praised the Commodore 64 version of GBA for improving on One on One: Dr. J vs. Larry Bird by adding a full court, teammate, and league play. Compute!'s Gazette praised the "developed with care" Commodore 64 graphics and playability. The magazine concluded that "Two-On-Two offers a great deal of fun to fans of fast-action arcade-style games" and "a fine new addition" to Activison's library. Compute! called the Apple IIGS version "a delightful game whether you're playing or just watching", praising the graphics and sound.
