= Stutter step =

Footwork technique in tennis and other sports

A stutter step is a footwork technique in tennis and other sports.

The stutter step (rapid small steps) is basically running forward with small steps while squatting, having the back perpendicular to the ground, and having the racquet up in front. It is a technique used to approach the net after a strong approach shot in preparation for a volley. It allows the player to be in a stable ready position while moving forward and creating a higher percentage volley.

== Common meaning in modern usage ==
Although the term is mainly used in tennis, it has also become a modern term that is used commonly meaning to "unsurely make a decision or perform a job or activity." For example, you could "stutter step" in a decision, or take slow, unsure steps and be cautious towards it instead of making up one's mind to go for it.

== In basketball ==
In basketball, the stutter step is a common warm-up drill where you shuffle and scuff your feet in a quick moving motion across a length of flooring. This warm-up is supposed to keep the players alert and help them prepare to defend players in a real game, since the stutter step is a littler version of shuffling.

== In track and field ==
In track and field, a stutter step is usually related to an event where foot placement needs to be precise: shortened adjustment steps leading up to a hurdle, or on a runway event where the final step initiates the jump, vault or throw.

== In video games ==
RTS games have players issuing orders to units on a game field. Some units are unable to attack while moving. Stutter-stepping is when units are ordered to move the moment their attack animation begins, canceling the attack's animation while still allowing the attack to happen, thereby allowing them to follow or flee from enemy units while attacking.
