= Shuffle offense =

Offensive strategy in basketball

The shuffle offense is an offensive strategy in basketball, developed in the early 1950s by Bruce Drake at the University of Oklahoma. It was later used by Bob Spear, who was the first head basketball coach of the United States Air Force Academy in 1957–71. The shuffle offense has all five players rotate in each of the five shuffle positions. This offense would be an option for a team that has good ball-handlers but does not have height or a strong dominant post player (which may be why Spear used it at Air Force, which has a height restriction).

Coach Dean Smith of the University of North Carolina at Chapel Hill also taught the shuffle offense.
