= Basket interference =

Rule in basketball

In basketball, basket interference is the violation of (a) touching the ball or any part of the basket (including the net) while the ball is on the rim of the basket, (b) touching the ball when it is entirely within the cylinder extending upwards from the rim, (c) reaching up through the basket from below and touching the ball, whether it is inside or outside the cylinder, or (d) pulling down on the rim of the basket so that it contacts the ball before returning to its original position, or during a shot attempt. How the ball gets into the cylinder or onto the basket is irrelevant under high school and NCAA rules; e.g., a pass touched within the cylinder is basket interference, even though such a play may not score a goal. This similar play under (W)NBA rules would not be basket interference.

There is one exception to the above: if a player dunks the ball, they may maintain contact with the ball into the cylinder or grab the rim (momentarily) without penalty.

When a basket interference violation is called against the defending team, the shooting team is awarded the points for the field goal as if it had been made. When a basket interference violation is called against the shooting team, no points are scored and the ball is given to the defending team.

Basket interference by the defensive team and goaltending are the only violations in basketball for which points are automatically awarded.

FIBA has rules on basket interference. FIBA Art.31.2.4 (2014) – interference occurs under certain conditions when a player touches the ball, basket, rim, or backboard in a motion that "the ball has been prevented from entering the basket or has been caused to enter the basket."
