= Harlem Globetrotters (video game) =

1990 video game

- NES cover art
- Developer: Softie
- Publisher: GameTek
- Designer: Bruce Sandig
- Composer: Rob Wallace
- Platforms: MS-DOS, NES
- Release: MS-DOS: NA: 1990; NES: NA: March 1991
- Genre: Sports
- Modes: Single-player, multiplayer

Harlem Globetrotters is a sports video game published by GameTek for MS-DOS compatible operating systems in 1990 and the Nintendo Entertainment System in 1991. The player controls the Harlem Globetrotters basketball team. A Sega Genesis conversion was planned but never released.

== Gameplay ==
Unlike most other basketball video games, there is only an exhibition mode in this game where the player can play as either the Harlem Globetrotters or their long-time rivals, the Washington Generals. The player can even pull down the referee's pants or trip the ref when a free throw has been called when playing as the Harlem Globetrotters.
