= Memphis Tigers basketball =

Memphis Tigers basketball may refer to either of the basketball teams that represent the University of Memphis:

- Memphis Tigers men's basketball
- Memphis Tigers women's basketball
