= Air ball =

Basketball shot that hits nothing

In basketball, an air ball is an unblocked shot that misses the net, rim and backboard entirely.

== Origin ==
The Oxford English Dictionary cites earliest printed use of "air ball" in a 29 January 1967 article from the (Hayward, Calif.) Daily Review, which reads: "Cal State, four times lofting air balls at an orange basket that may as well have been painted invisible."

== Crowd behavior and consequences ==
In collegiate basketball, home crowds were found to initially chant when the air ball shot was made from a distance and when it resulted in a lost possession. Home crowds were also more persistent in their chants when the shot was made further from the basket. An archival exploration showed that away players who shot an air ball had a lower success rate in the shot immediately after, as compared to home players launching the same shot; however, this difference was unrelated to the chant.

== Examples ==
In a 106 to 89 loss to the Atlanta Hawks on December 28, 1974, Elmore Smith of the Los Angeles Lakers had an unusual performance in a game where he made only one of 11 free throw attempts. He missed three consecutive shots from the free throw line (under the now defunct "three to make two" rule in the NBA at the time), all three of which failed to hit anything but the floor.

In another example, a three-point shot by the Brooklyn Nets' Kevin Durant in Game 7 of the 2021 Eastern Conference semifinals, that would have put the Nets ahead of the Milwaukee Bucks, 114 to 113 with less than one second left, was an air ball.

In a EuroCup match between KK Partizan and Darüşşafaka Basketbol, Rade Zagorac attempted a three-point-shot buzzer beater that would have put Partizan ahead of Darussafaka, 66 to 65 with 5 seconds left but ended in an air ball.

== See also ==
- Brick (basketball)
- Whiff (baseball)
- Whiff (tennis)
