= Jordan vs. Bird: One on One =

1988 sports video game

- Developers: Electronic Arts; Rare (NES)
- Publishers: Electronic Arts; Milton Bradley (NES)
- Composers: Rob Hubbard (C64/MS-DOS); David Wise (NES); Mark Van Hecke (Game Boy); Michael Bartlow (Genesis)
- Platforms: Commodore 64, Game Boy, Genesis, NES, MS-DOS
- Release: 1988
- Genre: Sports (basketball)

Jordan vs. Bird: One on One is a basketball video game developed by Electronic Arts as the sequel to One on One: Dr. J vs. Larry Bird from 1983. Jordan vs. Bird was initially published in 1988 for the Commodore 64 and MS-DOS, then versions were released for the Game Boy, Genesis, and Nintendo Entertainment System. The NES port was done by Rare and published by the Milton Bradley Company. There is also a handheld electronic game from Tiger Electronics.

== Gameplay ==
Michael Jordan of the Chicago Bulls and Larry Bird of the Boston Celtics are the only two players in the game, which allows the player to participate in a one-on-one basketball game, as either Bird or Jordan. Minigames include a slam dunk contest for Jordan, where the player can choose from ten distinctive dunks, and a three-point contest for Bird.

== Reception ==
Mega placed the game at #7 in their list of the "10 Worst Mega Drive Games of All Time". Mean Machines magazine gave the game an overall score of 40 out of 100, faulting all aspects of the game other than sound and presentation while concluding that the game is "a substandard sports simulation that won't even appeal to basketball fans".
