= Prison Ball =

- Directed by: Jason Moriarty
- Written by: Jeff Scheftel
- Produced by: Jason Moriarty, Stephen Belafonte, Hugh O'Sullivan, Michael Butler and Theo Rozsa
- Release date: 2004
- Running time: 90 minutes
- Country: United States
- Language: English

Prison Ball is a 2004 American documentary film directed by Jason Moriarty and written by Jeff Scheftel. The 90-minute film is narrated by Ice-T.

Prison Ball is about prison basketball as practiced by prisoners within prison walls. The documentary interviews various inmates and prison officials and specialists on the matter and tackles as well "prison basketball leagues" operating within prison systems. It focuses on four Louisiana state prison teams, and was shot mainly in New Orleans, Louisiana, United States.

== Awards and nominations ==
In 2004, it was nominated for the Hollywood Film Festival awards for the category "Hollywood Documentary Award".
