= Michael Jordan in Flight =

1993 sports video game

- Developer: Electronic Arts
- Publisher: Electronic Arts
- Producer: Jim Rushing
- Designers: Michael Suarez; Greg Zumwalt; Michael Jordan
- Composers: Krisjan Hatlelid; Edwin Dolinski; Alistair Hirst
- Platform: MS-DOS
- Release: 1993
- Genre: Sports (basketball)
- Mode: Single-player

Michael Jordan in Flight is a 1993 basketball video game for MS-DOS compatible operating systems developed by and published by Electronic Arts. The game is endorsed by Michael Jordan, but has no NBA licensed players or teams due to Jordan having opted out of the players association license. It is one of the first sports video games to use a 3D game engine.

== Gameplay ==
The game features 3x3 basketball with a 3D, multi-angle camera. The player controls Michael Jordan and two teammates in exhibition or tournament matches against seven other teams. The player can control Jordan exclusively, or choose to play as the friendly player closest to the basketball. The left mouse button is used to pass the basketball, while the right mouse button attempts a field goal. Four preset offensive plays are available to the player (low post cutter, high post cutter, give 'n' go, and backdoor screen) which can be selected using the number keys.

== Development ==
Electronic Arts adapted state-of-the-art commercial flight simulation technology to create the 3D digital basketball court. Full-sized animated player avatars were digitized directly from live action video footage of Jordan and college basketball players using chroma key technology.

== Reception ==
Computer Gaming World praised the "incredible ... 3D-based graphic engine" as being "so far ahead of everyone else", but criticized Michael Jordan in Flight as being too easy because "the product is based on Michael Jordan. Jordan is too good overall". The magazine concluded that it "is the most visually realistic sports software on the market ... Now, they need to apply the technology to a game".

PC Zone was generally positive about Michael Jordan in Flight, summing up their thoughts with "looks good, plays okay." The game's graphics were generally praised, although the animations were criticized: "there just aren't enough frames, and the relative speeds aren't right." The gameplay was viewed mostly positively, but the player selection system was specifically panned and the game's lack of modes and features admonished.
