= Disney Sports Basketball =

2002 video game

- North American GameCube cover art
- Developers: Konami Computer Entertainment Osaka; Polygon Magic
- Publisher: Konami
- Director: Kazunori Yanai
- Producer: Masakatsu Yamaguchi
- Designers: Kazuko Otani; Takeshi Matsuda
- Programmers: Nobuhiro Honma; Tetsuro Noda; Daisuke Fukui; Ken'ichi Hoshino
- Composers: Nobuyuki Akena; Yasumasa Kitagawa
- Platforms: Game Boy Advance; GameCube
- Release: NA: November 25, 2002 (GBA); JP: December 19, 2002; NA: January 14, 2003 (GC); AU: April 4, 2003; UK: June 6, 2003
- Genre: Sports (basketball)
- Modes: Single-player, multiplayer

Disney Sports Basketball (Note: Japanese: ディズニースポーツ：バスケットボール, Hepburn: Dizunī Supōtsu: Basukettobōru) is a 2002 sports video game published by Konami. It was released for the GameCube, and the Game Boy Advance.

== Gameplay ==
DS Basketball lets players control on any team. In the GameCube version, it has 3 members on each team, but for the Game Boy Advance, it only has 2 members for each team. During gameplay, players must use the corresponding accessory to boost up. This allows the team to shoot, dunk, block, and more.

== Teams ==
- The Superstars (Mickey Mouse)
- The Charmers (Minnie Mouse)
- The Seaducks (Donald Duck)
- The Belles (Daisy Duck)
- The Spacenuts (Goofy)
- The TinyRockets (Huey, Dewey, and Louie & José Carioca)
- The Shifters (Max Goof)
- The Steamrollers (Pete)
- The Imperials (Mortimer Mouse)
- Mickey's All-Stars (Mickey, Minnie and Huey)
- Donald's All-Stars (Donald, Daisy and Dewey)
- Goofy's All-Stars (Goofy, Max and Louie)
- Pete's All-Stars (Pete, Mortimer and Big Bad Wolf)

== Reception ==
Reception

Aggregate score
Aggregator	Score	
Aggregator	GBA	GameCube
Metacritic	73/100	37/100

Review scores
Publication	Score	
Publication	GBA	GameCube
4Players	N/A	55%
Consoles +	N/A	83%
Famitsu	25/40	26/40
GamesMaster	45%	54%
GameSpot	7.5/10	2.6/10
GameSpy	N/A	2/5
IGN	8/10	4/10
NGC Magazine	N/A	55%
Nintendo Power	3.2/5	2/5
X-Play	3/5	N/A

The Game Boy Advance version received "mixed or average" reviews, while the GameCube version received "generally unfavorable" reviews, according to the review aggregation website Metacritic. In Japan, Famitsu gave it a score of 26 out of 40 for the GameCube version, and 25 out of 40 for the GBA version.

The GameCube release later became an expensive collectible.
