= Ultimate Basketball =

1990 video game

- North American cover art
- Developer: Aicom
- Publisher: American Sammy
- Composer: Dota Ando
- Platform: Nintendo Entertainment System
- Release: NA: September 1990; JP: April 26, 1991
- Genre: Sports
- Modes: Single-player, multiplayer

Ultimate Basketball is an NES basketball video game. It was released in September 1990 by American Sammy. The game was later licensed by Taito and released in Japan as Taito Basketball (タイトーバスケットボール). This video game is completely unrelated to the Amiga video game of the same title and was represented on the American television series Video Power.

== Gameplay ==
This is the screen that players get after winning the championship.

The game plays like a conventional sports video game. The player chooses from a list of 7 teams, and controls five players on the team on the court, though only one player may be directly controlled at a time. There is a championship mode and a single game mode in the game.

Unlike later sports based video games, Ultimate Basketball doesn't use real professional or college basketball players. The players a player may select for a team are entirely fictional, as are their statistics.

It was possible for so many players to foul out that only three or four were on the floor at the end of the game. In the Japanese version, a generic cheerleader comes over to the player and kisses him for winning the championship.

=== Teams ===
- New York Powers
- Los Angeles Eagles
- Detroit Unions
- Chicago Wolves
- San Diego Dolphins
- Dallas Fighters
- Houston Comets

== Reception ==
Reception

Review scores
Publication	Score
AllGame	3.5/5
Electronic Gaming Monthly	8/10, 8/10, 7/10, 9/10
Famitsu	5/10, 6/10, 7/10, 5/10

AllGame gave this video game a score of 3.5 out of 5 in their overview.
