= Four corners offense =

Style of basketball play

The four corners offense, also known as the four-corner stall or the four corners delay offense, is an offensive strategy for stalling in basketball, primarily used in college basketball and high school basketball before the shot clock was instituted. (Note: As of 2017, the shot clock was only used in high school basketball in eight U.S. states. See also Shot clock#US high schools rules.) Four players stand in the corners of the offensive half-court while the fifth player dribbles the ball in the middle. The point guard usually stays in the middle, but the middle player may periodically switch, temporarily, with one of the corner players.

== Usage ==
A four corners offense was most frequently used prior to the introduction of the shot clock in order to retain a lead by holding on to the ball until the clock ran out. The trailing team would be forced to spread their defense in hopes of getting a steal, which often allowed easy drives to the basket by the offense. The offense typically would seek to score, but only on extremely safe shots. The players in the corners might try to make backdoor cuts, or the point guard could drive the lane. Sometimes, one team would run the four corners offense throughout a game to reduce the number of possessions, in hopes of being able to defeat a superior opponent.

Even if the offense wanted to hold the ball until the end of the game, some strategy was necessary since the rules did not (and still do not) let a player hold the ball for more than five seconds while being closely guarded. So, some mechanism to facilitate safe passes was needed, which this offense provided. There were (and still are) other slowdown strategies, but the four corners was the most well known.

== History ==
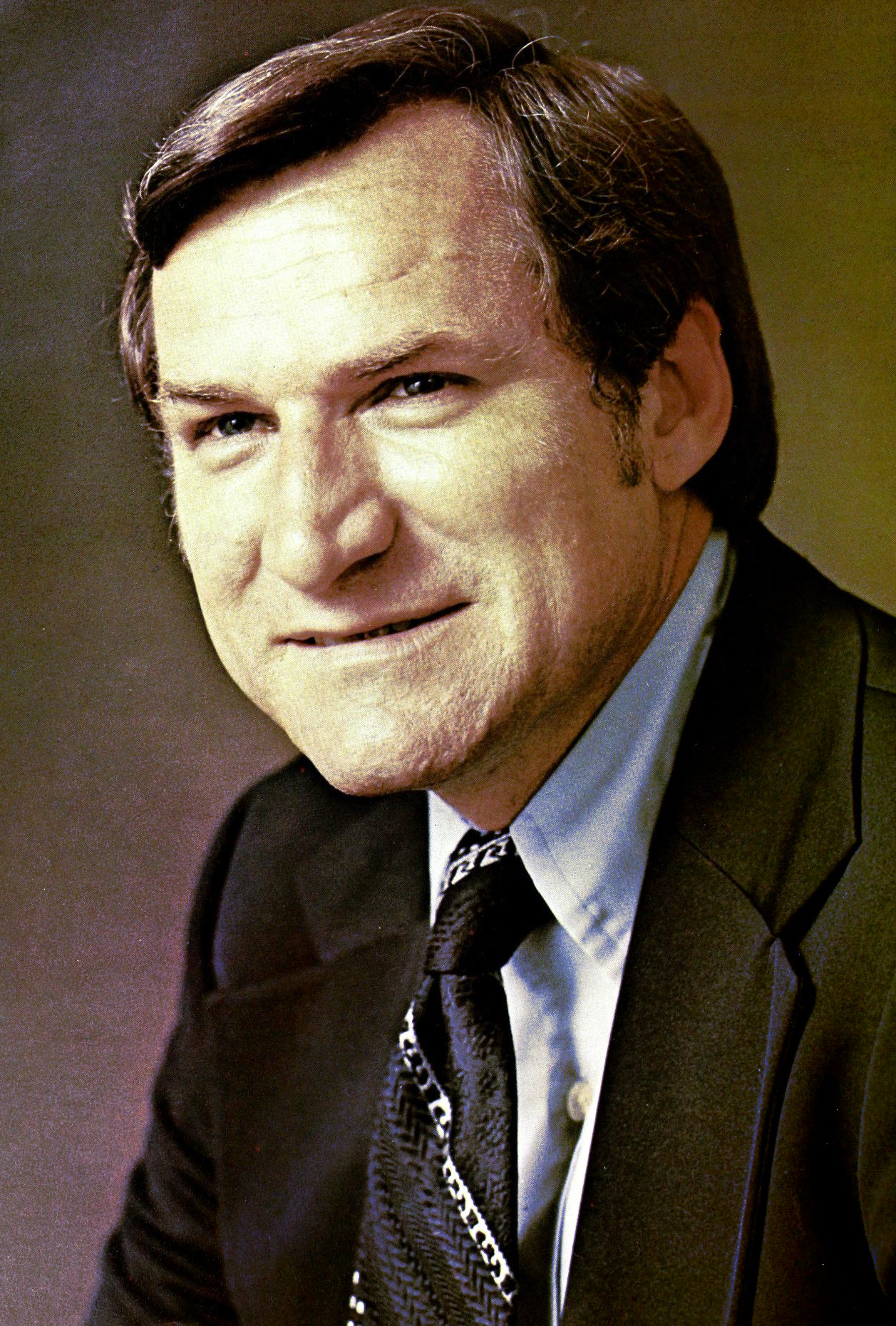
Dean Smith, head coach at North Carolina, popularized the four corners offense in the early 1960s.

The offense was created by the early 1950s by John McLendon, head coach of the North Carolina Central Eagles, and popularized by longtime North Carolina Tar Heels head coach Dean Smith in the early 1960s. He used it to great effect under point guard Phil Ford; it was during his career that some writers referred to the offense as the "Ford Corners."

Basketball's "5 seconds closely guarded" rule was originally introduced partly to prevent stalling, and other rule changes were made to the college rules through the 1970s in hopes of eliminating stalling without using a shot clock as the National Basketball Association (NBA) had since its 1954–55 season. There was a perception that the NBA shot clock did not allow time to work the ball to get a good shot, and that it would reduce the opportunity for varied styles of play.

However, by the early 1980s, fans were fed up. In the nationally televised 1982 Atlantic Coast Conference (ACC) championship game between the North Carolina Tar Heels and the Virginia Cavaliers, North Carolina held the ball for roughly the last seven minutes of the second half to nurse a small lead, eventually winning, 47–45. The next year, the ACC and other conferences introduced a shot clock experimentally, along with a three-point field goal to force defenses to spread out. In 1985, the National Collegiate Athletic Association (NCAA) adopted a shot clock nationally and added the three-pointer a year later.

=== Tributes ===
This style of offense was so distinctive that a local restaurant-bar in Chapel Hill, North Carolina, was named Four Corners in homage to Dean Smith, a local hero.

On February 21, 2015, the Tar Heels, coached by Smith protege Roy Williams, successfully ran the offense on the opening possession against Georgia Tech as a tribute to the recently deceased Smith.
