= Water basketball =

Water sport

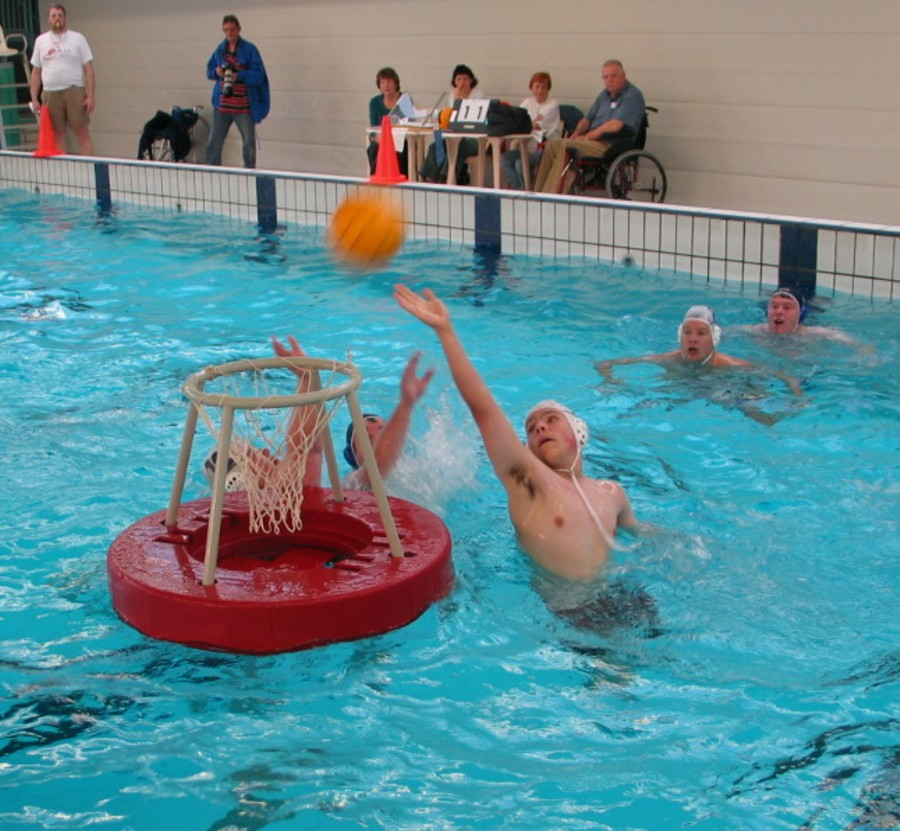
Match of water basketball

Water basketball is a water sport, which mixes the rules of basketball and water polo, played in a swimming pool. Teams of five players each must shoot at the goal with a ball within a certain time after gaining possession.

== History ==
In the Netherlands, people have been playing water basketball (known there as waterbasketbal) since the 1970s. In the Netherlands it was played by people with a handicap. Besides regular tournaments, they also organize a national championship where the best teams compete for the official Dutch Waterbasketbal championship title.

In Slovenia a version of water basketball was developed in 1997. Until that time there were two versions of water basketball. In first one there was a classical basket fixed at edge of the swimming pool. This was not very convenient because players were kicked on the wall of swimming pool and basket was to high for realization of some attractive actions. The second version was using a floating basket, making it very difficult to throw the ball in the basket. Tomaž Slavec and Matjaž Kodek from Kranj, Slovenia developed a special basket (long pillar sunk in the water, with basket on the end at one meter over water level), the ball, and a new playing rules. All disadvantages of the previously described version of water basketball were removed. There is no wall and floating basket problem, and the game became very dynamic (as with hockey) because it could be played behind the basket. This game is also played in Hungary, in the PVKK team in Pécs since 2003 and in Budapest in Budapesti Medúzák team since 2007.

In Tasmania, water basketball first started in September 2003 with a demonstration game between two teams made up of Hobart Chargers, Hobart Hurricanes, Tassie Devils football team and the Tassie Tigers cricket team. The sport has been further developed by The Hobart Aquatic Centre to allow for a more recreational and mixed approach to the game. It involves two teams of six players (of which at least three are female) on field (with a maximum of four additional substitutes), who pass the ball down the pool to their goal end, which is a hoop similar to basketball.

In 2005, the Italian Federation of Basketball recognized it as a form of basketball. Italian-American player Donte DiVincenzo was instrumental in the growing popularity of the sport. Michael Phelps also helped create awareness and donated to charities promoting water basketball.
