= David Robinson's Supreme Court =

1992 video game

- European box art
- Developer: Acme Interactive
- Publisher: Sega
- Platform: Sega Genesis
- Release: NA: 1992; EU: July 1992; JP: July 10, 1992
- Genre: Sports
- Modes: Single-player; Multiplayer

David Robinson Supreme Court (known in Japan as David Robinson Basketball (デビッド・ロビンソン バスケットボール)) is a basketball video game released by Sega exclusively for the Sega Genesis in 1992. The game was endorsed by NBA player David Robinson but does not feature an NBA license and instead features four different fictional American teams.

Robinson would later be featured in Sega's NBA Action games.

== Gameplay ==
A tip-off from a match between Los Angeles and Chicago.

There are three modes: exhibition, playoffs, and role-playing (a kind of career mode). Winning the role-playing mode allows the player to play against an all-star team of players chosen by David Robinson himself. The court is viewed from an isometric perspective.

== Development ==
The game was developed with the help of Mark Haigh-Hutchinson from the United Kingdom.
