= Golden Basket =

1990 video game

- Developer: Opera Soft
- Publisher: Opera Soft
- Platforms: Amstrad CPC, MS-DOS, MSX, ZX Spectrum
- Release: 1990
- Genre: Sports
- Mode: Single-player

Golden Basket is a 1990 basketball video game developed and published by Opera Soft under their Opera Sports label for the ZX Spectrum, Amstrad CPC, MSX, and MS-DOS.

== Gameplay ==
The game features a five-a-side basketball match, showing a lateral view.
