= Ball hog =

Derisive term for a basketball player

A ball hog is a derisive term for a basketball player who handles the ball exclusively to the point of impairing the team. Despite not being a violation of the rules of basketball, "ball-hogging" is generally considered unacceptable playing behavior at all levels of basketball competition. The term is highly subjective, and any individual player might be considered a ball hog by some observers but not by others.

Ball-hogging usually involves excessive shooting of difficult shots, especially when other players are in advantageous positions. Ball hogs attempt to monopolize their play of the ball, frequently dribbling excessively and infrequently passing the ball to a teammate. Ball-hogging tends to manifest itself statistically as an abnormally high percentage of team shot attempts by the ball hog and often low percentages of shot accuracy and assists. They also tend to have a very poor assist-to-turnover ratio, used as the main statistical indicator of how well a player "shares" the ball.

Ball-hogging can be detrimental to a team both immediately and in the long term. For instance, a player with ball-hogging tendencies may overlook or neglect a teammate who is open for a relatively easy shot, choosing instead to take a more difficult shot himself, often at the team's expense. Additionally, repeated ball-hogging by a player can damage a team's cohesiveness and alienate the player from his teammates, coaches, and fans. Another example of a ball hog is a player whose aim is to boost his statistics. This could be done even through assists. A player who tries to do the most of everything – holding the ball and executing all the plays, from scoring to assisting, when it is detrimental to the outcome of the game – can also be known as a ball hog.

In professional leagues, when an exceptionally competent player takes control of the ball a large amount of the time, but it is in the team's best interest due to the player's very high shot percentage and low turnover rate, and low availability of similarly skilled players on the team, he is not usually considered a ball hog. The expectation of a professional team is to play in the manner which will produce the most team wins, which will naturally lead to an imbalance among teammates of differing skill levels. However, in amateur and children's basketball, monopolizing the ball is often considered unsportsmanlike regardless of the effect it has on the team's wins.

A gym class variation of a ball hog is a student who wants to handle the ball when it is unnecessary, i.e. a student who intercepts a between-play pass such as returning a ball to a pitcher or volleyball server for a new pitch or serve. The ball hog will intercept the pass from another player so he or she can hand the ball to the pitcher or server.

Can also be used in other teamsports, such as Football, Soccer and Rugby.
