= Tip Off =

1991 video game

- Developer: Anco Software
- Publisher: Imagineer
- Platforms: Amiga, Atari, Game Boy
- Release: 1991
- Genre: Sports game

Tip Off is a basketball game released for the Amiga and Atari. It was developed in 1991 by Anco Software.

A Game Boy version was developed by Enigma Variations and published by Imagineer in Europe. An unreleased NES version was also in development.

An early build of the game on NES was found and released in April 21, 2025 by Games That Weren't website.
