= List of Boston Celtics seasons =

This is a list of seasons completed by the Boston Celtics of the National Basketball Association. It documents the team's season-by-season records, including postseason results, and year-end awards won by the team's players and coaches.

== Seasons ==
Note: Statistics are correct as of the 2025–26 season.

NBA champions	Conference champions	Division champions	Playoff berth

Season	Conference	Finish	Division	Finish	Wins	Losses	Win%	GB	Playoffs	Awards	Head coach	Ref.
1946–47	—	—	Eastern	5th	22	38	.367	27	—	—	John Russell	
1947–48	—	—	Eastern	3rd	20	28	.417	7	Lost first round (Stags) 2–1	—	John Russell	
1948–49	—	—	Eastern	5th	25	35	.417	13	—	—	Alvin Julian	
1949–50	—	—	Eastern	6th	22	46	.324	31	—	—	Alvin Julian	
1950–51	—	—	Eastern	2nd	39	30	.565	2.5	Lost division semifinals (Knicks) 2–0	Ed Macauley (ASG MVP)	Red Auerbach	
1951–52	—	—	Eastern	2nd	39	27	.591	1	Lost division semifinals (Knicks) 2–1	—	Red Auerbach	
1952–53	—	—	Eastern	3rd	46	25	.648	1.5	Won division semifinals (Nationals) 2–0; Lost division finals (Knicks) 3–1	—	Red Auerbach	
1953–54	—	—	Eastern	T-2nd	42	30	.583	2	Advanced round-robin divisional semifinals 2–2; Lost division finals (Nationals) 2–0	Bob Cousy (ASG MVP)	Red Auerbach	
1954–55	—	—	Eastern	3rd	36	36	.500	7	Won division semifinals (Knicks) 2–1; Lost division finals (Nationals) 3–1	Bill Sharman (ASG MVP)	Red Auerbach	
1955–56	—	—	Eastern	2nd	39	33	.542	6	Lost division semifinals (Nationals) 2–1	—	Red Auerbach	
1956–57	—	—	Eastern	1st	44	28	.611	—	Won division finals (Nationals) 3–0; Won NBA Finals (Hawks) 4–3	Bob Cousy (MVP, ASG MVP); Tom Heinsohn (ROY)	Red Auerbach	
1957–58	—	—	Eastern	1st	49	23	.681	—	Won division finals (Warriors) 4–1; Lost NBA Finals (Hawks) 4–2	Bill Russell (MVP)	Red Auerbach	
1958–59	—	—	Eastern	1st	52	20	.722	—	Won division finals (Nationals) 4–3; Won NBA Finals (Lakers) 4–0	—	Red Auerbach	
1959–60	—	—	Eastern	1st	59	16	.787	—	Won division finals (Warriors) 4–2; Won NBA Finals (Hawks) 4–3	—	Red Auerbach	
1960–61	—	—	Eastern	1st	57	22	.722	—	Won division finals (Nationals) 4–1; Won NBA Finals (Hawks) 4–1	Bill Russell (MVP)	Red Auerbach	
1961–62	—	—	Eastern	1st	60	20	.750	—	Won division finals (Warriors) 4–3; Won NBA Finals (Lakers) 4–3	Bill Russell (MVP)	Red Auerbach	
1962–63	—	—	Eastern	1st	58	22	.725	—	Won division finals (Royals) 4–3; Won NBA Finals (Lakers) 4–2	Bill Russell (MVP, ASG MVP)	Red Auerbach	
1963–64	—	—	Eastern	1st	59	21	.738	—	Won division finals (Royals) 4–1; Won NBA Finals (Warriors) 4–1	—	Red Auerbach	
1964–65	—	—	Eastern	1st	62	18	.775	—	Won division finals (76ers) 4–3; Won NBA Finals (Lakers) 4–1	Bill Russell (MVP); Red Auerbach (COY)	Red Auerbach	
1965–66	—	—	Eastern	2nd	54	26	.675	1	Won division semifinals (Royals) 3–2; Won division finals (76ers) 4–1; Won NBA Finals (Lakers) 4–3	—	Red Auerbach	
1966–67	—	—	Eastern	2nd	60	21	.741	8	Won division semifinals (Knicks) 3–1; Lost division finals (76ers) 4–1	—	Bill Russell	
1967–68	—	—	Eastern	2nd	54	28	.659	8	Won division semifinals (Pistons) 4–2; Won division finals (76ers) 4–3; Won NBA Finals (Lakers) 4–2	—	Bill Russell	
1968–69	—	—	Eastern	4th	48	34	.585	9	Won division semifinals (76ers) 4–1; Won division finals (Knicks) 4–2; Won NBA Finals (Lakers) 4–3	—	Bill Russell	
1969–70	—	—	Eastern	6th	34	48	.415	26	—	—	Tom Heinsohn	
1970–71	Eastern	5th	Atlantic	3rd	44	38	.537	8	—	Dave Cowens (ROY)	Tom Heinsohn	
1971–72	Eastern	1st	Atlantic	1st	56	26	.683	—	Won conference semifinals (Hawks) 4–2; Lost conference finals (Knicks) 4–1	—	Tom Heinsohn	
1972–73	Eastern	1st	Atlantic	1st	68	14	.829	—	Won conference semifinals (Hawks) 4–2; Lost conference finals (Knicks) 4–3	Dave Cowens (MVP, ASG MVP); Tom Heinsohn (COY)	Tom Heinsohn	
1973–74	Eastern	1st	Atlantic	1st	56	26	.683	—	Won conference semifinals (Braves) 4–2; Won conference finals (Knicks) 4–1; Won NBA Finals (Bucks) 4–3	John Havlicek (FMVP)	Tom Heinsohn	
1974–75	Eastern	1st	Atlantic	1st	60	22	.732	—	Won conference semifinals (Rockets) 4–1; Lost conference finals (Bullets) 4–2	—	Tom Heinsohn	
1975–76	Eastern	1st	Atlantic	1st	54	28	.659	—	Won conference semifinals (Braves) 4–2; Won conference finals (Cavaliers) 4–2; Won NBA Finals (Suns) 4–2	Jo Jo White (FMVP)	Tom Heinsohn	
1976–77	Eastern	4th	Atlantic	2nd	44	38	.537	6	Won first round (Spurs) 2–0; Lost conference semifinals (76ers) 4–3	—	Tom Heinsohn	
1977–78	Eastern	8th	Atlantic	3rd	32	50	.390	23	—	—	Tom Heinsohn; Tom Sanders	
1978–79	Eastern	10th	Atlantic	5th	29	53	.354	25	—	—	Tom Sanders; Dave Cowens	
1979–80	Eastern	1st	Atlantic	1st	61	21	.744	—	Won conference semifinals (Rockets) 4–0; Lost conference finals (76ers) 4–1	Larry Bird (ROY); Bill Fitch (COY); Red Auerbach (EOY)	Bill Fitch	
1980–81	Eastern	1st	Atlantic	1st	62	20	.756	—	Won conference semifinals (Bulls) 4–0; Won conference finals (76ers) 4–3; Won NBA Finals (Rockets) 4–2	Cedric Maxwell (FMVP); Nate Archibald (ASG MVP)	Bill Fitch	
1981–82	Eastern	1st	Atlantic	1st	63	19	.768	—	Won conference semifinals (Bullets) 4–1; Lost conference finals (76ers) 4–3	Larry Bird (ASG MVP)	Bill Fitch	
1982–83	Eastern	3rd	Atlantic	2nd	56	26	.683	9	Won first round (Hawks) 2–1; Lost conference semifinals (Bucks) 4–0	—	Bill Fitch	
1983–84	Eastern	1st	Atlantic	1st	62	20	.756	—	Won first round (Bullets) 3–1; Won conference semifinals (Knicks) 4–3; Won conference finals (Bucks) 4–1; Won NBA Finals (Lakers) 4–3	Larry Bird (MVP, FMVP); Kevin McHale (SIX)	K. C. Jones	
1984–85	Eastern	1st	Atlantic	1st	63	19	.768	—	Won first round (Cavaliers) 3–1; Won conference semifinals (Pistons) 4–2; Won conference finals (76ers) 4–1; Lost NBA Finals (Lakers) 4–2	Larry Bird (MVP); Kevin McHale (SIX)	K. C. Jones	
1985–86	Eastern	1st	Atlantic	1st	67	15	.817	—	Won first round (Bulls) 3–0; Won conference semifinals (Hawks) 4–1; Won conference finals (Bucks) 4–0; Won NBA Finals (Rockets) 4–2	Larry Bird (MVP, FMVP); Bill Walton (SIX)	K. C. Jones	
1986–87	Eastern	1st	Atlantic	1st	59	23	.720	—	Won first round (Bulls) 3–0; Won conference semifinals (Bucks) 4–3; Won conference finals (Pistons) 4–3; Lost NBA Finals (Lakers) 4–2	—	K. C. Jones	
1987–88	Eastern	1st	Atlantic	1st	57	25	.695	—	Won first round (Knicks) 3–1; Won conference semifinals (Hawks) 4–3; Lost conference finals (Pistons) 4–2	—	K. C. Jones	
1988–89	Eastern	8th	Atlantic	3rd	42	40	.512	10	Lost first round (Pistons) 3–0	—	Jimmy Rodgers	
1989–90	Eastern	4th	Atlantic	2nd	52	30	.634	1	Lost first round (Knicks) 3–2	—	Jimmy Rodgers	
1990–91	Eastern	2nd	Atlantic	1st	56	26	.683	—	Won first round (Pacers) 3–2; Lost conference semifinals (Pistons) 4–2	—	Chris Ford	
1991–92	Eastern	2nd	Atlantic	1st	51	31	.622	—	Won first round (Pacers) 3–0; Lost conference semifinals (Cavaliers) 4–3	—	Chris Ford	
1992–93	Eastern	4th	Atlantic	2nd	48	34	.585	12	Lost first round (Hornets) 3–1	—	Chris Ford	
1993–94	Eastern	10th	Atlantic	5th	32	50	.390	25	—	—	Chris Ford	
1994–95	Eastern	8th	Atlantic	3rd	35	47	.427	22	Lost first round (Magic) 3–1	—	Chris Ford	
1995–96	Eastern	11th	Atlantic	5th	33	49	.402	27	—	—	M. L. Carr	
1996–97	Eastern	15th	Atlantic	7th	15	67	.183	46	—	—	M. L. Carr	
1997–98	Eastern	12th	Atlantic	6th	36	46	.439	19	—	—	Rick Pitino	
1998–99	Eastern	12th	Atlantic	5th	19	31	.380	14	—	—	Rick Pitino	
1999–00	Eastern	10th	Atlantic	5th	35	47	.427	17	—	—	Rick Pitino	
2000–01	Eastern	9th	Atlantic	5th	36	46	.439	20	—	—	Rick Pitino; Jim O'Brien	
2001–02	Eastern	3rd	Atlantic	2nd	49	33	.598	3	Won first round (76ers) 3–2; Won conference semifinals (Pistons) 4–1; Lost conference finals (Nets) 4–2	—	Jim O'Brien	
2002–03	Eastern	6th	Atlantic	3rd	44	38	.537	5	Won first round (Pacers) 4–2; Lost conference semifinals (Nets) 4–0	—	Jim O'Brien	
2003–04	Eastern	8th	Atlantic	4th	36	46	.439	11	Lost first round (Pacers) 4–0	—	Jim O'Brien; John Carroll	
2004–05	Eastern	3rd	Atlantic	1st	45	37	.549	—	Lost first round (Pacers) 4–3	—	Doc Rivers	
2005–06	Eastern	11th	Atlantic	3rd	33	49	.402	16	—	—	Doc Rivers	
2006–07	Eastern	15th	Atlantic	5th	24	58	.293	23	—	—	Doc Rivers	
2007–08	Eastern	1st	Atlantic	1st	66	16	.805	—	Won first round (Hawks) 4–3; Won conference semifinals (Cavaliers) 4–3; Won conference finals (Pistons) 4–2; Won NBA Finals (Lakers) 4–2	Paul Pierce (FMVP); Kevin Garnett (DPOY); Danny Ainge (EOY)	Doc Rivers	
2008–09	Eastern	2nd	Atlantic	1st	62	20	.756	—	Won first round (Bulls) 4–3; Lost conference semifinals (Magic) 4–3	—	Doc Rivers	
2009–10	Eastern	4th	Atlantic	1st	50	32	.610	—	Won first round (Heat) 4–1; Won conference semifinals (Cavaliers) 4–2; Won conference finals (Magic) 4–2; Lost NBA Finals (Lakers) 4–3	—	Doc Rivers	
2010–11	Eastern	3rd	Atlantic	1st	56	26	.683	—	Won first round (Knicks) 4–0; Lost conference semifinals (Heat) 4–1	—	Doc Rivers	
2011–12	Eastern	4th	Atlantic	1st	39	27	.591	—	Won first round (Hawks) 4–2; Won conference semifinals (76ers) 4–3; Lost conference finals (Heat) 4–3	—	Doc Rivers	
2012–13	Eastern	7th	Atlantic	3rd	41	40	.506	12.5	Lost first round (Knicks) 4–2	—	Doc Rivers	
2013–14	Eastern	12th	Atlantic	4th	25	57	.305	23	—	—	Brad Stevens	
2014–15	Eastern	7th	Atlantic	2nd	40	42	.488	9	Lost first round (Cavaliers) 4–0	—	Brad Stevens	
2015–16	Eastern	5th	Atlantic	2nd	48	34	.585	8	Lost first round (Hawks) 4–2	—	Brad Stevens	
2016–17	Eastern	1st	Atlantic	1st	53	29	.646	—	Won first round (Bulls) 4–2; Won conference semifinals (Wizards) 4–3; Lost conference finals (Cavaliers) 4–1	—	Brad Stevens	
2017–18	Eastern	2nd	Atlantic	2nd	55	27	.671	4	Won first round (Bucks) 4–3; Won conference semifinals (76ers) 4–1; Lost conference finals (Cavaliers) 4–3	—	Brad Stevens	
2018–19	Eastern	4th	Atlantic	3rd	49	33	.598	9	Won first round (Pacers) 4–0; Lost conference semifinals (Bucks) 4–1	—	Brad Stevens	
2019–20	Eastern	3rd	Atlantic	2nd	48	24	.667	7.5	Won first round (76ers) 4–0; Won conference semifinals (Raptors) 4–3; Lost conference finals (Heat) 4–2	—	Brad Stevens	
2020–21	Eastern	7th	Atlantic	4th	36	36	.500	13	Lost first round (Nets) 4–1	—	Brad Stevens	
2021–22	Eastern	2nd	Atlantic	1st	51	31	.622	—	Won first round (Nets) 4–0; Won conference semifinals (Bucks) 4–3; Won conference finals (Heat) 4–3; Lost NBA Finals (Warriors) 4–2	Marcus Smart (DPOY)	Ime Udoka	
2022–23	Eastern	2nd	Atlantic	1st	57	25	.695	—	Won first round (Hawks) 4–2; Won conference semifinals (76ers) 4–3; Lost conference finals (Heat) 4–3	Malcolm Brogdon (SIX); Jayson Tatum (ASG MVP)	Joe Mazzulla	
2023–24	Eastern	1st	Atlantic	1st	64	18	.780	—	Won first round (Heat) 4–1; Won conference semifinals (Cavaliers) 4–1; Won conference finals (Pacers) 4–0; Won NBA Finals (Mavericks) 4–1	Jaylen Brown (FMVP); Brad Stevens (EOY)	Joe Mazzulla	
2024–25	Eastern	2nd	Atlantic	1st	61	21	.744	—	Won first round (Magic) 4–1; Lost conference semifinals (Knicks) 4–2	Payton Pritchard (SIX); Jrue Holiday (SPOR)	Joe Mazzulla	
2025–26	Eastern	2nd	Atlantic	1st	56	26	.683	—	Lost first round (76ers) 4–3	Joe Mazzulla (COY); Brad Stevens (EOY); Derrick White (SPOR)	Joe Mazzulla	

== All-time records ==
Statistic	Wins	Losses	W–L%
Regular season record (1946–present)	3,751	2,527	.597
Postseason record (1946–present)	432	324	.571
All-time regular and postseason record	4,183	2,851	.595
