= Turnover (basketball) =

When a basketball team loses possession of the ball to the opposing team

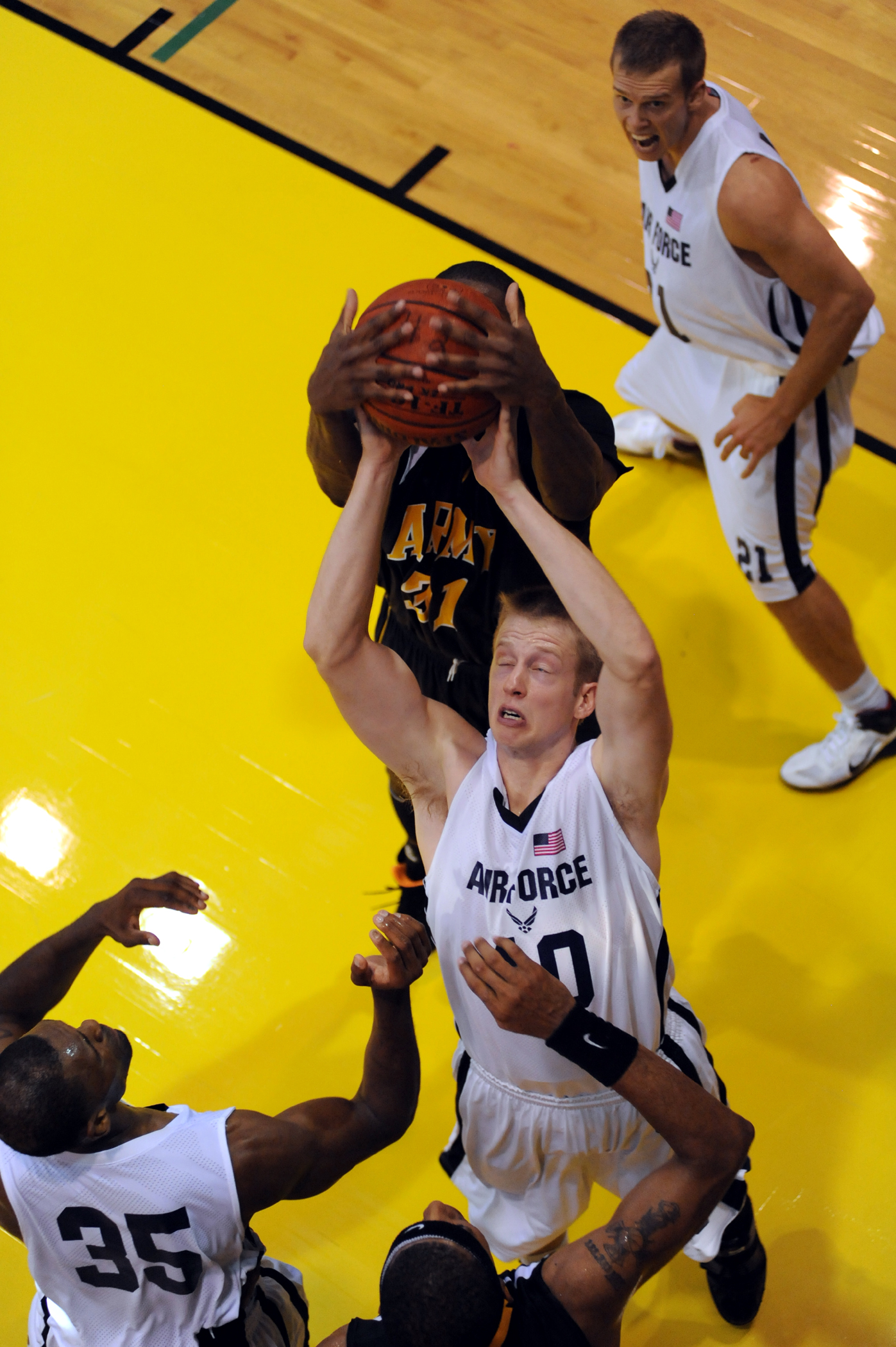
A basketball player taking the ball from a player on the opposing team.

In basketball, a turnover occurs when a team loses possession of the ball to the opposing team before a player takes a shot at their team's basket. This can result from a player getting the ball stolen, stepping out of bounds, having a pass intercepted, committing a violation (such as double dribble, traveling, shot clock violation, three-second violation or five-second violation), or committing an offensive foul (including personal, flagrant, and technical fouls).

Turnovers can be classified into two categories: dead-ball turnovers and live-ball turnovers. Dead-ball turnovers are those which result in dead balls (e.g. rules violations) and live-ball turnovers are those which do not require play to be stopped (e.g. an intercepted pass or recovered loose ball).

According to Boston Globe sportswriter Bob Ryan, the concept of the turnover was first formulated by his colleague Jack Barry. Turnovers were first officially recorded in the American Basketball Association (ABA) during the 1967–68 season. The NBA began tracking team turnovers during the 1973-74 season and started tracking turnovers for individual players during the 1977–78 season subsequent to the NBA-ABA merger. The WNBA has recorded turnovers since its inaugural season in 1997.

== Records ==
=== NBA ===
The record for the most turnovers in an NBA game is shared by Jason Kidd and John Drew. Kidd committed 14 turnovers against the New York Knicks on November 17, 2000, while playing for the Phoenix Suns. Drew committed 14 turnovers against the New Jersey Nets on March 1, 1978, while playing for the Atlanta Hawks. The record for most turnovers in an NBA playoff game was 13, set by James Harden on May 27, 2015, while playing for the Houston Rockets against the Golden State Warriors.

LeBron James holds the regular season and playoff records for most career turnovers with 5,621 in the regular season and 1,047 in the playoffs. Russell Westbrook holds the record for highest career turnover average in the regular season with 3.91 turnovers per game.

=== WNBA ===
The record for the most turnovers by a WNBA team in one game is 33. The record for the most turnovers by a WNBA player per season is held by Ticha Penicheiro, who committed 135 turnovers in 1999. The career record for the most turnovers by a WNBA player is held by Diana Taurasi with 1,520.

== See also ==
- List of National Basketball Association career turnovers leaders
- NBA records
