= Violation (basketball) =

Illegal action in basketball

In basketball, a common violation is the most minor class of illegal action. Most violations are committed by the team with possession of the ball, when a player mishandles the ball or makes an illegal move. The typical penalty for a violation is loss of the ball to the other team. This is one type of turnover.

Common violations are defined in Rule No. 10 of the NBA Rulebook.

== Ball-handling violations ==
- Backcourt violation (Over and back)
- Carrying or palming
- Double-dribble
- Traveling

== Excessive time taken ==
- Defensive three-second violation (Illegal defense) (penalized as a technical foul)
- Five-second rule
- Shot clock violation
- Time line violation, exceeding the time limit to reach the frontcourt (8- or 10-second violation)
- Three seconds rule (Lane violation)

== Other violations ==
- Basket interference
- Goaltending

Stepping or losing the ball out of bounds may also be considered violations, as they result in the loss of the ball.

Acts involving contact between opponents or unsportsmanlike conduct are called fouls, usually a personal foul.
