= Official (basketball) =

Official who enforces the rules and maintains order in a basketball game

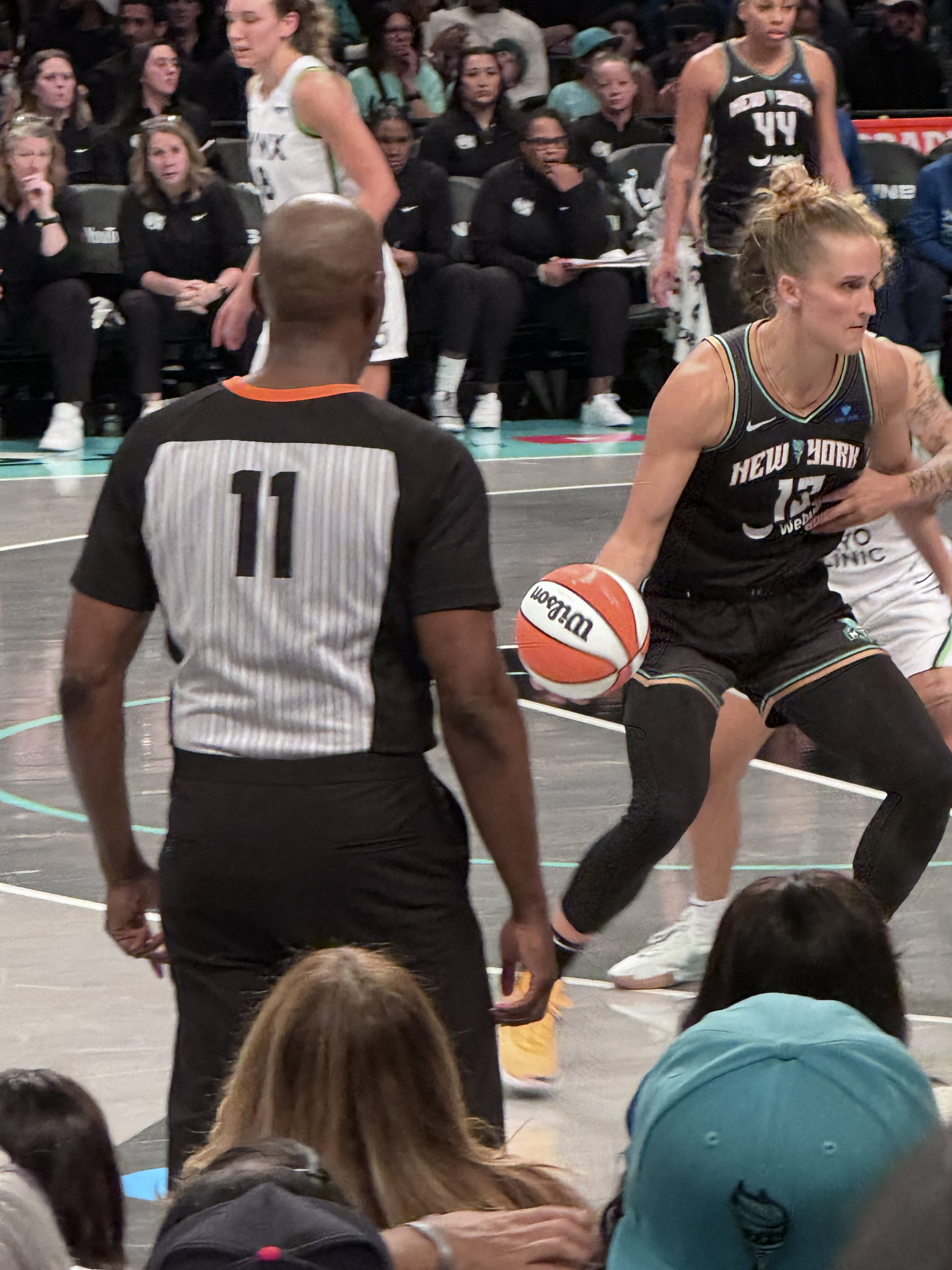
A basketball referee watches players closely during the WNBA Finals.

In basketball, an official (usually called a referee) enforces the rules and maintains order in the game. The title of official also applies to the scorers and timekeepers, and other personnel that have an active task in maintaining the game. Basketball is regarded as among the most difficult sports to officiate due to the speed of play, complexity of rules, the case-specific interpretations of rules, and the instantaneous decision required.

There is one head referee and one or two umpires, depending on whether there is a two- or three-person crew. In the NBA, the head official is called the crew chief with one referee and one umpire. In FIBA-sanctioned play, two-person crews consist of a crew chief and an umpire, and three-person crews contain a crew chief and two umpires.

Regardless, both classes of officials have equal rights to control almost all aspects of the game. In most cases, the head official (in FIBA, the crew chief) performs the jump ball to begin the contest, though NFHS, NCAA, and the NBA, have allowed the referee to designate which official (referee or umpire; in the NBA: crew chief, referee, or umpire) shall perform the jump ball.

== Uniforms ==
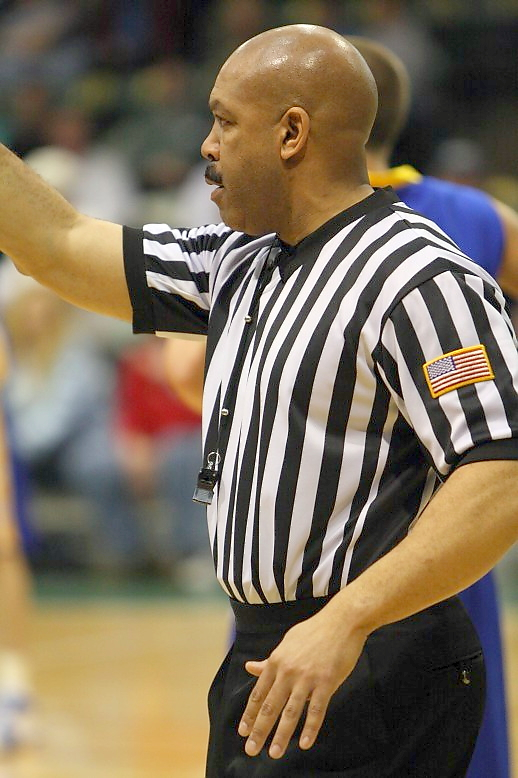
NCAA official Moe Kincaid making a call in a 2008 college basketball game

In American high school basketball, officials wear black-and-white-striped shirts with black side panels, black pants, and black shoes. Some state high school associations allow officials to wear grey shirts with black pin-stripes instead of black-and-white-striped shirts.

College basketball officials previously wore black-and-white striped shirts, but in the 2019–20 season men's and women's officials introduced new bespoke uniforms. Men's officials now wear shirts with black-and-white stripes on the torso and back and black raglan sleeves, while women's officials wear shirts that are predominantly grey with white pin-stripes, with black sleeves and light blue trim on the collar and between the torso and sleeves (the shade of blue used being the color of the National Collegiate Athletic Association logo). The new men's uniform in particular has grown in popularity on the grassroots level with several state high school associations migrating to the style since its introduction.

NBA officials wear light grey shirts with black slacks and black shoes. The NBA shirt is light grey with thin white stripes, black sleeves, a black stripe on either side, a red and blue collar, the official's number in the center at the top on the back, and the NBA logo above the left breast and the Nike Swoosh on the right. NBA Summer League officials wear the same light grey shirt but with a black collar. The WNBA referee shirt is almost identical to the NBA referee shirt except that its collar is orange and the WNBA logo takes the place of the NBA logo. NBA and WNBA officials also wear the logo of the airline Emirates on their chests as part of a sponsorship deal which began in 2024.

FIBA officials wear a grey (torso) and black (sleeves) shirt, black trousers, black socks, and black shoes. Officials in competitions organized by Euroleague Basketball – the EuroLeague and EuroCup – wear an orange shirt. Officials in the Israel Basketball Association wear the EuroLeague's orange shirt but sometimes wear royal blue shirts for contests between two Israeli teams. Australian NBL officials wear green shirts with black shoulders and stripes on the sides with black pants. The NBL logo is atop the breast and a sponsor's name is on the back. Shirts are V-neck, without a collar, and pants lack belts.

All officials wear a whistle that is used to stop play as a result of a foul or a violation on the court. Hand signals are used to indicate the nature of the infraction or to administer the game.

In higher levels of college and professional basketball, officials wear a timing device on the belt-line called PTS (Precision Timing System). The device is used by on-court officials to start and stop the game clock in a timely manner, rather than waiting for the scoreboard operator (timekeeper) to do so, while also limiting timing discrepancies or errors. Referees start the clock by pressing a button on the belt-pack and the system is tuned to send a signal that stops the game clock when the referee blows their whistle.

== Positions and responsibilities ==
A diagram of the relative positions of basketball officials in "three-person" mechanics. The lead official (L) is normally along the baseline of the court. The trail official (T) takes up a position approximately level with the top of the three-point line. The center official (C) stands across the court near the free-throw line.

The officials must ensure that the game runs smoothly, and this encompasses a variety of different responsibilities, from calling the game to player and spectator management. They also carry a duty of care to the players they officiate and to ensure that the court and all equipment used is in a safe and usable condition. Should there be an issue that inhibits the safe playing of the game, then it is the job of the officials to rectify the problem. Quite often, the job of an official surpasses that of the game at hand, as they must overcome unforeseen situations that may or may not have an influence on the game.

There are two standard methods for officiating a basketball game, either "two-person" or "three-person" mechanics depending on how many officials are available to work the game.

In "two-person" mechanics, each official works either the lead or the trail position. The lead position is normally along the baseline of the court, with the trail position having its starting point at the free-throw line extended on the left side of the court facing the basket. Officials change position often during the game to cover the area in the best possible way. As the game transitions from one end of the court to the other, the lead becomes the trail and vice versa. Between the two positions, each is responsible for a specific part of the court as well as two each of the side, base or back court lines. Officials change position after certain calls (mostly when the lead official calls a defensive foul). This allows officials to alternate between positions to increase the speed of play; one official will approach the bench whilst another, usually the closest to the bench at that time, will move to occupy his position. This also prevents one official from always working one particular team's basket throughout the course of the game.

In "three-person" mechanics, the court is further divided among three officials, with the lead (baseline) official determining the position of the other two officials. Normally, the lead official will move to the side of the court in which the ball is located (strong side), particularly if there is a "post-up" player in that position. The official that is on the same sideline as the lead official then takes up a position approximately level with the top of the three-point line and becomes the "trail" official, while the third official will stand across the court near the free-throw line in what is called the center position. This creates a triangle coverage of the court. Often, the lead will switch sides of the baseline during a play, requiring the trail to move down to be level with the free-throw line and become the new center, while the center will move up and become the trail. As the ball moves to the other end of the court in transition, the lead will become the trail, the trail will become the lead, and the center official will remain in the center (unless the new "lead" moves across the baseline to cover the strong side, in which case the center official and trail would then switch positions.)

== Difficulty ==
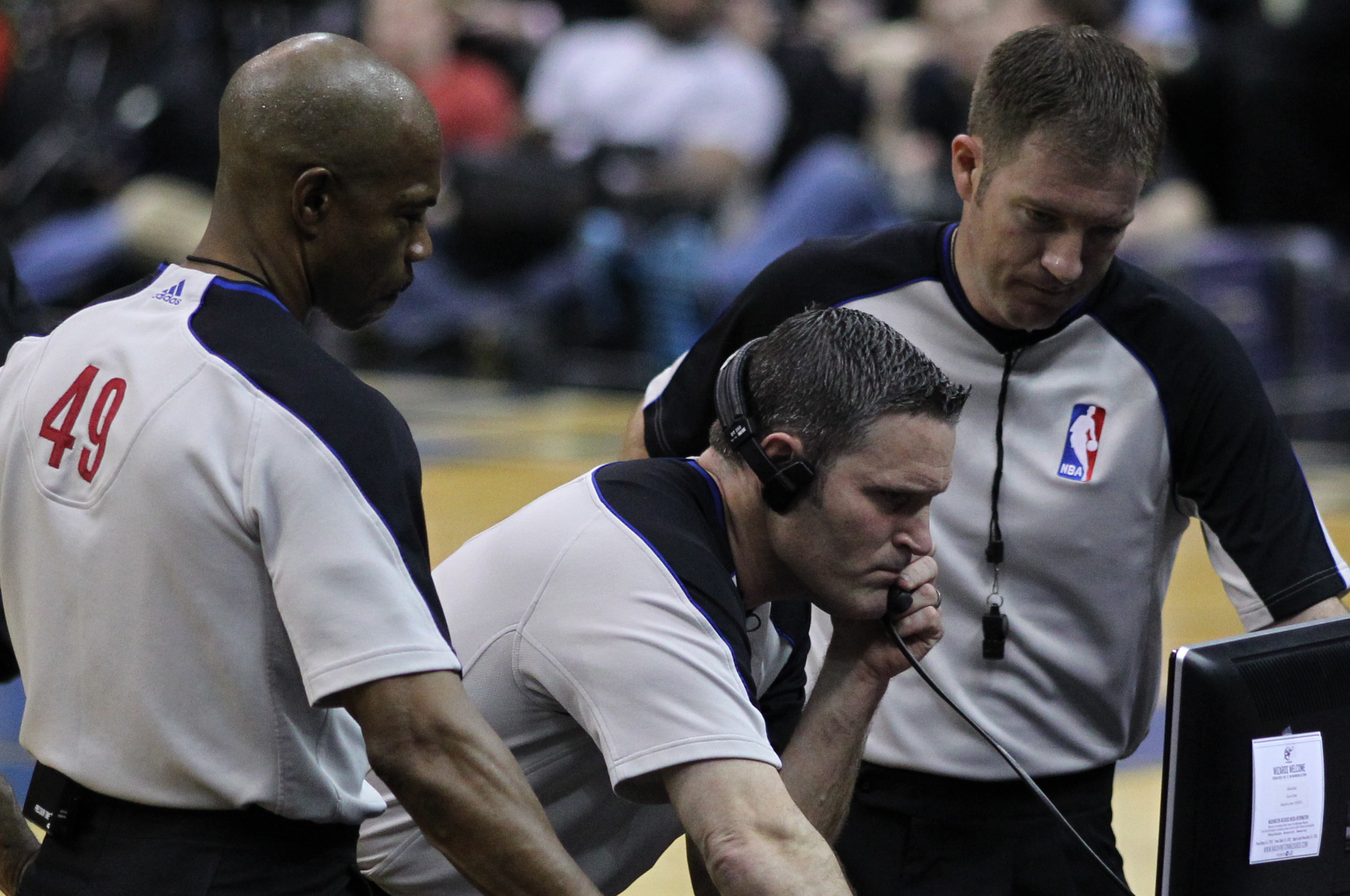
NBA officials Monty McCutchen (center), Tom Washington (#49) and Brent Barnaky reviewing a play.

Basketball is regarded by many fans as among the most difficult sports to officiate. Usually basketball officials have only split seconds to determine if an infraction has occurred, due to the speed of play of the game and the officials' proximity to the action. Especially difficult are the "charge/block" call and shooting foul/block attempt. Officials often rely on instant replay to review plays. Only recently has a coach been allowed to contest a call by the official, or one missed by them, but this is only valid for a specific window.

Despite the misconception that basketball is a non-contact sport, officials often let a large amount of marginal or incidental contact pass uncalled. An official must always be aware of not just what is happening around the ball, but the roughness of play going on around the whole court, adding to the job of the official.

Further complicating the job of an official is the proximity to the crowds. Unlike football or baseball, the crowd is nearly always located within a few feet of the official, as are coaches and other players on the bench. To combat this, officials are able to remove a fan from the arena with an ejection.

== Duties ==
The duties of the basketball referee are exactly this: to ensure the game is played safely and fairly. The referee enforces the rules of the game and in a game will make hundreds of decisions—determining when a violation or foul occurs and then stopping the game to issue the correct penalty.

=== Violations ===
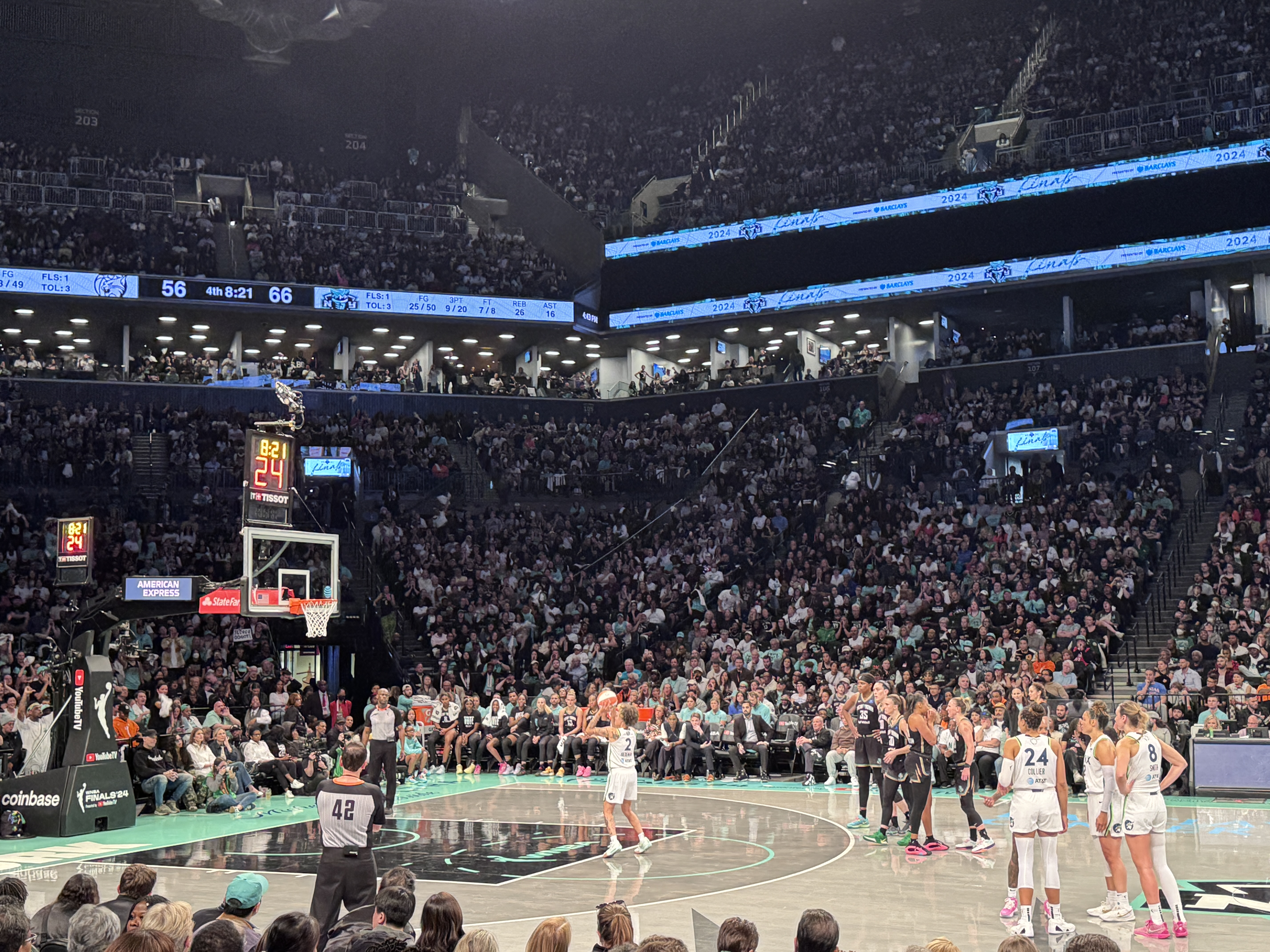
Officials and players from both teams look on as a fouled player attempts a free throw.

When a violation occurs, game action is immediately stopped. These include traveling, illegal dribbles, out-of-bounds, and other violations. The official is required to blow the whistle and immediately stop play and award the ball over to the opposing team, thereby allowing for fair play in the game. Along with those, during a game, contact fouls can occur that, if called, will result in the opponent getting two shots from the free-throw line.
