= Personal foul (basketball) =

Illegal contact with an opponent in basketball

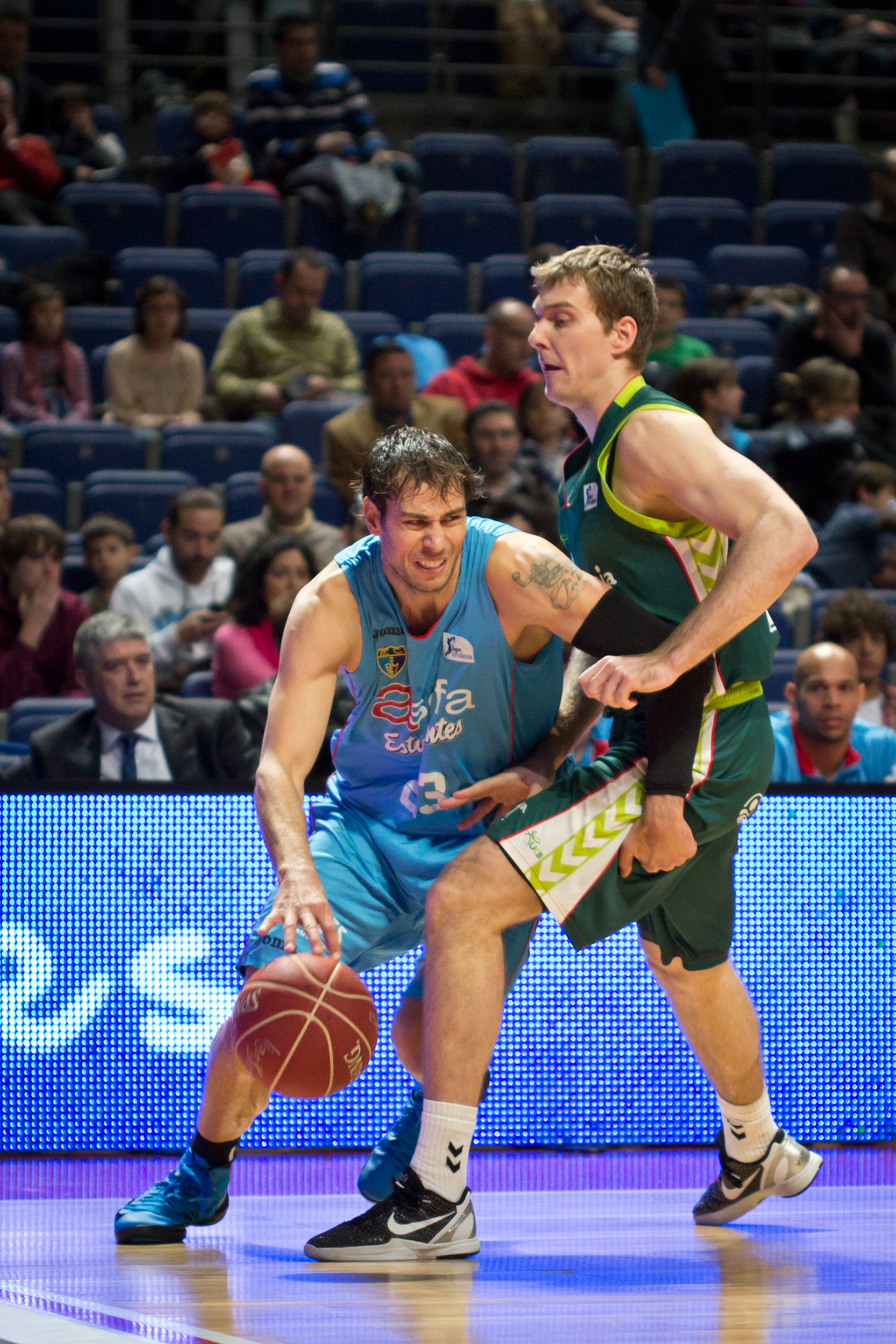
Zoran Dragić (right) contacts Carl English and commits a foul.

In basketball, a personal foul is a breach of the rules concerning personal contact with an opponent. It is the most common type of foul in basketball. A player fouls out on reaching a limit on personal fouls for the game and is disqualified from participation in the remainder of the game.

Players routinely initiate illegal contact to purposely affect the play, hoping it is seen as too minor to be ruled a foul. The threshold is subjective and varies among officials and from game to game. Most contact fouls are not regarded as unsportsmanlike. However, excessive or unjustified contact is penalized more severely. The NBA refers to these as flagrant fouls; other rulebooks call them unsportsmanlike or disqualifying fouls.

== History ==
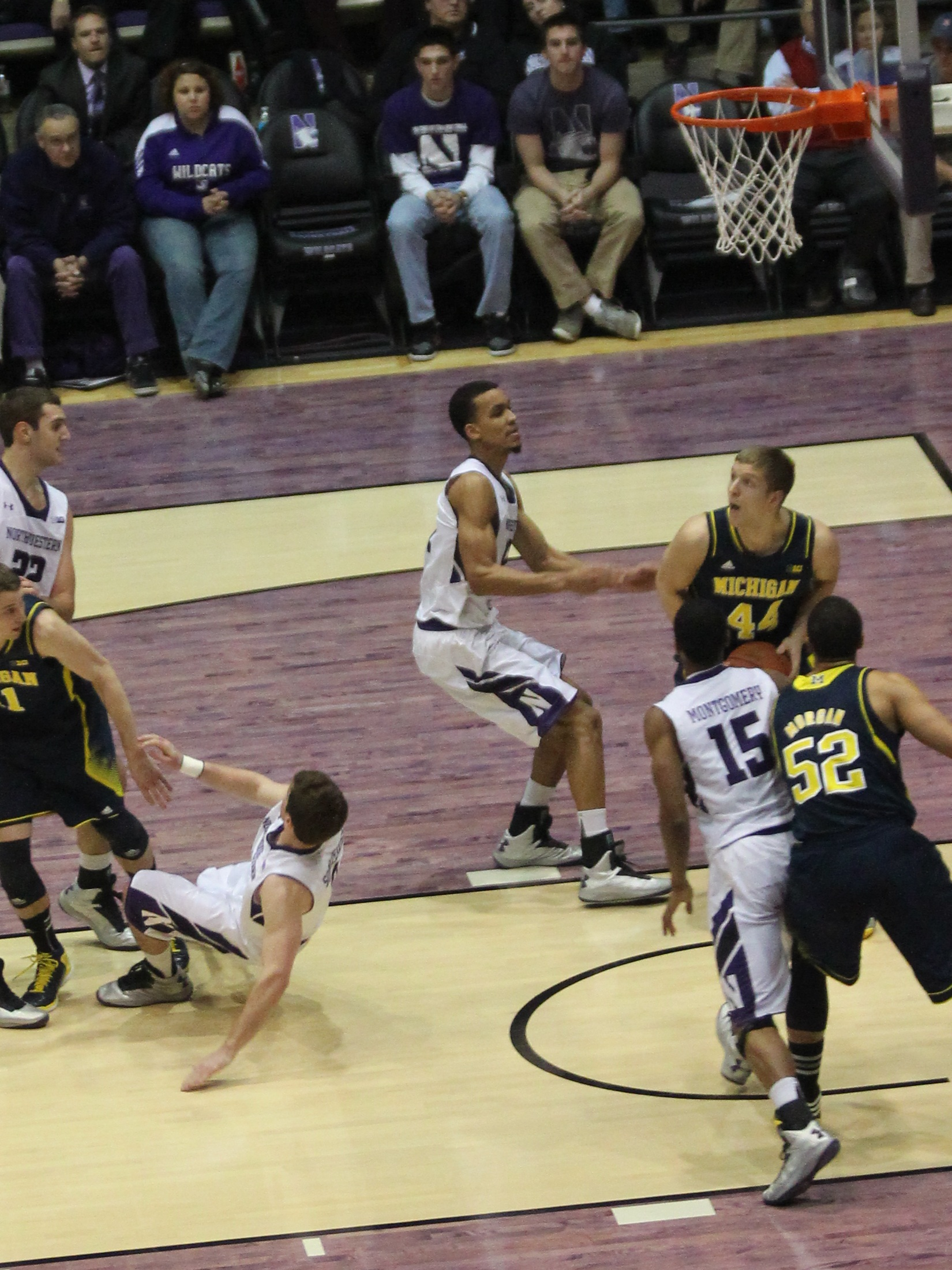
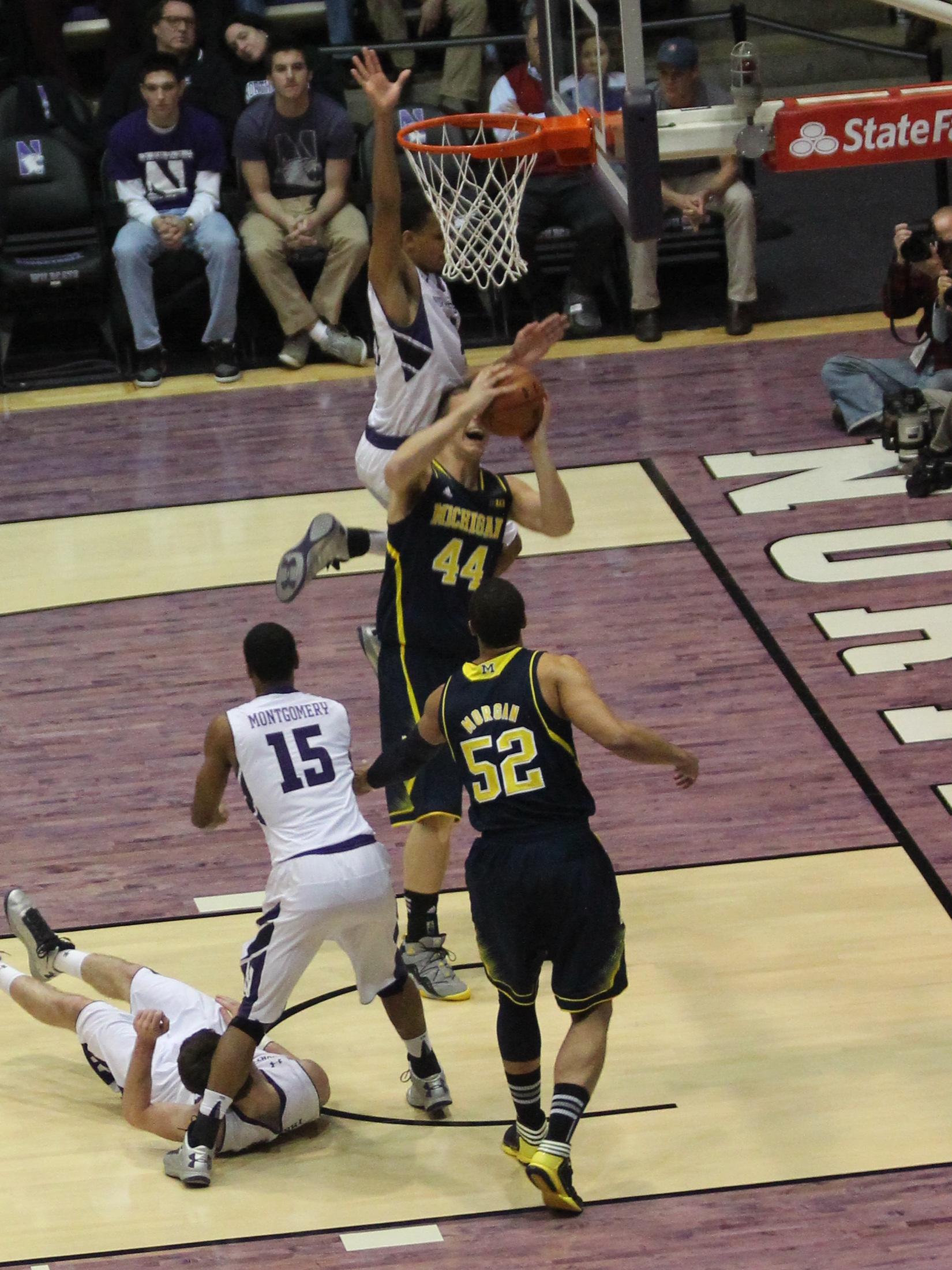
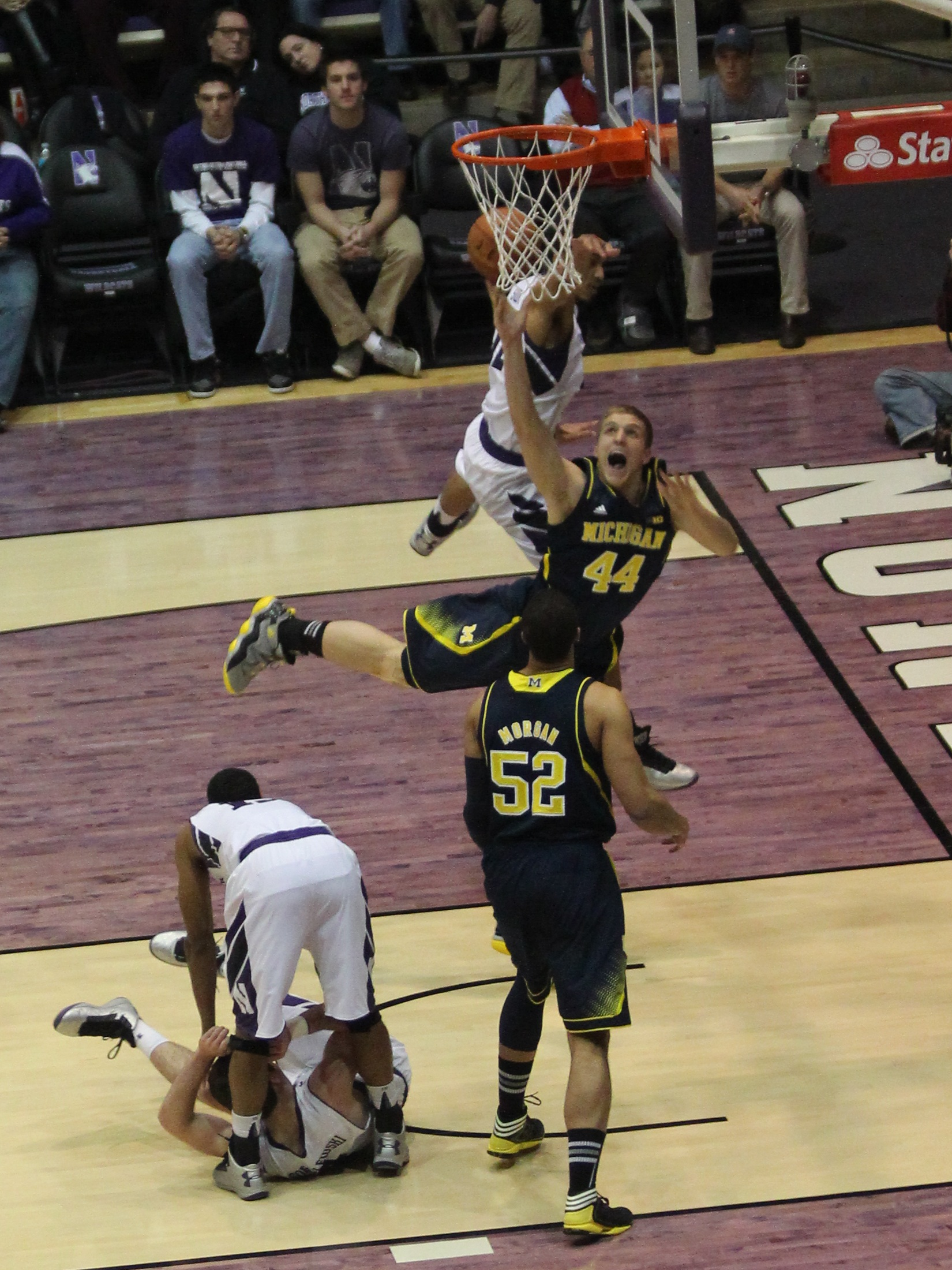
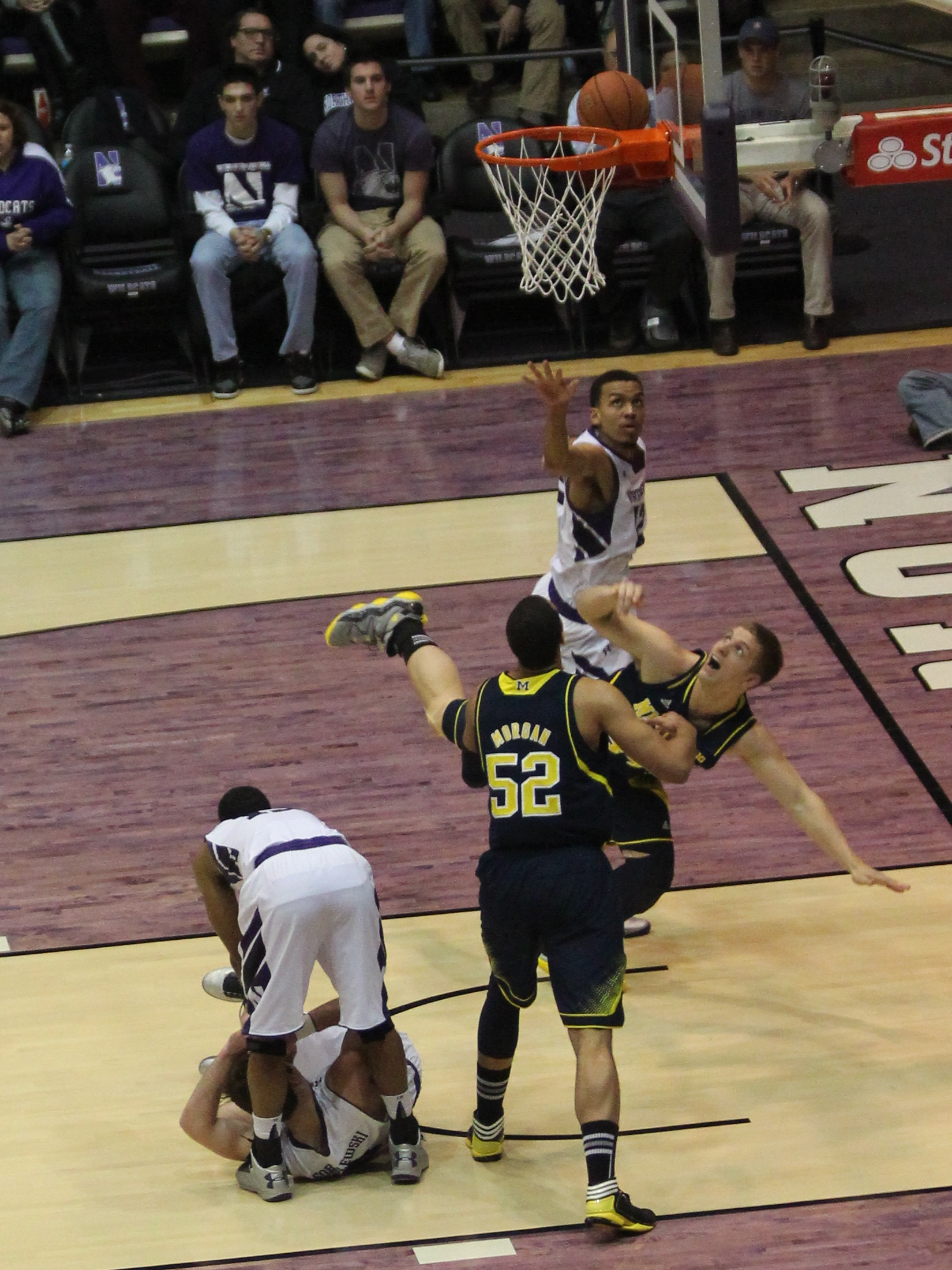
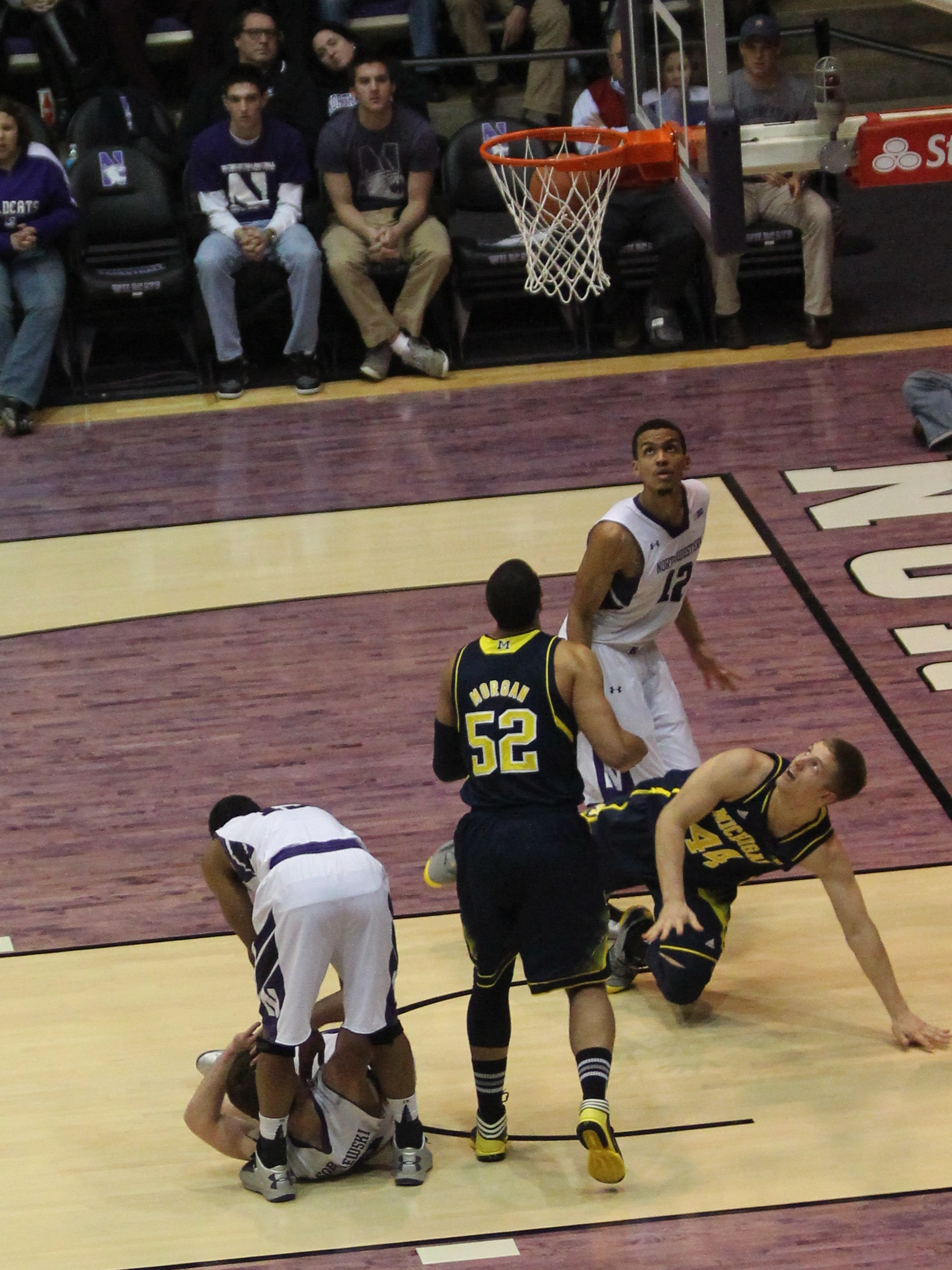
Max Bielfeldt of the 2012–13 Michigan Wolverines men's basketball team playing against Northwestern draws a foul with a pump fake in the team's January 3 2012–13 Big Ten Conference men's basketball season opener.

Basketball has always had the concept of fouls. In 1891, James Naismith's original 13 rules defined a foul as:

- running with the ball,
- holding the ball with the arms or body,
- striking the ball with the fist,
- shouldering, holding, pushing, striking or tripping in any way of an opponent.

Only the fourth definition remains. Running with the ball and striking it with the fist are now violations. Holding the ball with the arms or body is now rare but legal.

Originally, on a player's second foul, the player would be removed without substitution until the next successful goal (similar to a penalty in ice hockey). Before long, free throws were introduced, originally worth three points each, then one. Originally, any team member was allowed to shoot free throws. In 1924, the rules were changed so that the fouled player shot the free throws.

The victim of a contact foul used to be given three attempts at a free throw, and the offense retained possession of the basketball. Now, a player fouled in the act of shooting gets from one to three shots and the other team tends to get possession afterwards (see Penalties below).

== Principles ==
Personal contact does not necessarily constitute a personal foul, unless it gives a player an advantage or puts the opponent at a disadvantage.

=== Cylinder ===
In FIBA, the cylinder principle gives each player exclusive rights within an imaginary cylinder defined:

- in the front by the palms of the hands, when the arms are bent at the elbows so that the forearms and hands are raised, but no farther in front than the feet,
- in the rear by the buttocks,
- at the sides by the outside edge of the arms and legs.

The cylinder extends from the floor to the ceiling, allowing the player to jump upward.

A player can occupy any cylinder not already occupied by the opponent. No one else is allowed to step or reach into this cylinder. A player must not extend his limbs or bend his body in a way that is not normal. If there is a breach of this principle that places the opponent at a disadvantage, the official may penalise it.

The NBA does not use the cylinder principle to judge contact; it only says that a player may not bend or reach in a position that is not normal (nor push, hold, and so on).

=== Elements of time and distance ===
The elements of time and distance concern the reaction time and distance of another person. They apply only to players without the ball, not to the ball carrier. For example, a player cannot suddenly step in front of a sprinting player, even without invading the cylinder. Another example is when a player sets a screen directly behind a player: the player would not physically be able to react to the screen in enough time to avoid it.

== Types of foul ==
Valencia Basket player Justin Doellman is fouled in a Eurocup match.

=== Charging and blocking ===
When significant (Note: The NBA rulebook (officiating guidelines, Section C) repeatedly excludes "negligible and/or incidental ... contact".) illegal contact between the ball-carrier and a defender occurs, it usually means that either:

- The defender committed a blocking foul, or
- The ball-carrier committed the offensive foul of charging.

Deciding between the two is complex, partly subjective, and often controversial.

Generally, the ball-carrier committed a charge if all of the following are true:

- The defender was still, or moving sideways or backward but not forward, when contact occurred.
- The defender took a legal guarding position before the contact, that is, one with both feet on the floor.
- The defender was hit on the torso (as opposed to the arm or leg).

In the NBA, in contact during a move to the basket, officials do not consider the position of the defender's feet, but decide whether the defensive player's torso was set in position before the offensive player began his upward motion. An exception is that a charging foul is usually not called if the ball-handler is within a 4-foot (1.22 m) radius around the center of the basket (known in the rules as the "restricted area" and sometimes colloquially as the "smiley face"). That is, if the ball-carrier is under the basket, the defense usually cannot restrict their movement by drawing a charge. However, a charge can be called if the offensive player receives the ball within an area close to the basket known as the "lower defensive box."

A related call is the player control foul. (Note: NBA Rule 12-B-II states, "The dribbler must be in control of his body at all times.")

Strategy

Apart from using hands in neutral space to shield or deflect a pass or a shot, the defender uses their body to impede the ball-carrier's advance toward the basket. The defender's only absolute way to achieve this is to stand directly in the ball-carrier's path and "draw a charge." Short of this, the defender's use of the body may make the ball-carrier hesitate or change tactics. Both opponents are restrained by their desire not to commit a foul.

It is not a foul to grab for the ball, or to touch a hand of the ball-carrier that is on the ball, but the ball-carrier, especially in the act of shooting, can easily cause greater contact that is a blocking foul against the defender.

Once contact is made, the defender may fall to the ground to exaggerate the force of the collision and induce a foul to be called. (The ball-carrier rarely does so, as it would disrupt the effort to score a goal.) Overt deception is disparagingly called a "flop" and is penalized at every level of basketball.

Screening

A screen is an attempt by an offensive player to stop a defender from guarding the ball-carrier. For example, John Stockton and Karl Malone were well known for their pick and roll (or screen and roll) play. The ball-carrier's teammate is the screener; he stands in the path of the defender as the ball-carrier dribbles past the screener. This at least costs the defender time, and may induce a collision. Either leaves the ball-carrier unguarded. However, if the screener moves towards the ball-carrier when contact occurs, or does not respect the elements of time and distance, or initiates contact, he is charged with illegal screening or setting a moving pick. These are offensive fouls.

=== Other fouls on the ball-carrier ===
In the NBA, the ball-carrier cannot attempt to dribble past a defender where there is not enough space, such as dribbling between a defender and either a boundary or another defensive player. If the ball-carrier has space to put head and shoulders past the defender, then the defender is responsible.

In FIBA, this rule is not codified, but contact caused by the dribbler is still penalized.

=== Fouls away from the ball ===
The rules are symmetrical for contact between offensive and defensive players not involving the ball-carrier. Any player has the right to a position on the court legally acquired. A player acquiring a position that will impede an opponent must respect the elements of time and distance; that is, not take a position so close, or so quickly, that the opponent cannot avoid contact. This includes gradually slowing down after running with the opponent, and situations where the opponent is shielded from seeing the player's movement.

=== Other personal fouls ===
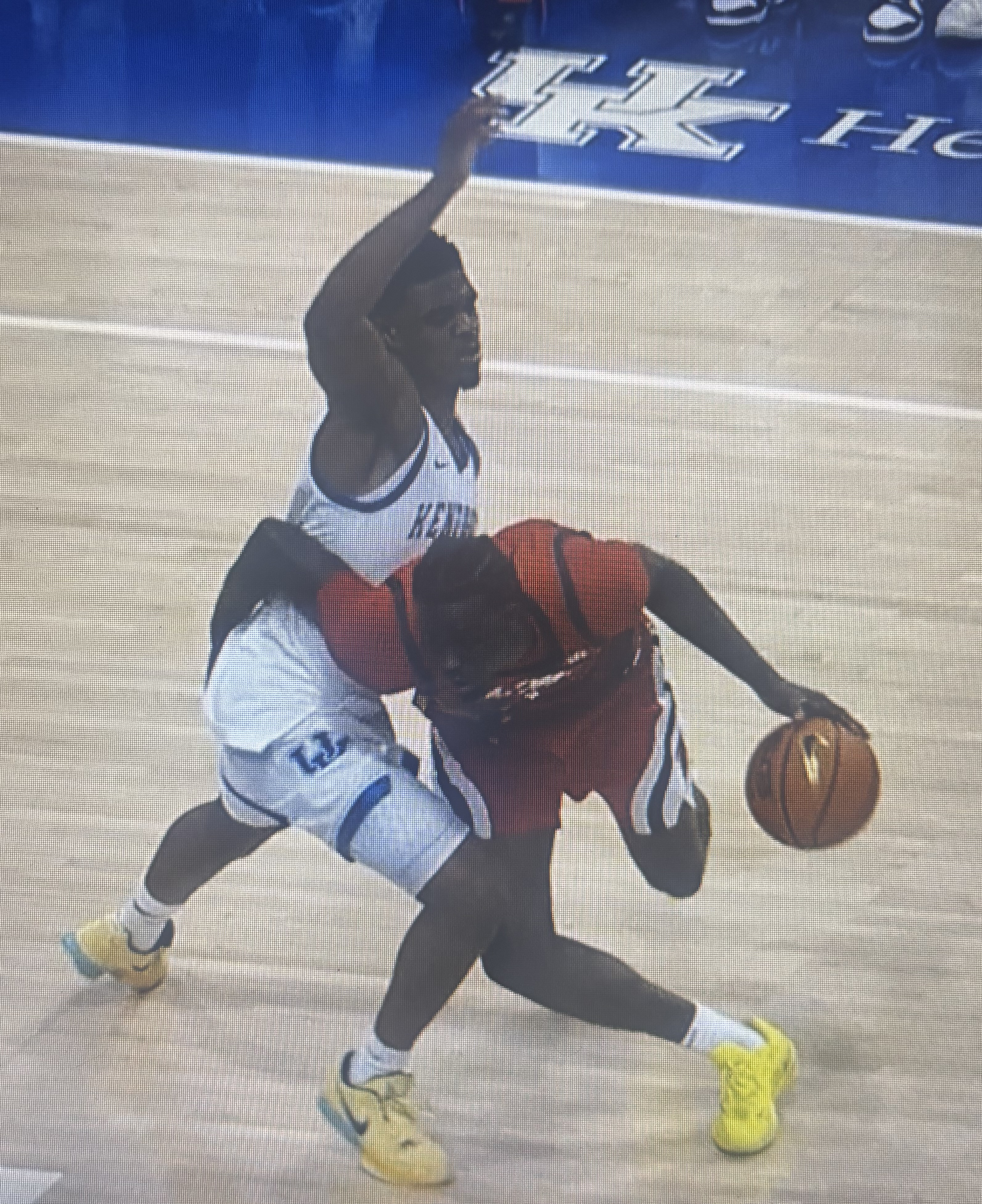
Illegal use of hands by ball carrier

- Pushing – Contact that displaces an opponent (for example, pushing a player away from the basket, or using body weight to affect a player's movement).
- Holding – Contact that interferes with a player's freedom of movement (for example, physically grabbing a player driving to the basket).
- Illegal use of hands – Extending the hands outside the cylinder and causing illegal contact (for example, going for a steal but hitting the player's hand or arm, or hitting the arm of a shooter).
- Hand-checking – Contact by the defense on a ball handler that impedes a player's speed, quickness, rhythm, and/or balance.
- Illegal use of elbow – Moving one's elbow outside the cylinder to disadvantage an opponent. This mostly occurs during a post-up play situation, where either offense or defense attempt to gain a better position.
- Illegal use of legs or knees (on the dunk) – Jumping up with one knee forward as to intentionally hit the defender.

=== Non-foul ===
Referees who called every case of illegal player contact would dominate the game to the exclusion of the athletes, but reluctance to make calls would make the game excessively violent. The rules direct referees to seek a balance between these extremes, though they do not define it. (Note: For example, the start of the NBA's guidance to officials ("Comments on the Rules") discusses the need to "create a balance of play" and "provide reasonable safety...without unduly limiting freedom of action of player or team.")

When players are competing for a ball that goes out of bounds, and one player commits illegal but minor contact, referees often do not feel a foul is justified but resolve the situation by simply awarding possession of the ball to the other team.

The "reach-in foul" is a misnomer. Reaching toward a player is not a foul, though physical contact may be a foul.

== Penalties ==
The official scorer records the foul in two counts of fouls on the scoresheet:

- As a player foul against the offending player during the game. A player who accumulates too many fouls will foul out (see below).
- As a team foul against the offending player's team during the current quarter or half. A team that accumulates too many fouls in that period enters the penalty situation and puts the other team into the "bonus." In men's college basketball (but not women's), another, higher number of team fouls gives the other team a "double bonus" regarding the number of free throws. (See the article on free throws.)

On a foul committed by the defense (and on a loose-ball foul when neither team is in possession of the ball), if the team committing the foul is in the penalty situation or the fouled player was in the act of shooting, the fouled player is awarded free throws. Otherwise, and on offensive fouls, the fouled player's team is awarded possession of the ball to pass inbounds from the out-of-bounds point nearest to the foul. In the NBA, if the fouling player is in the player foul penalty situation, it is treated as a technical foul and any player may take the one free throw, with the shooting team retaining control of the ball. The shot clock is reset.

In some rulebooks, such as that of FIBA, a technical foul is included in the count of player fouls.

If the game goes to overtime, foul counts are not reset, but continue as though overtime were a continuation of the final regulation period. The NBA and WNBA are exceptions, in that each overtime period has its own count of team fouls.

Free throws plus possession

The NBA awards the fouled player free throws followed by possession of the ball in the following cases:

- A flagrant foul.
- A defense foul when the ball carrier is in the frontcourt with a "clear path" to the basket (no defender between the ball carrier and the basket).
- A "take foul" (or "transition take foul"), which occurs when a defender intentionally fouls to disrupt a fast break transition without making a legitimate play on the ball.
- In the last two minutes of the game, a foul against an offensive player other than the ball carrier (a foul "away from the ball").

In full-court play, FIBA awards the fouled player one free throw plus possession of the ball for a "throw-in foul", defined as a foul in the last 2 minutes of a period (either a quarter or overtime) against an offensive player while the ball is out of bounds and either in the hands of the referee or at the disposal of the player taking the throw-in.

Since 2020, The Basketball Tournament has awarded one free throw plus possession for any defensive foul during the Elam Ending (Note: The Elam Ending, created by TBT organizers, sets a target score at a designated point late in the game. The game continues with no game clock but with a shot clock, and ends once one team matches or exceeds the target score.) that would result in bonus free throws at any other point during the game. This was introduced to eliminate an incentive to foul when the offensive team needed a three-pointer to win while the defensive team needed at most 2 points.

=== Strategy ===
Sam Van Rossom scores a two-point shot and is fouled on the same play.

Fans and commentators often speak of a "good foul" when the fouled player would otherwise have made a sure basket. By fouling the player and preventing an easy two points, the defender forces the offensive player to "earn" the two points from the free throw line. However, if the foul does not prevent the player from scoring, the basket is counted and the fouled player gets an additional free throw.

After the fouled player shoots free throws, the team that was on defense is likely to gain possession of the ball. This is by award, if the final free throw was made. Even if it is missed, defensive players can occupy better positions at the side of the lane to get the rebound.

Near the end of the game, a team that is losing may purposefully foul offensive players to stop the clock and regain possession of the ball, with the hope that the player will miss his free throws. Coaches study free-throw percentages, so that the defense will foul a ball carrier who is poor at free-throw shooting. The "Hack-a-Shaq" strategy was famously practiced against Shaquille O'Neal in view of his poor percentage. The defense is not free to foul its choice of the five offensive players, as a foul "away from the ball" results in free throws plus possession. The use of intentional fouls to prolong a game is unique to basketball; most other sports consider such maneuvers a form of unsportsmanlike conduct and impose stiffer penalties to teams that attempt them (see the professional foul and unfair act in football codes).

Foul to give

Near the end of a period, a team may have committed so few fouls that it can commit one or more fouls without putting the opponent in the bonus. It is said that the team has one or more fouls to give. A player who is not close to fouling out can foul an opponent with impunity to prevent a likely score.

To keep games from being bogged down with cheap fouls, the NBA rules provide that the second foul in the final two minutes of a period puts the fouled team in the bonus (enabling free throws) regardless of the number of team fouls.

=== Fouling out ===
A player who commits five personal fouls over the course of a 40-minute game, (Note: In the WNBA, the Philippine Basketball Association (PBA) Developmental League, the limit is 6 personal fouls in a 40-minute game. The Basketball Tournament has a 6-foul limit in a nominal 36-minute game, though because of that competition's use of the Elam Ending, games may end at almost any point beyond 32 minutes. In the NBA Summer League, the limit is 10 fouls.) or six in a 48-minute game, fouls out and is disqualified for the remainder of the game. A player within one or two fouls of fouling out is in "foul trouble." Players who foul out are not ejected and may remain in the bench area for the remainder of the game. Fouling out of a game is not a disciplinary action.

In the NCAA and FIBA, if a team is reduced below five players by fouling out, injury, or ejection, play continues. A team is declared the loser if reduced to a single player.

This rule was invoked in an NCAA game between the Minnesota Golden Gophers and the Alabama Crimson Tide on November 25, 2017. With 13:39 remaining in the second half, a scuffle broke out involving Minnesota players in the game and Alabama players on the bench. Alabama's entire bench was ejected, leaving the Crimson Tide with only five active players. Alabama's Dazon Ingram fouled out at the 11:37 mark, and John Petty left the game with a sprained ankle, forcing the Tide to play the final 10:41 with three players.

In the NBA and WNBA, teams cannot be reduced below five players. A player foul penalty situation exists when only five eligible players remain. If there are only five players, a player who fouls out stays in the game. If another of the five players is ejected or injured, the last player to foul out rejoins the game. Both these cases, and any additional foul the fouled-out player commits, result in a technical foul, with the non-offending team shooting one technical foul free throw (even in cases such as offensive fouls where there would normally be no free throws). These technical fouls are not for unsportsmanlike conduct, so they do not result in ejections from the game.

This rule let Don Otten set the NBA record for personal fouls in a regular-season game. He had eight fouls while playing for the Tri-Cities Blackhawks (now the Atlanta Hawks) against the Sheboygan Red Skins on November 24, 1949. The rule was also invoked in a game between the Los Angeles Lakers and Cleveland Cavaliers on February 5, 2014. With the Lakers down to five players due to injuries, when Robert Sacre fouled out, he remained in the game.

In FIBA-authorized 3x3 half-court competition, players cannot foul out because personal foul counts are kept only on a team basis and not individually. However, unsportsmanlike and disqualifying fouls (equivalent to the flagrant fouls of most North American rule sets) are assessed to individuals, and a player who commits two unsportsmanlike fouls or one disqualifying foul is removed from the game.

In the NBA, disqualifying fouls are two technicals or one flagrant 2 (unnecessary and excessive contact). Bench players and staff are subject to accumulating team technical fouls. The coaching staff is also subject to ejection from the game. Ejected personnel may incur fines as well.

== List of NBA career personal fouls leaders ==
The following list shows the NBA players with the most career personal fouls:

1. Kareem Abdul-Jabbar – 4,657
2. Karl Malone – 4,578
3. Robert Parish – 4,443
4. Charles Barkley – 4,421
5. Hakeem Olajuwon – 4,383
6. Buck Williams – 4,267
7. Elvin Hayes – 4,193
8. Clifford Robinson – 4,175
9. Kevin Willis – 4,172
10. Shaquille O'Neal – 4,146
11. Otis Thorpe – 4,146
12. James Edwards – 4,042
13. Patrick Ewing – 4,034
14. Vince Carter – 3,995
15. John Stockton – 3,942
16. Dwight Howard – 3,912
17. Jack Sikma – 3,879
18. Hal Greer – 3,855
19. Terry Cummings – 3,836
20. Shawn Kemp – 3,826

== See also ==
- NBA records
