= Carrying (basketball) =

Basketball rule violation

In the game of basketball, carrying is a ball-handling violation. Like other violations, the penalty is that possession of the ball is given to the opposing team. Statistically, this counts as a turnover of the ball.

Basketball players can advance the ball by passing it to a teammate, but the ball handler cannot move except while dribbling (bouncing) the ball. Dribbling is subject to several rules that limit the ball handler's advantage. The National Basketball Association Rule No. 10 (Section II (d)) states, "A player who is dribbling may not put any part of his hand under the ball and (1) carry it from one point to another or (2) bring it to a pause and then continue to dribble again."

Carrying is also known as palming. Redirecting the basketball during a dribble is not carrying, provided the ball does not come to a pause. Spectators who misunderstand this may incorrectly identify carries. Carrying occurs only during a dribble; it is legal to have a hand underneath the ball when passing or shooting. This call is rarely enforced especially in the NBA due to its subjectiveness.

Comparable violations occur in other sports. For example, in volleyball, carrying occurs when the momentary contact with the ball is prolonged or used to steer or redirect the ball.

== See also ==
Other ball-handling violations:

- Traveling
- Double dribble
