= Shot clock =

Clock used for pace of play in sports

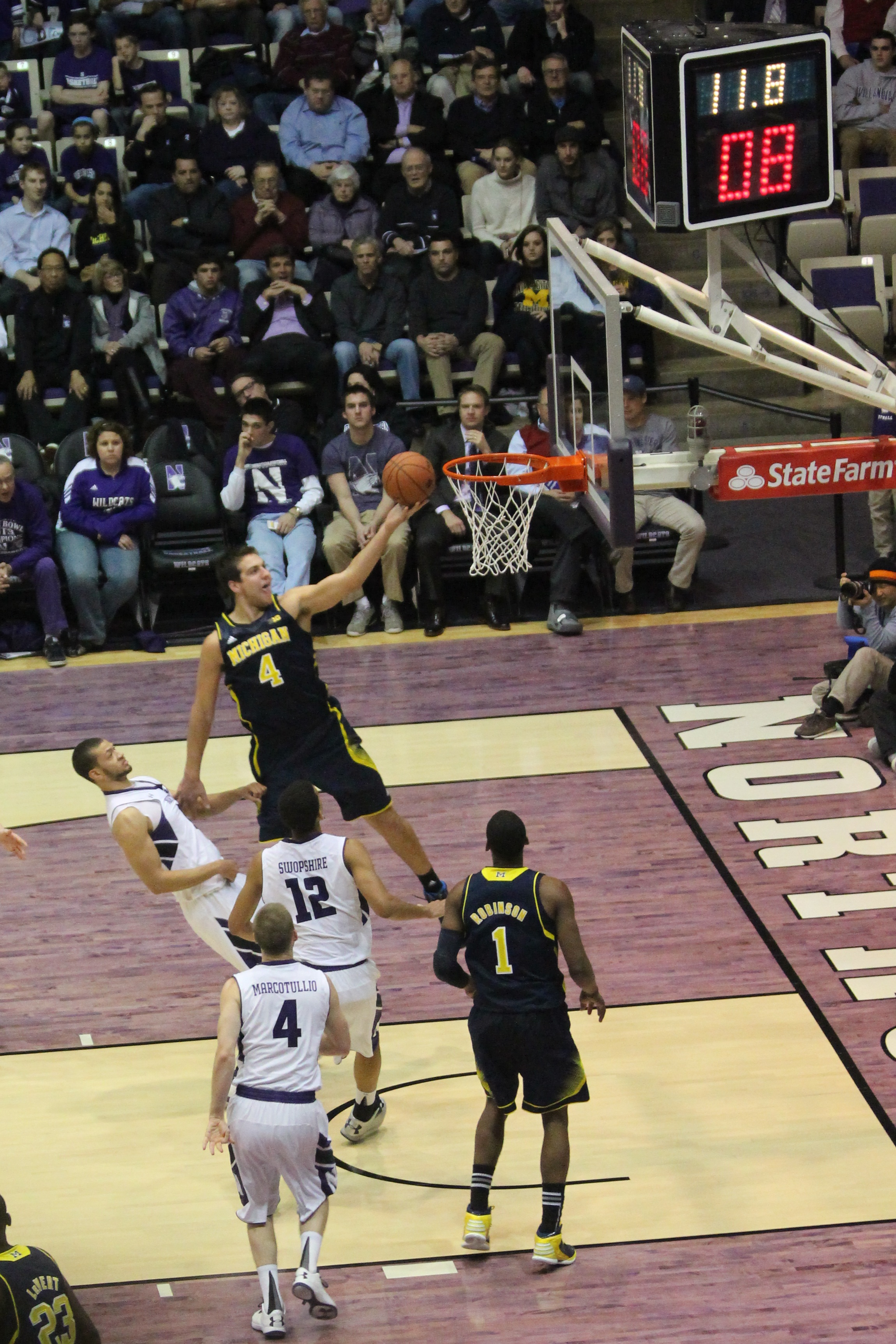
A shot clock in an NCAA basketball game, shown as the red LED digits above the basket.

A shot clock is a countdown timer used in a variety of games and sports, indicating a set amount of time that a team may possess the object of play before attempting to score a goal. Shot clocks are used in several sports including basketball, water polo, canoe polo, lacrosse, poker, ringette, korfball, tennis, ten-pin bowling, and various cue sports. It is analogous with the play clock used in American and Canadian football, and the pitch clock used in baseball. This article deals chiefly with the shot clock used in basketball.

The set amount of time for a shot clock in basketball is 24–35 seconds, depending on the league. This clock reveals how much time a team may possess the ball before attempting to score a field goal. It may be colloquially known as the 24-second clock, particularly in the NBA and other leagues where that is the duration of the shot clock. If the shot clock reaches zero before the team attempts a field goal, the team has committed a shot clock violation, which is penalized with a loss of possession.

At most professional and collegiate basketball courts the shot clock is displayed to the players and spectators in large red numerals below the game clock on a display mounted atop each backboard. In some collegiate and amateur facilities this display might be located on the floor or mounted to a wall behind the end line. A shot clock is used in conjunction with a game clock but is distinct from the game clock which displays the time remaining in the period of play.

The shot clock was originally introduced in the NBA in 1954 as a way to increase scoring and reduce stalling tactics that were commonly used before its inception. It has been credited with increasing fan interest in the then-fledgling league, and has since been adopted at most organized levels of basketball.

== Definition ==
The shot clock is a digital clock that displays a number of seconds or not. The shot clock is usually displayed above the backboard behind each goal, allowing offensive players to see precisely how much time they have to shoot and officials to easily determine whether buzzer beaters should be counted. The NBA specifies that a transparent shot clock and game clock that displays said times on both sides be part of the backboard assembly, and FIBA, EuroLeague, and many venues use this arrangement.

Three signals indicate when the time to shoot has expired:

- A value of 0.0 on the shot clock itself
- An audible horn distinct from the scoreboard operator's signal for end of period and substitutions
- A yellow strip of lights (LEDs) on the backboard. The NBA (since 2011) and FIBA (since July 2018) require this. This is not explicitly required in the NCAA, although some venues will use the red LEDs surrounding most shot clocks or on the backboard (used in the NBA to signal the end of period) to denote a shot clock violation.

In the final five seconds to shoot, the shot clock displays tenths of seconds. This was adopted in the 2011–12 NBA season.

== History ==
The NBA has had a 24-second limit since 1954. FIBA introduced a 30-second shot clock in 1956 and switched to 24 seconds in 2000. The Women's National Basketball Association (WNBA) had a 30-second clock originally and switched to 24 seconds in 2006. Collegiate basketball uses a 30-second shot clock (details below).

=== Background ===
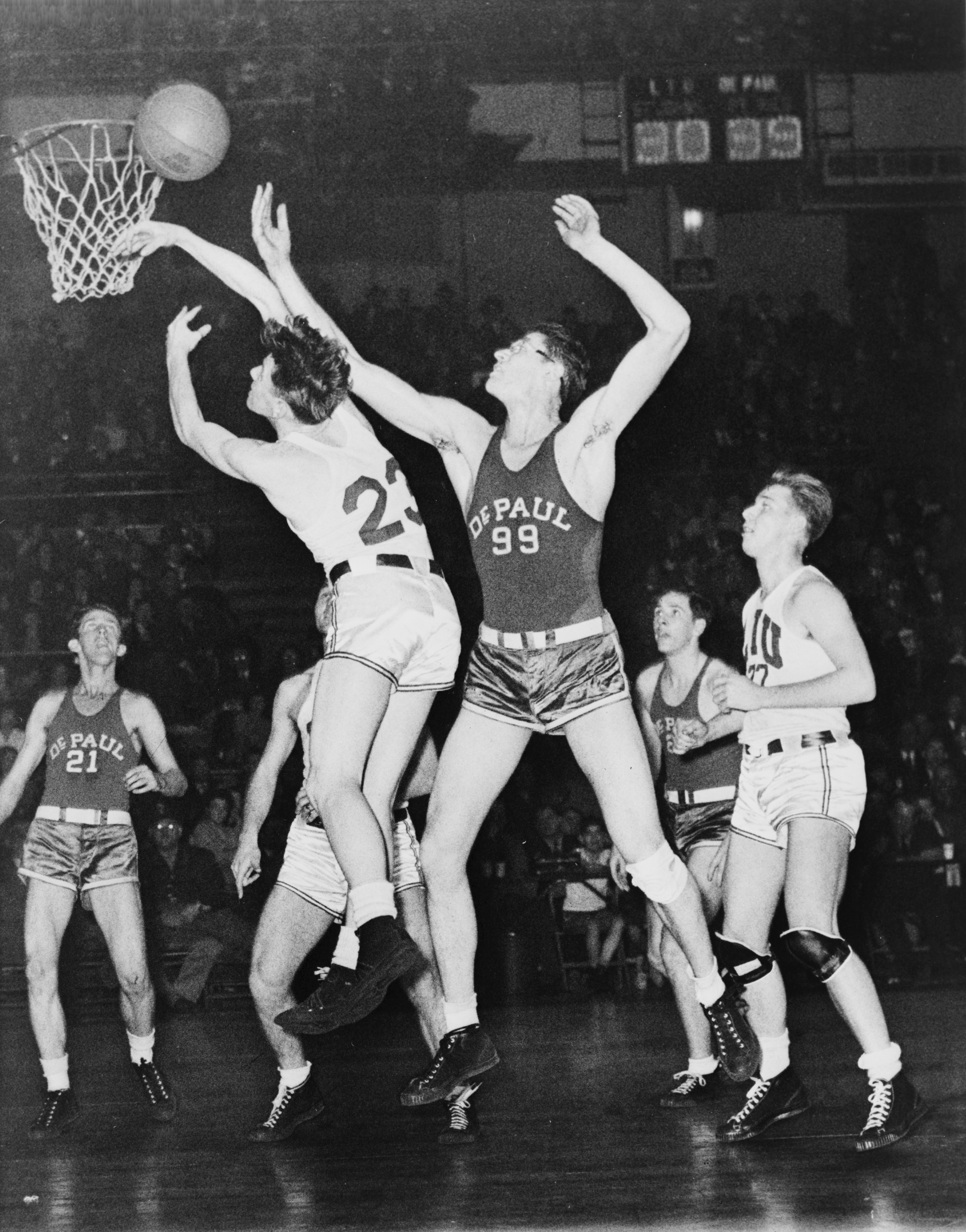
Stall tactics to limit big man George Mikan (#99) led to the shot clock's creation by the NBA.

The NBA had problems attracting fans (and positive media coverage) before the shot clock's inception. Teams in the lead were running out the clock, passing the ball incessantly and turning games into low-energy and defensive stalemates. The trailing team could do nothing but attempt to rebound or commit fouls to recover possession following a free throw. Frequent low-scoring games with many fouls bored fans. The most extreme case occurred on November 22, 1950, when the Fort Wayne Pistons defeated the Minneapolis Lakers by a record-low score of 19–18, including 3–1 in the fourth quarter. The Pistons held the ball for minutes at a time without shooting (they attempted 13 shots for the game) to limit the impact of the Lakers' dominant George Mikan. It led the St. Paul Dispatch to write, "[The Pistons] gave pro basketball a great black eye." NBA President Maurice Podoloff said, "In our game, with the number of stars we have, we of necessity run up big scores." A few weeks after the Pistons/Lakers game, the Rochester Royals and Indianapolis Olympians played a six-overtime game with only one shot in each overtime: in each overtime period, the team that had the ball first held it for the entirety of the period before attempting a last-second shot. The NBA tried several rule changes in the early 1950s to speed up the game and reduce fouls before eventually adopting the shot clock.

=== Creation ===
In 1954 in Syracuse, New York, Syracuse Nationals (now the Philadelphia 76ers) owner Danny Biasone and general manager Leo Ferris experimented with a 24-second shot clock during a scrimmage. Jack Andrews, longtime basketball writer for The Syracuse Post-Standard, often recalled how Ferris would sit at Danny Biasone's Eastwood bowling alley, scribbling potential shot clock formulas onto a napkin. According to Biasone, "I looked at the box scores from the games I enjoyed, games where they didn't screw around and stall. I noticed each team took about 60 shots. That meant 120 shots per game. So I took 2,880 seconds (48 minutes) and divided that by 120 shots. The result was 24 seconds per shot." Ferris was singled out by business manager Bob Sexton at the 1954 team banquet for pushing the shot clock rule. Biasone and Ferris then convinced the NBA to adopt it for the 1954–55 season, a season in which the Nationals won the NBA Championship.

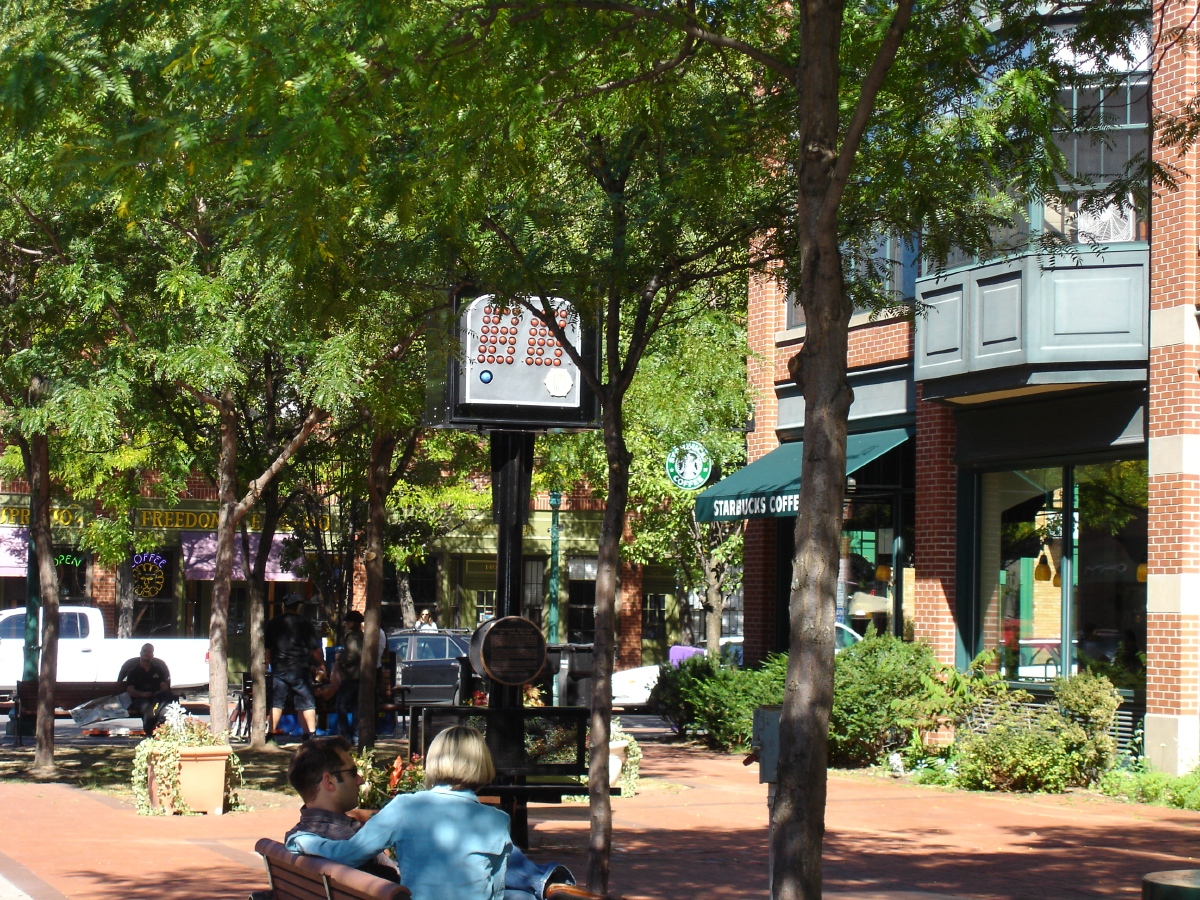
The Shot Clock Monument in Armory Square in Syracuse, New York.

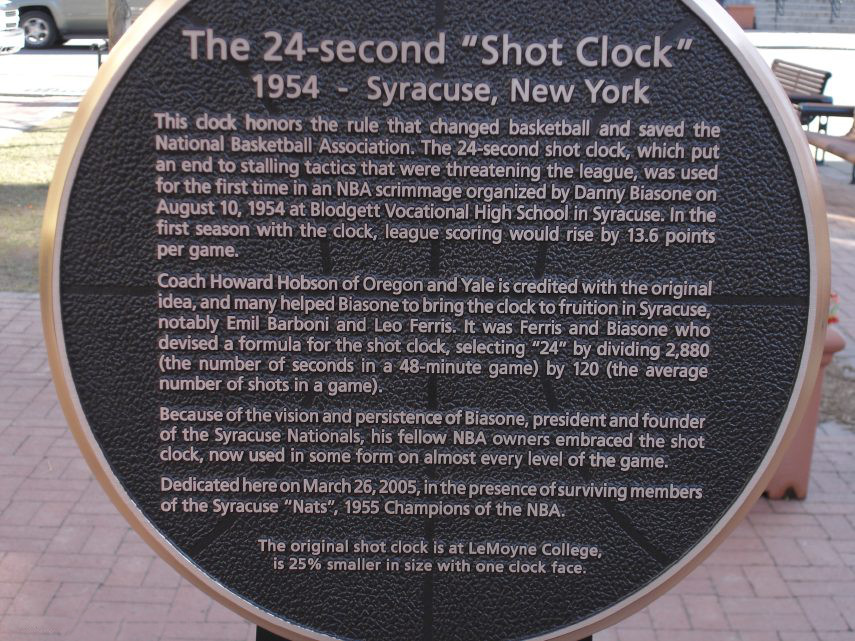
Close-up of Syracuse's Shot Clock Monument.

=== Models ===
Originally, the shot clocks used in the NBA were usually single-sided in a black box. A 1991 rule change required game clocks to be included with shot clocks in the NBA. Eventually, after the rule change, multiple-sided began to be used, and would be in most of the arenas. A 2002 NBA rule change allowing instant replay review of last-second shots required four-sided units in NBA venues, along with an accompanying shot clock light to determine if the shot went off in time. In 2005, the FedExForum in Memphis opened with a new two-sided transparent shot clock developed by Daktronics with a smaller secondary version also accompanying the larger one. By the 2010s, the twin shot clock format, used by Daktronics and Canadian rival OES, became the standard for most venues, especially in NCAA play. In the 2014-15 season, the NBA signed a deal with Tissot, a Swiss watch company, to unify its timekeeping operations, including a double-sided transparent shot clock, which was thinner than its predecessors. Other leagues continue to use older 3-sided and 4-sided shot clock models, though with the progress of technology the newer double-sided style is becoming more common.

Tissot introduced a new circular model for the use of the NBA and WNBA ahead of the 2025–26 season, which will allow for the display of digits in multiple colors and will now also indicate a countdown for coach's challenges.

=== Adoption by other leagues ===
Two later pro leagues that rivaled the NBA adopted a modified version of the shot clock. The American Basketball League used a 30-second shot clock for its two years in existence (1961–1963). The American Basketball Association also adopted a 30-second clock when it launched in 1967–68, switching to the NBA's 24-second length for its final season (1975–76).

From its inception in 1975, the Philippine Basketball Association adopted a 25-second shot clock. This was because the shot clocks then installed at the league's main venues, the Araneta Coliseum and Rizal Memorial Coliseum (the latter no longer used by the league), could only be set at 5-second intervals. The league later adopted a 24-second clock starting from the 1995 season. The Metropolitan Basketball Association in the Philippines used the 23-second clock from its maiden season in 1998. In Philippine college basketball, the NCAA Basketball Championship (Philippines) and the UAAP Basketball Championship adopted a 30-second clock, then switched to 24 seconds starting with the 2001–02 UAAP season 64, the first season to start after the FIBA rule change in 2001.

== Operation ==
The shot clock begins counting down when a team establishes possession, and stops any time the game clock stops (e.g., timeouts, violations, fouls). The offensive team must attempt to score a field goal before the shot clock expires; otherwise, the team has committed a shot clock violation (also known as a 24-second violation in leagues with a 24-second shot clock) that results in a turnover to their opponents. An important distinction is that there is no violation if the ball is in flight to the basket when the shot clock expires, as long as the ball leaves the player's hand before the shot clock expires and the ball proceeds to go into the basket or touch the basket rim.

The shot clock resets to its full length at the start of each period and whenever possession changes to the opposite team such as after a basket is scored, the defense steals the ball or recovers a rebound, or the offense commits a foul or violation. The full length varies by country, level of play, and league; see the table below. The shot clock does not reset if a defender makes short contact with the ball (e.g., an attempted steal or a tipped pass) but the offense retains possession, or if a shot attempt misses the rim entirely and airballs. The shot clock also resets when the offense retains possession after a missed field goal or free throw, or on certain fouls or violations that give the offense an inbounds pass in their frontcourt.

If the offensive team is fouled and the penalty does not include free throws but just an in-bounds pass, the shot clock is reset. There are several cases where the offense is not given a full 24 seconds. The shot clock is instead set to 14 following an offensive rebound. FIBA adopted this in 2014 and the NBA adopted in 2018. The WNBA also observes this rule. In several other cases where the offense inbounds the ball in its frontcourt (such as a foul by the defense not resulting in free throws), the offense is guaranteed 14 seconds. The shot clock is increased to 14 if it showed a shorter time.

On a held ball (whether decided by a jump ball or a possession arrow), the state of the shot clock depends on which team gets possession of the ball.

- If the defensive team acquires possession, the shot clock is reset, as it is on any other change of possession.
- If the offense retains possession, the shot clock is not reset, because there was no change of possession. In the Euroleague, NBA, and WNBA, the jump ball must be caused by a held ball caused by a defensive play (defensive player blocks shot and has hand on ball along with offensive player) in order for no reset to happen.
  - In the Euroleague, NBA, and WNBA, a jump ball not caused by the defense (loose ball plays, held ball on rebound, including the ball being stuck in the ring) results in a full shot clock reset, since both teams may touch the ball.
  - In the Euroleague, the NBA, or WNBA, the shot clock is topped up to 14 seconds, as described above for a frontcourt inbounds pass, should a team retain possession as a result of a violation during the jump ball restart.

Near the end of each period, if the shot clock would ordinarily display more time than there is remaining in the period, the shot clock is switched off. During this time, a team cannot commit a shot clock violation.

The shot clock apparatus itself is considered out of bounds and not part of the backboard. The shot clock operator sits at the scorer's table. This is usually a different person from the scoreboard operator, as the task requires concentration during and after the shot attempt. In the 2016-17 NBA season, a new 'official timekeeper' deal for the NBA with Swiss watch manufacturer Tissot introduced technology to unify the keeping of the shot clock and the game clock. Tissot also became official timekeeper for the WNBA in the 2017 season.

=== Collegiate rules ===
American collegiate basketball uses a 30-second shot clock, while Canadian university basketball uses a 24-second clock.

In men's collegiate basketball, there was initial resistance to the implementation of a shot clock for men's NCAA basketball, due to fears that smaller colleges would be unable to compete with powerhouses in a running game. However, after extreme results like an 11–6 Tennessee win over Temple in 1973, support for a men's shot clock began to build. The NCAA introduced a 45-second shot clock for the 1985-86 season; several conferences had experimented with it for the two seasons prior. It was reduced to 35 seconds in the 1993–94 season, and 30 seconds in the 2015–16 season. The NAIA also reduced the shot clock to 30 seconds starting in 2015–16.

Women's collegiate basketball (at the time sanctioned by the Commission on Intercollegiate Athletics for Women) used a 30-second shot clock on an experimental basis in the 1969–70 season, officially adopting it for the 1970–71 season.

The NCAA specifies 20 seconds rather than 30 after stoppages where the ball is already in the frontcourt. In 2019, it added offensive rebounds to this list.

=== US high schools rules ===
The National Federation of State High School Associations (NFHS), which sets rules for high school basketball in the U.S., does not mandate the use of shot clocks, instead leaving the choice to use clocks and their durations up to each individual state association. In concert with this, the "stall ball" strategy can be used in states or leagues, but depending on the organization, itself, comes with restrictions on its use by the game officials, with overuse of it often being whistled as a foul or unsportsmanlike act. Others may allow stalling completely, at the risk of fan disinterest.

As the cost of shot clock systems can be cost-prohibitive, its use in high schools has been debated more on that consideration, than the flow of the game. While previous proposals for a national shot clock system had been denied by the NFHS as recently as 2011, in the spring of 2021, the NFHS agreed to allow its member associations the option of shot clocks, with a mandatory 35-second duration, starting in 2022–23.

As of August 2021, 11 states either require shot clocks in high school competition, or will begin using one starting in 2022–23: California, Georgia, Iowa, Maryland, Massachusetts, Nebraska (Class A only, expanded to Class B in 2023-24, and all classes in 2024-25), New York, North Dakota, Rhode Island, South Dakota, and Washington. Before 2022–23, the District of Columbia used 30-second shot clocks for public school (DCIAA) competition, charter school competition (as of 2018–19), and the DCSAA State Tournament, wherein public, private, and charter schools compete for the championship of the District of Columbia.

=== Shot clock length ===
==== Shot clock length in basketball ====
Organization	Duration
NBA	24 seconds
WNBA	24 seconds
WBDA	24 seconds
U Sports (Canadian universities)	24 seconds
NCAA, NAIA, USCAA, etc.	30 seconds
United States high school basketball	35 seconds (some states only)
FIBA	24 seconds 12 seconds (3x3 half-court)

==== Shot clock length in other sports ====
Sport	Organization	Duration
Lacrosse	MLL (defunct)	60 seconds
Lacrosse	PLL	52 seconds
Lacrosse	NLL	30 seconds
Lacrosse	NCAA Men's	80 seconds
Lacrosse	NCAA Women's	90 seconds
Lacrosse	New York state high school boys' varsity and JV lacrosse	70 seconds
Australian rules football	AFL	30 seconds
Ringette	International Ringette Federation (IRF)	30 seconds
Water polo	World Aquatics	28 seconds
Canoe polo	ICF	60 seconds
Ten-pin bowling	PBA	25 seconds (only used on TV)
Korfball	IKF	25 seconds
Tennis	ITF	25 seconds
Snooker	Snooker Shoot Out	15 seconds (first five minutes); 10 seconds (last five minutes)
Carom billiards (three-cushion billiards)	World Championship; European Championship; World Cup	40 seconds (3 time-outs (40 sec.) possible)
Poker	World Poker Tour	30 seconds 99 seconds (optional)

=== Related concepts ===
A related rule to speed up play is that the offensive team has a limited time to advance the ball across the half-court line (the "time line").

== See also ==
- Pitch clock, used in baseball
- Play clock, used in American and Canadian football.
- Four corners offense, offensive stall strategy in basketball
- Stall count, used in the sport of Ultimate.
