= Dribbling =

Offense technique in multiple sports

In sports, dribbling is maneuvering a ball by one player while moving in a given direction, avoiding defenders' attempts to intercept the ball. A successful dribble will bring the ball past defenders legally and create opportunities to score.

== Association football ==
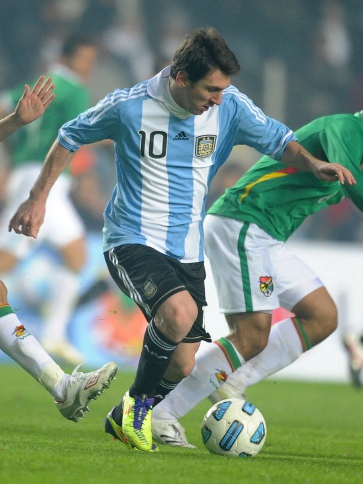
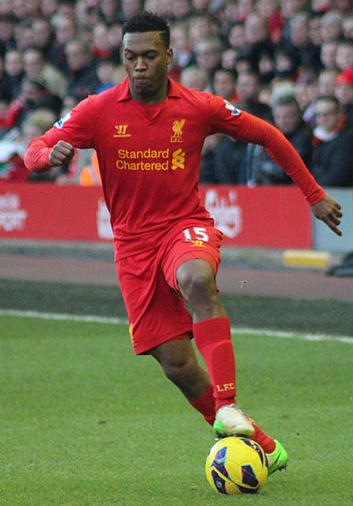
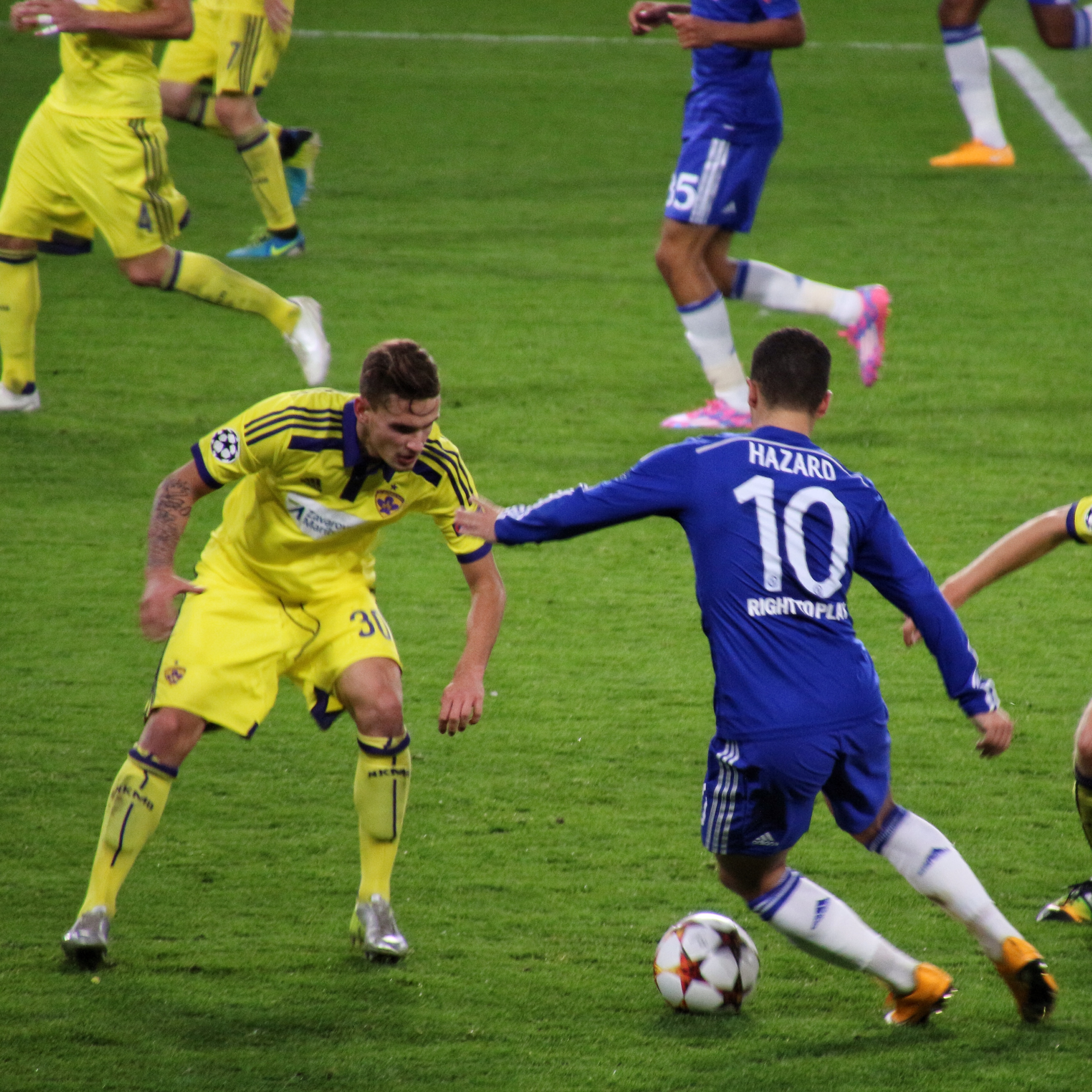
- Left: Lionel Messi gets past two players in a match for Argentina vs. Bolivia
- Centre: Daniel Sturridge dribbles on the break in a match for Liverpool
- Right: Eden Hazard (wearing no. 10) taking on opposition players from Maribor during a dribble for Chelsea.

In association football, a dribble is one of the most difficult ball skills to master and one of the most useful attacking moves. In typical game play, players attempt to propel the ball toward their opponents' goal through individual control of the ball, such as by dribbling (the usage of technical maneuvers). In order to go past an opponent, dribbling can involve a wide variety of manipulative tricks and feints; Ronaldinho would often employ elaborate skills and feints, such as the elastico, in order to beat defenders.

Dribbling is often invaluable, especially in the third part of a pitch or at the wings, where most attacks take place. Dribbling creates space in tight situations where the dribbler is marked by a defender, allowing them to either score or create scoring chances after a successful dribble. However, if poorly mastered, dribbling may result in the loss of possession either when the ball is intercepted or tackled by a defender. Some players prefer getting past players with speed and physicality, such as the winger Gareth Bale, some players go straight at opponents and look to go past them directly with a nutmeg (kicking the ball through their legs), such as Luis Suárez, whereas others may use feints, control, agility, and acceleration to evade tackles, such as Lionel Messi.

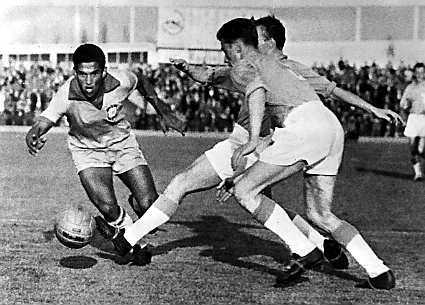
Garrincha (left), Brazilian winger and 1962 World Cup star, is regarded as one of the greatest dribblers of all time.

A skillful dribbler is often hard to dispossess; unsuccessful tackles (which do not reach the ball) may result in a useful free kick situation and a reprimand for the offender in the form of a penalty card. At the 2018 FIFA World Cup, Belgium playmaker Eden Hazard, renowned for being difficult to dispossess, set a World Cup record for successful dribbles completed in any World Cup game since 1966, with a 100% success rate in ten dribbles against Brazil.

Early references to dribbling come from accounts of medieval football games in England. For example, Geoffrey Chaucer offered an allusion to such ball skills in fourteenth century England. In the Canterbury Tales (written some time after 1380) he uses the following line: "rolleth under foot as doth a ball". Similarly at the end of the 15th century comes a Latin account of a football game which was played at Cawston, Nottinghamshire, England. It is included in a manuscript collection of the miracles of King Henry VI of England. Although the precise date is uncertain it certainly comes from between 1481 and 1500. This is the first account of an exclusively "kicking game" and the first description of dribbling: "[t]he game at which they had met for common recreation is called by some the foot-ball game. It is one in which young men, in country sport, propel a huge ball not by throwing it into the air but by striking it and skillfully rolling it along the ground, and that not with their hands but with their feet... kicking in opposite directions". It is known that dribbling skills were a key part of many nineteenth-century football games at English public schools with the earliest reference to ball passing coming in 1863 rules of The Football Association.

== Basketball ==
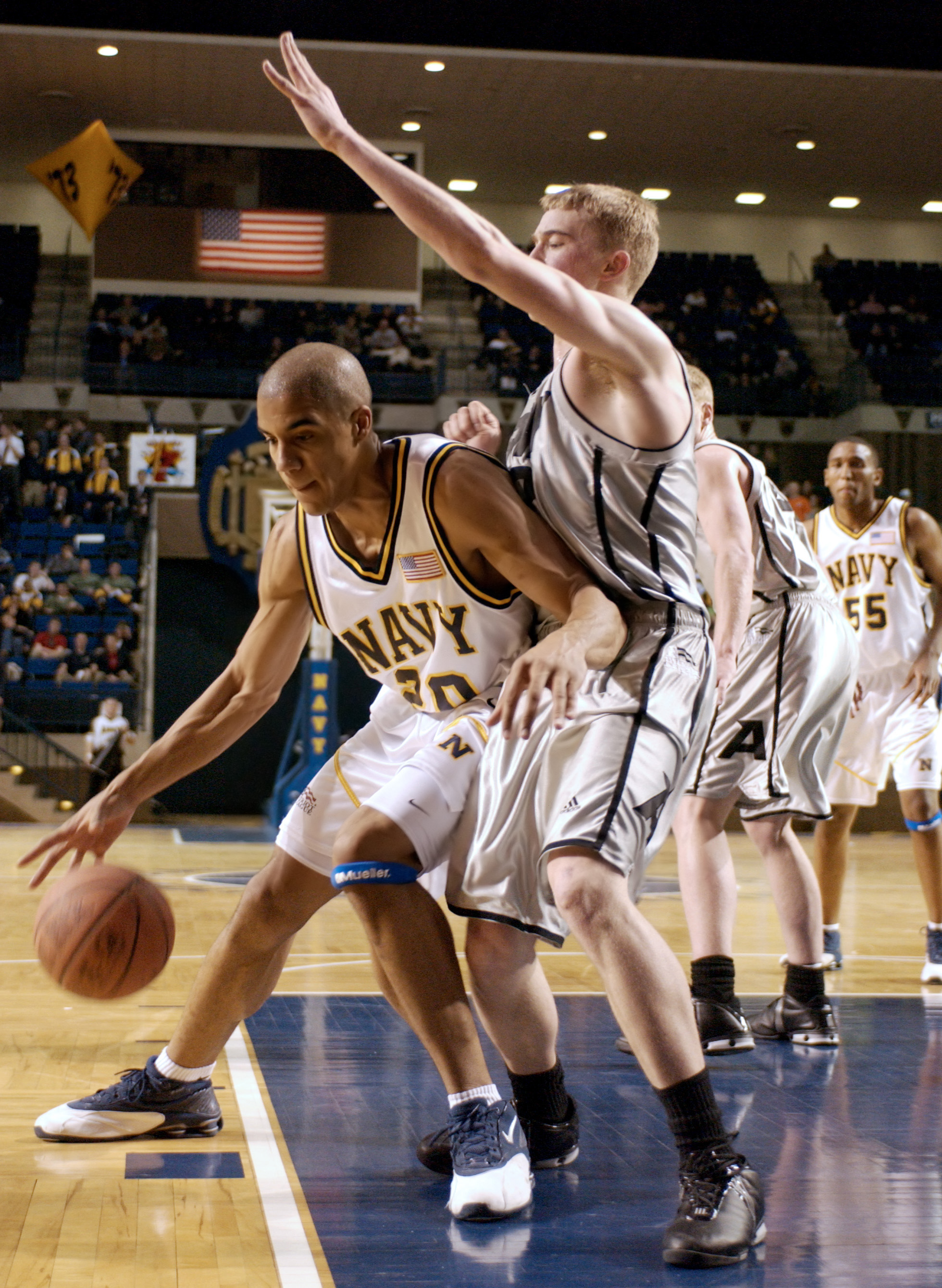
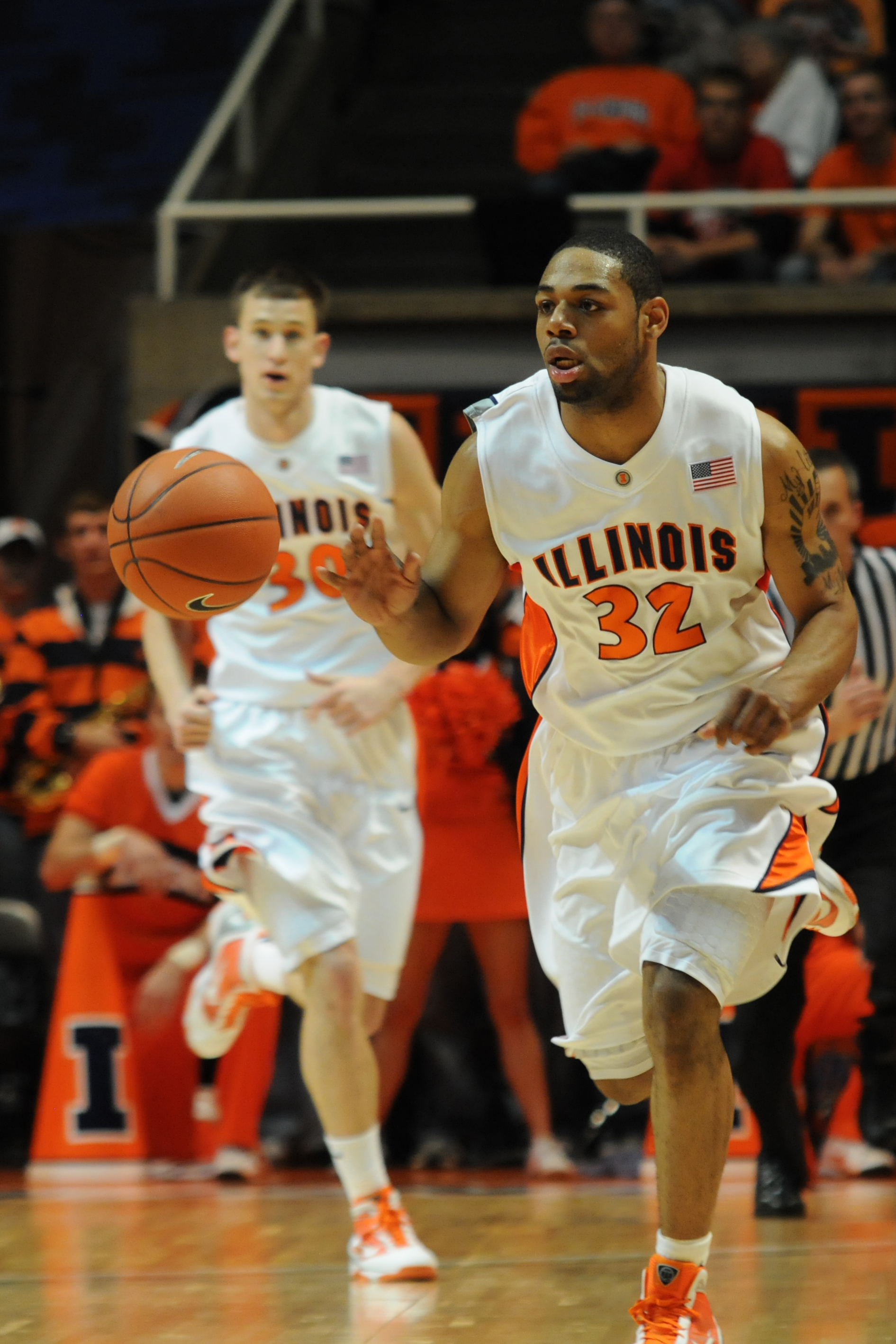
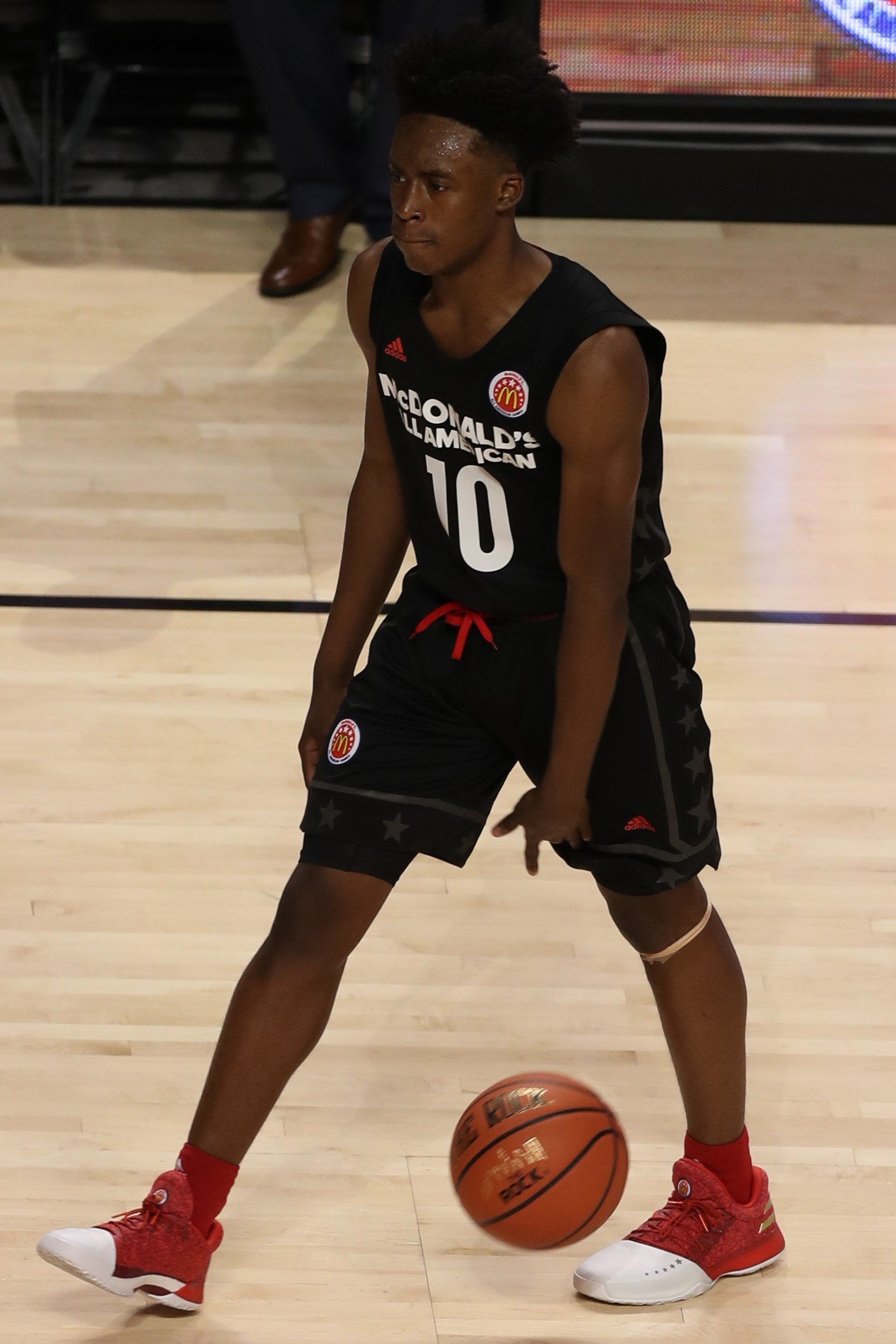
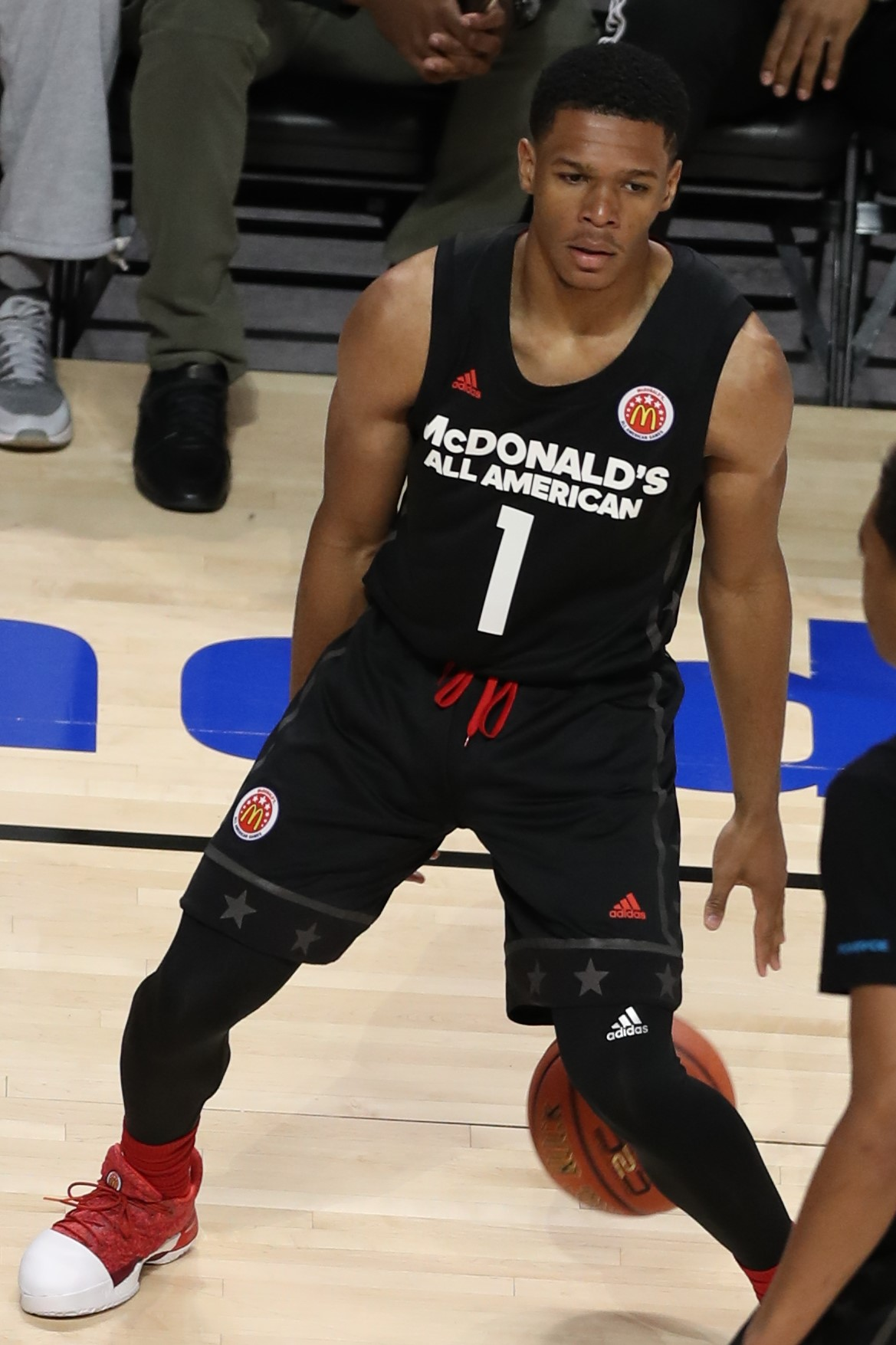
From left to right: Navy player attempts to dribble past Army defender; Demetri McCamey dribbles on the fast break; Collin Sexton dribbles between his knees Trevon Duval dribbles behind his back.

In basketball, dribbling is the act of bouncing the ball on the floor continuously with one hand at a time. It is the only legal way for a player to maintain possession of the ball while walking or running.

Dribbling allows players to move the ball down the court, evade defenders, and create scoring opportunities. It's a fundamental skill in basketball that involves moving the ball around the court with control.

James Naismith's original rules said nothing about dribbling, merely stating that passing the ball was the legal way of advancing it. Players soon developed the strategy of "passing to themselves", which Naismith himself both endorsed and admired for its ingenuity, and which evolved into the dribble as it is known today. The first known team to dribble was Yale University in 1897. In 1909, continuous dribbling and shots off the dribble were allowed.

The dribble allows for much faster advancement and thus more opportunities for scoring. It also provides an opportunity for a crafty player on the opposing team to "steal" the ball in mid-bounce. Once a player stops dribbling the ball and holds it, the player normally must either pass it to another player or take a shot; if the player dribbles and then holds the ball in any way (either grasping it with their hands or arms, or "palming" it, i.e. holding it too much toward its underside during the act of dribbling) then continues to dribble, the referee stops the play, signals either "double dribble" or "carrying", and turns the ball over to the other team. A "double dribble" may also be called if the player tries to dribble with both hands at the same time.

Dribbling should be done with finger pads and the fingers should be relaxed and spread. The wrist should be pushing the basketball, and the forearm should be moving up and down. Skilled ball handlers bounce the ball low to the ground, reducing the risk of a defender reaching in to steal the ball. Adept dribblers can dribble behind their backs, between their legs and change the speed of the dribble, making the player difficult to defend, and opening up options to pass, shoot or drive with the ball. In the contemporary NBA, Stephen Curry of the Golden State Warriors and Kyrie Irving, who currently plays for the Dallas Mavericks, are generally considered the best ball handlers; players like Trae Young of the Atlanta Hawks and Jamal Murray of the Denver Nuggets have also made their mark in the league as great dribblers.

The National Association of Basketball Coaches (NABC) was founded in 1927 to oppose a move to eliminate dribbling from the sport.

== Water polo ==
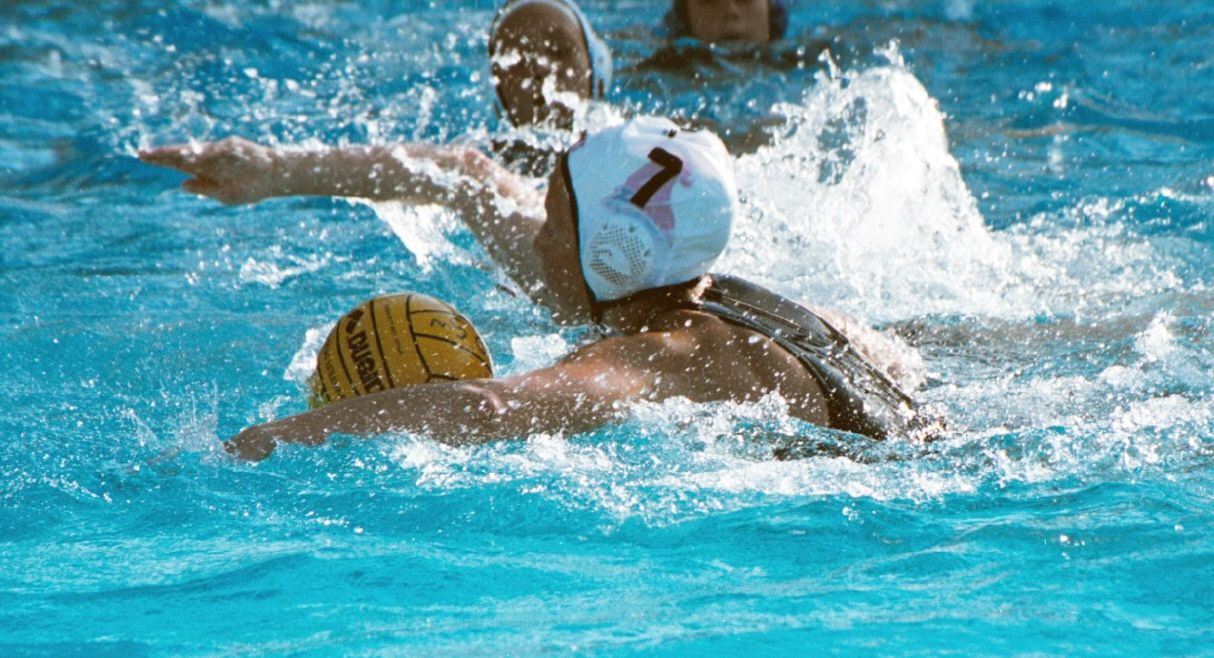
Attacker (7) advances the ball by dribbling

In water polo, dribbling is the technique of moving the ball while swimming forward. The ball is propelled ahead of the player with the wake created by alternating armstrokes, and often accompanied by occasional nudges using the nose or forehead. Since ball contact is minimal, this creates advantage for the ball carrier advancing the ball; the defender may not make contact unless the attacker is touching the ball. Using short, and rapid arm strokes with high elbows, the dribbling player is often able to shield the ball from tackling attempts by the opposing team, particularly those chasing from behind or approaching adjacently. This aggressive defensive technique ensures any tackling attempts, successful or not, risk potential injury as the turbulent elbow motion is considered legal by FINA, and so a defending player must avoid contact in their attempts to steal the ball from the dribbler.

== Related skills ==
The requirement that a player perform a specialist skill in order to be allowed to run with the ball is common and necessary in many sports. Introducing these skills prevents players from taking the ball in hand and running the length of the field unchallenged. In this way, the dribbling is related to:

- the "solo" in Gaelic football, kicking the ball to oneself while running
- the "hop" in Gaelic football, bouncing the ball on the ground and back to oneself while running
- the running bounce in Australian rules football, bouncing the ellipsoidal ball on the ground and back to oneself while running
- in Canadian football, a ball that is loose on the ground and is kicked is called a "dribbled ball", and is subject to different rules than a punt

== See also ==
- Glossary of association football
- Basketball moves
- Glossary of water polo
- Seal dribble
- Step over
