= Time line (basketball) =

Basketball rule

The time line, in basketball, is a name for the center line that reflects the rule that the offensive team has a limited amount of time to advance the ball past this line, from the backcourt to the frontcourt, in a scoring drive.

The time line may have a name that reflects the amount of time, such as "10-second line" or "8-second line". Correspondingly, a violation of the rule may be called a 10-second violation or an 8-second violation.

== History ==
The rule was introduced in 1933. It was basketball's first time restriction on possession of the ball, predating the shot clock by over two decades. FIBA and the NBA specified 10 seconds, but adopted an 8-second limit in 2000 and 2001, respectively.

In college basketball and in men's high school basketball, the interval remains 10 seconds.

== Procedure ==
The time limit is marked off by an official waving his arm to visibly count, if there is no shot clock available or the shot clock is turned off. However, women's college basketball introduced the 10-second limit in 2013–14, and provided that officials will not count the ten seconds but "will use the shot clock to determine if a 10-second violation has occurred." The referee calls a violation if the offense still has the ball in the backcourt when the shot clock has counted down from 30 to 20 and now shows 19 (which first occurs at 19.9 seconds left). Men's college basketball has had the same rule since 2015-16, when the shot clock changed from 35 seconds to 30 seconds. In the NBA and FIBA, the shot clock marks off the 8-second count.

== Analogs in other sports ==
In field lacrosse, a team has 20 seconds to get the ball across the midfield line any way it can, and then 10 seconds to get the ball into its opponents' goal box. To satisfy the latter limit it is not necessary that a player in possession of the ball enter the box; although that is the most common way of doing so, that count is ended if the ball simply touches the ground inside the box. Violations of this rule are referred to as "failure to advance" (or more commonly simply "failure") and as in basketball once the ball is over the halfway line and a team has a touch in the restraining area it cannot be played by the offensive team in its own half. Officials typically use a timer for the 20-second count, as they may also at the same time be counting the four seconds a defensive player is allowed to stay in the goal crease with the ball, and count off the ten seconds manually.

With the introduction of an 80-second shot clock for men's collegiate lacrosse in 2018, officials use the installed shot clocks instead of personal timers to denote the 20-second time and teams no longer must get a touch inside the opposition's restraining box. Instead, they can freely pass the ball for the first 20 seconds of the shot clock but it must be in the offensive half when the clock reaches 60 seconds, after which over-and-back applies.
