= Traveling (basketball) =

Violation of the rules of basketball

In basketball, traveling is a violation of the rules of basketball in which a player takes more than a predefined number of steps while holding the ball. Taking more steps without dribbling than this limit will result in a turnover and possession of the ball for the other team.

In the NBA and FIBA, when a player has taken more than two steps without the ball being dribbled, a traveling violation is called. The NCAA and NFHS do not allow two steps. A travel can also be called via carrying or an unestablished pivot foot. If the pivot foot of a player changes or moves, it is considered traveling.

== In basketball ==
=== Definitions ===
==== NCAA ====
Rule 9, Section 5. Traveling

Art. 1. A player shall not travel with the ball.

Art. 2. Traveling occurs when a player holding the ball moves a foot or both feet in any direction in excess of prescribed limits described in this section.

Art. 3. A player who catches the ball with both feet on the playing court may pivot, using either foot. When one foot is lifted, the other is the pivot foot.

Art. 4. A player who catches the ball while moving or ends a dribble may stop and establish a pivot foot as follows:

a. When both feet are off the playing court and the player lands:

1. Simultaneously on both feet, either may be the pivot foot;
2. On one foot followed by the other, the first foot to touch shall be the pivot foot;
3. On one foot, the player may jump off that foot and simultaneously land on both, in which case neither foot can be the pivot foot.

b. When one foot is on the playing court:

1. That foot shall be the pivot foot when the other foot touches in a step;
2. The player may jump off that foot and simultaneously land on both, in which case neither foot can then be the pivot foot.

Art. 5. After coming to a stop and establishing the pivot foot:

a. The pivot foot may be lifted, but not returned to the playing court, before the ball is released on a pass or try for goal;
b. The pivot foot shall not be lifted before the ball is released to start a dribble.

Art. 6. After coming to a stop when neither foot can be the pivot foot:

a. One or both feet may be lifted, but may not be returned to the playing court, before the ball is released on a pass or try for goal;
b. Neither foot shall be lifted, before the ball is released, to start a dribble.

Art. 7. It is traveling when a player falls to the playing court while holding the ball without maintaining a pivot foot.

==== NFHS ====
The National Federation of State High School Associations (NFHS) traveling rule is almost identical to the NCAA rule, with an additional article clarifying restrictions regarding a player holding the ball while on the floor.

==== NBA ====
Rule 10, Section XIII—Traveling

a. A player who receives the ball while standing still may pivot, using either foot as the pivot foot.

b. A player who receives the ball while he is progressing or upon completion of a dribble, may take two steps in coming to a stop, passing or shooting the ball. A player who receives the ball while he is progressing must release the ball to start his dribble before his second step.

The first step occurs when a foot, or both feet, touch the floor after gaining control of the ball.

The second step occurs after the first step when the other foot touches the floor, or both feet touch the floor simultaneously.

A player who comes to a stop on step one when both feet are on the floor or touch the floor simultaneously may pivot using either foot as his pivot. If he jumps with both feet he must release the ball before either foot touches the floor.

A player who lands with one foot first may only pivot using that foot.

A progressing player who jumps off one foot on the first step may land with both feet simultaneously for the second step. In this situation, the player may not pivot with either foot and if one or both feet leave the floor the ball must be released before either returns to the floor.

c. In starting a dribble after (1) receiving the ball while standing still, or (2) coming to a legal stop, the ball must be out of the player’s hand before the pivot foot is raised off the floor.

d. If a player, with the ball in his possession, raises his pivot foot off the floor, he must pass or shoot before his pivot foot returns to the floor. If he drops the ball while in the air, he may not be the first to touch the ball.

e. A player who falls to the floor while holding the ball, or while coming to a stop, may not gain an advantage by sliding.

f. A player who attempts a field goal may not be the first to touch the ball if it fails to touch the backboard, basket ring or another player.

g. A player is not allowed to be the first to touch his own pass unless the ball touches his backboard, basket ring or another player.

h. Upon ending his dribble or gaining control of the ball, a player may not touch the floor consecutively with the same foot (hop).

Enforcement

According to some observers, enforcement of the rule as written is not necessarily rigorous in the NBA, and traveling violations are often overlooked.

==== FIBA ====
Article 25 of the FIBA Official Basketball Rules 2018:

25.1 Definition

25.1.1. Traveling is the illegal movement of one foot or both feet beyond the limits outlined in this article, in any direction, while holding a live ball on the playing court.

25.1.2. A pivot is the legal movement in which a player who is holding a live ball on the playing court steps once or more than once in any direction with the same foot, while the other foot, called the pivot foot, is kept at its point of contact with the floor.

25.2. Rule

25.2.1. Establishing a pivot foot by a player who catches a live ball on the playing court:

- A player who catches the ball while standing with both feet on the floor:
  - The moment one foot is lifted, the other foot becomes the pivot foot.
  - To start a dribble, the pivot foot may not be lifted before the ball is released from the hand(s).
  - To pass or shoot for a field goal, the player may jump off a pivot foot, but neither foot may be returned to the floor before the ball is released from the hand(s).
- A player who catches the ball while he is progressing, or upon completion of a dribble, may take two steps in coming to a stop, passing or shooting the ball:
  - If, after receiving the ball, a player shall release the ball to start his dribble before his second step.
  - The first step occurs when one foot or both feet touch the floor after gaining control of the ball.
  - The second step occurs after the first step when the other foot touches the floor or both feet touch the floor simultaneously.
  - If the player who comes to a stop on his first step has both feet on the floor or they touch the floor, simultaneously he may pivot using either foot as his pivot foot. If he then jumps with both feet, no foot may return to the floor before the ball is released from the hand(s).
  - If a player lands with one foot he may only pivot using that foot.
  - If a player jumps off one foot on the first step, he may land with both feet simultaneously for the second step. In this situation, the player may not pivot with either foot. If one foot or both feet then leave the floor, no foot may return to the floor before the ball is released from the hand(s).
  - If both feet are off the floor and the player lands on both feet simultaneously, the moment one foot is lifted the other foot becomes the pivot foot.
  - A player may not touch the floor consecutively with the same foot or both feet after ending his dribble or gaining control of the ball.

25.2.2. A player falling, lying or sitting on the floor:

- It is legal when a player falls and slides on the floor while holding the ball or, while lying or sitting on the floor, gains control of the ball.
- It is a violation if the player then rolls or attempts to stand up while holding the ball.

=== Penalty ===
The ball becomes dead and a throw-in is awarded to the opposing team out of bounds nearest the point where the violation took place under NCAA and NFHS rules. Under NBA rules, the ball is awarded to the opposing team at the nearest spot but no closer to the baseline than the free throw line extended.

=== Example ===
- Any action where the pivot foot is lifted and returned to the floor, or dragged along the floor.
- Lifting the pivot foot, taking multiple steps, or shuffling the feet before starting a dribble.
- While holding the ball, jumping and returning to the floor without releasing the ball.
- NCAA and NFHS only: Falling to the floor while holding the ball, even if it was caught while airborne.

=== Clarifications ===
- It is impossible to travel while dribbling. The height of the dribble or number of steps taken per dribble is irrelevant.
- It is impossible to travel during a throw-in. While there are space restrictions for a throw-in, the thrower is not required to maintain a pivot foot or observe any of the other restrictions of the traveling rule.
- A player must have control of the ball to travel. For instance, a player who bobbles a pass may well take several steps legally—the traveling rule is not in effect until he has secured control of the ball.
- A player who dives and catches a loose ball on the floor may legally slide as far as his momentum carries him. This is not a travel. However, once he stops he may not roll over or attempt to stand.
- Lifting the pivot foot alone does not constitute a travel; a player may pass, shoot, or request a timeout in that position. It is a travel once the foot is returned to the floor, or if a dribble is started.
- In the NBA, a player who attempts a field goal may not be the first to touch the ball if it fails to touch the backboard, basket ring or another player. In college (NCAA) rules, there is no longer possession or team control once the ball is in flight for a shot attempt. It is up to the referee's discretion as to whether or not a legitimate field goal attempt was made. In high school (NFHS) rules, being the first to touch the ball in one of the previously described situations is not specifically defined as a traveling violation. Alternatively, such action is not specifically described as being legal play. Thus, while the NBA has defined this action as traveling, and NCAA rules have language that may be interpreted as the opposite, NFHS rules do not comment on such action, leaving any ruling completely to the discretion of the official judges.

== In netball ==
Netball rules do not permit players to let their landing foot touch the ground again if it is lifted at all while in possession of the ball, so players can take 1 1/2 steps while holding the ball. Pivoting does not count as a step. Players are entitled to balance on the other foot if the landing foot is lifted. An infraction of this rule is usually called traveling (or steps) as in basketball.

IFNA Rule 14.3 states:

A player in possession of the ball may not:-
(i) drag or slide the landing foot;
(ii) hop on either foot;
(iii) jump from both feet and land on both feet unless the ball has been released before landing.

A free pass is awarded to the opposing team where the infringement occurred.

== In korfball ==
In korfball, either foot can be used as pivot, no matter which foot touches the ground first. This means that in practice, one can take 2 1/2 steps, e.g. landing on the right foot, putting down the left and displacing the right. The left foot is the pivot in this case. The left foot can then be lifted, but may not be repositioned.

== See also ==
- Euro step
