= Double dribble =

Disallowed action in the sport of basketball

In basketball, an illegal dribble (colloquially called a double dribble or dribbling violation) occurs when a player ends their dribble by catching or causing the ball to come to rest in one or both hands and then dribbles it again with one hand or when a player touches it before the ball hits the ground. The dribble also ends when the dribbler palms/carries the ball by allowing it to come to rest in one or both hands. This is a palming/carrying the ball violation if the player continues with another dribble.

There is no violation during the jump ball, a throw-in or a free throw.

== Early history ==
Contrary to the modern day sport's history, the utilization of the double dribble would be considered a legal move in the sport of basketball back in its early history from around the birth of the sport by James Naismith in the 1890s up until the late 1930s in some professional basketball leagues (similar to how the usage of wire or even rope cages in the professional leagues were considered commonplace around that same period of time as well). The double dribble would only first be considered a penalized move by 1925 when the original American Basketball League would bring in a mixture of professional basketball rules from the past basketball leagues of the time and rules that were commonplace in the Amateur Athletic Union at the time in an attempt to help bring in a more fast-paced game while also being less dependent on bulky strength and being more reliant on strategies that got players moving quickly and more agile in rather clever ways. While the original ABL would only last until 1931 due to the Great Depression, it would officially return two years later in 1933 under (mostly) the same rules as beforehand, with other professional basketball leagues that rivaled the ABL like the National Basketball League and the Basketball Association of America quickly using the same sort of rules that the ABL had done in relation to double dribbling and removing the cages from the sport before the latter two leagues ended up merging operations to create the National Basketball Association in 1949.

== Official NBA rules ==
In the National Basketball Association, a dribble is movement of the ball, caused by a player in control, who throws or touches the ball into the air or to the floor.

The dribble ends when the player:

1. Touches the ball simultaneously with both hands.
2. Permits the ball to come to rest while the player is in control of it.
3. Touches the ball more than once while dribbling, before it touches the floor.

== FIBA rule ==
Art. 24.2 of the FIBA rules provides that:

A player shall not dribble for a second time after his first dribble has ended unless between the two dribbles he has lost control of a live ball on the playing court because of:

1. A shot for a field goal.
2. A touch of the ball by an opponent.
3. A pass or fumble that has touched or been touched by another player.

== Penalty ==
Under NCAA, NFHS and FIBA rules, if an illegal dribble violation occurs, then the ball is awarded to the opposing team out of bounds nearest the point where the violation took place. Under NBA rules, the ball is awarded to the opposing team at the nearest spot, but no closer to the end line than the free throw line extended.

== See also ==
- Carrying (basketball), dribbling by placing the hand palm up under the ball while dribbling.
