= Foul (basketball) =

Unfair act by a player in basketball

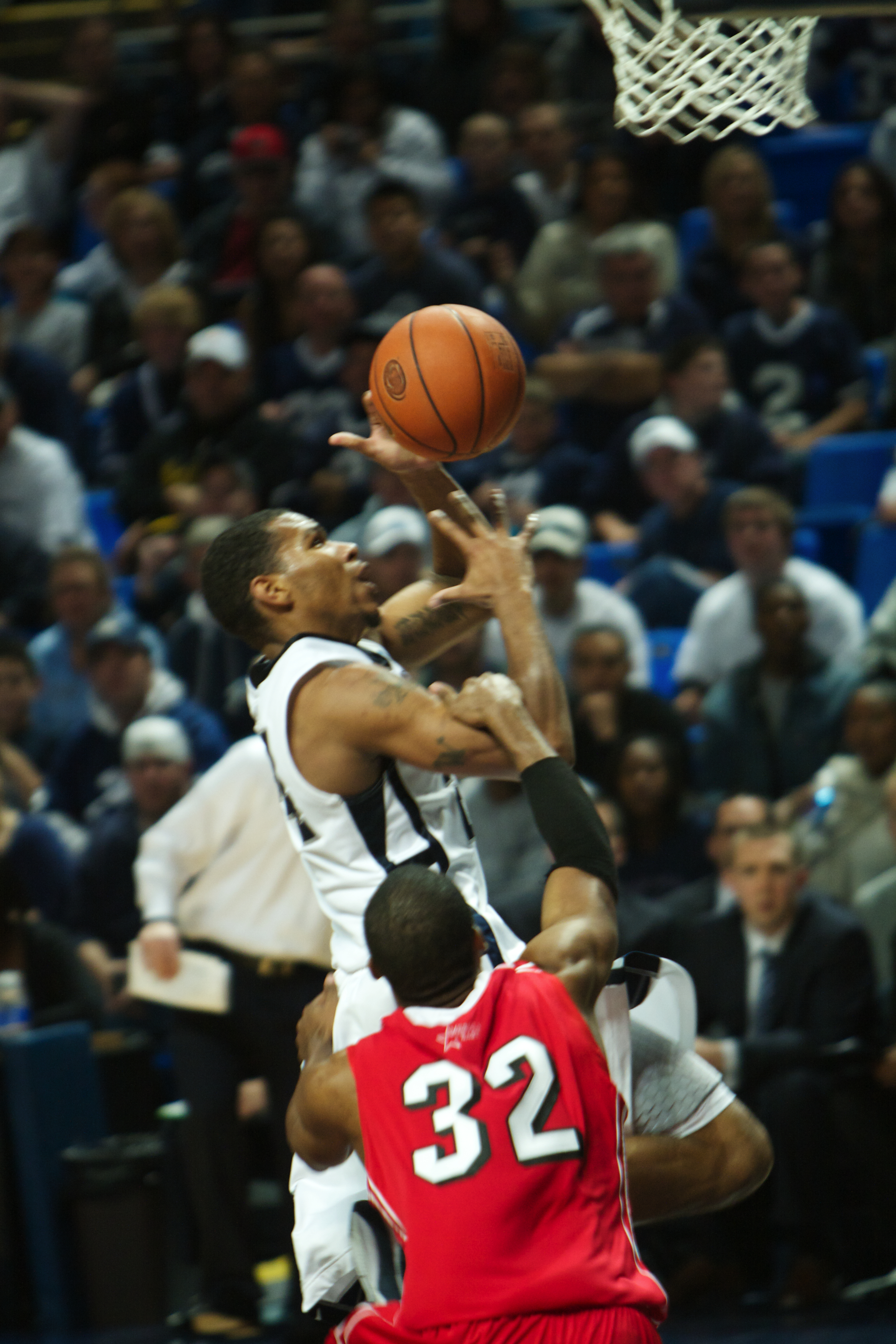
A Hartford Hawks men's basketball player fouls a Penn State Nittany Lions men's basketball player during a field goal attempt in 2011.

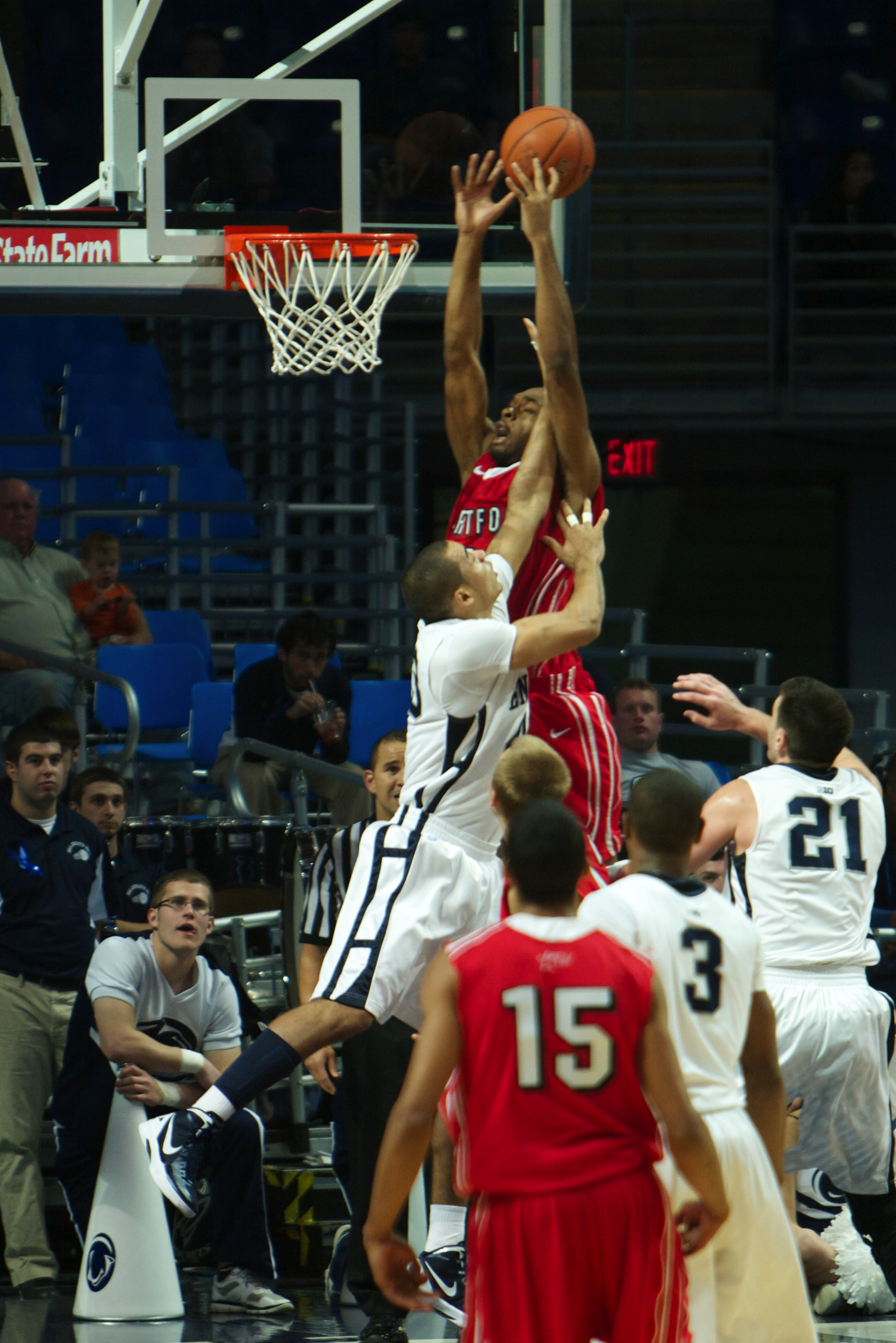
A Penn State player fouls a Hartford player during a field goal attempt in 2011.

In basketball, a foul is an infraction of the rules more serious than a violation. Most fouls occur as a result of illegal personal contact with an opponent and/or unsportsmanlike behavior. Fouls can result in one or more of the following penalties:

- The team whose player committed the foul loses possession of the ball to the other team.
- The fouled player is awarded one or more free throws.
- The player committing the foul "fouls out" of the game.
- The player committing the foul is suspended from some number of subsequent games.

Some of the penalties listed above are assessed only if a player or a team commits a number of fouls above a specified limit.

Ordinary fouls are routine because of the constant motion inherent in the sport and are not viewed as bad sportsmanship. The penalty imposes a cost on violating the rules but does not disparage the player committing the foul. A player intending never to commit a foul might play so cautiously as to be ineffective. More serious fouls are regarded as bad sportsmanship, and the penalties are designed to be disciplinary.

There are several classes of foul, each enumerated below and covered in greater detail in its own article.

== Classes ==
=== Personal ===
A personal foul is the most common type of foul. It results from personal contact between two opposing players. Basketball features constant motion, and contact between opposing players is unavoidable, but significant contact that is the fault of illegal conduct by one opponent is a foul against that player. Most personal fouls are called against a defensive player. A personal foul that is committed by a player of the team in possession of the ball is called an offensive foul. When neither team is in clear possession of the ball, a foul is called a loose-ball foul.

=== Flagrant ===
A flagrant foul is violent player contact that the official believes is not a legitimate attempt to directly play the ball within the rules.

- The NBA and NCAA men's competitions define a Flagrant 1 foul as unnecessary contact, and two such penalties leads to ejection of the player. A Flagrant 2 foul is contact that is both unnecessary and excessive, and requires ejection. In 2019, the NCAA added more words to describe this scenario, including brutal, harsh or cruel or dangerous or punishing.
- FIBA and NCAA women's competitions penalize excessive or unjustified contact between opponents. Their terms for the respective levels of foul are an unsportsmanlike foul and a disqualifying foul.

=== Technical ===
A technical foul is a foul unrelated to physical contact during gameplay. The foul may be called on a player in the game, another player, a coach, or against the team in general. This class of foul applies to all of the following:

- Unsportsmanlike conduct outside the scope of the game, such as taunting, profanity, using offensive racial slurs, or inappropriate conduct toward an official.
- A personal foul committed by a player who has fouled out of the game but is readmitted to the game because of the lack of substitutes.
- Breaking the backboard by performing an excessive slam dunk, or hanging on the rim too long after a dunk
- Requesting a timeout when the team has already used their last allotted timeout.
- Illegal gamesmanship, such as delay of game.
- Arranging the players in an illegal defense.
- A variety of other situations. For example, in some competitions a home team can be assessed a technical foul due to fan misconduct.

In some cases, the rules may call for the referee to give a warning rather than assess a technical foul on the first infraction.

=== Player and team ===
A player foul is any foul, but typically personal and flagrant fouls, by reference to the count of fouls charged against a given player. A team foul is any foul by reference to the count against a given team.

== Bonus situation ==
The bonus (or penalty) situation occurs when one team accumulates a requisite number of fouls. When one team has committed the requisite number of fouls, each subsequent foul results in the opposing team's taking free throws regardless of the type of foul committed.

== Coach's challenge ==
Beginning in the 2019–20 season, the NBA introduced the "coach's challenge". Teams may only challenge personal foul calls on its own players, and out-of-bounds and goaltending/basket interference calls during the first 46 minutes of the game and first 3 minutes of overtime play. Teams must call a legal timeout to challenge a call, which will be returned if the challenge is successful. When a call is challenged, game officials review instant replay footage to determine whether the call should be overturned. Originally, teams were only allowed one challenge per game regardless of whether the challenge was successful. However, beginning in the 2023-2024 season, teams are allowed one additional challenge if their first challenge is successful.

Starting in the 2021–22 season, coaches in the Euroleague and EuroCup Basketball are given one challenge per game.

On October 1, 2022, FIBA published a revision of its official rules of basketball adding a "head coach challenge". Similar to the NBA and Euroleague, each coach is given one challenge per game.

The coach's challenge was introduced into NCAA Division I basketball for both men and women in the 2025–26 season. Under NCAA rules, teams may ask for an "appeal" without calling a charged timeout in a number of instances, including whether a made basket counted for two or three points, to determine whether a called foul can be upgraded to a flagrant foul, properly assessing fouls to the correct player, or timing and scoring errors. Women's teams may also appeal out-of-bounds plays, backcourt violations, and fouls in the restricted area. However, men's teams must "challenge" plays in these scenarios and have at least one timeout remaining to initiate a challenge. Successful challenges will result in the timeout being returned and an additional challenge awarded, while unsuccessful challenges will result in the team timeout being charged and challenge privileges forfeited for the remainder of the game. The on-court officials retain the right to review made baskets, out-of-bounds plays, and timing discrepancies during the last two minutes of the 2nd half (for men) or 4th quarter (for women) and during all overtime periods.

== See also ==
- NBA records
