= Variations of basketball =

Game or activity similar to the standard game of basketball

Variations of basketball are games or activities based on, or similar in origin to, the game of basketball, in which the player utilizes common basketball skills. Some are essentially identical to basketball, with only minor rules changes, while others are more distant and arguably not simple variations but distinct games. Other variations include children's games, contests or activities intended to help the player practice or reinforce skills, which may or may not have a competitive aspect. Most of the variations are played in informal settings, without the presence of referees or other officials and sometimes without strict adherence to official game rules.

== Basketball variations ==
Main basketball variations include:

- FIBA rules
- NBA rules
- NCAA rules

Other variations include:

- Deaf basketball, basketball played by deaf people. Sign language is used to communicate whistle blows and communication between players.
- Pick-up basketball (or pick-up), variation of basketball, typically played on outdoor courts and featuring significantly less formal structure and enforcement of the game's rules usually featuring less fouls than usual.
- Streetball (or street basketball), is a more theatrical version of pick-up basketball, centering the showcase of individual ability and often featuring a spectators.
- Water basketball, a water sport played in a swimming pool.
- Wheelchair basketball, basketball played by people with varying physical disabilities that disqualify them from playing an able-bodied sport.
- Donkey basketball, variation on the standard game of basketball, played on a standard basketball court, but in which the players ride donkeys
- Fantasy basketball, where players take the role of general managers (GMs) of the fantasy teams they create
- Hotshot, a basketball shooting game
- Piterbasket, a team sport closely resembling basketball. The game was initially created for kindergarten children, but is now played by adults and handicapped athletes. Piterbasket was created by Anatolij Nesmejanov in Saint Petersburg, Russia in 2002. In 2010 in Kaunas, Lithuania held the world's first international piterbasket match.
- Rezball, short for "reservation ball," is the avidly followed Native American version of basketball, particularly a style of play specific to Native American teams of some areas.
- Super Shot, a mini-basketball game found in many arcades

Different roster sizes

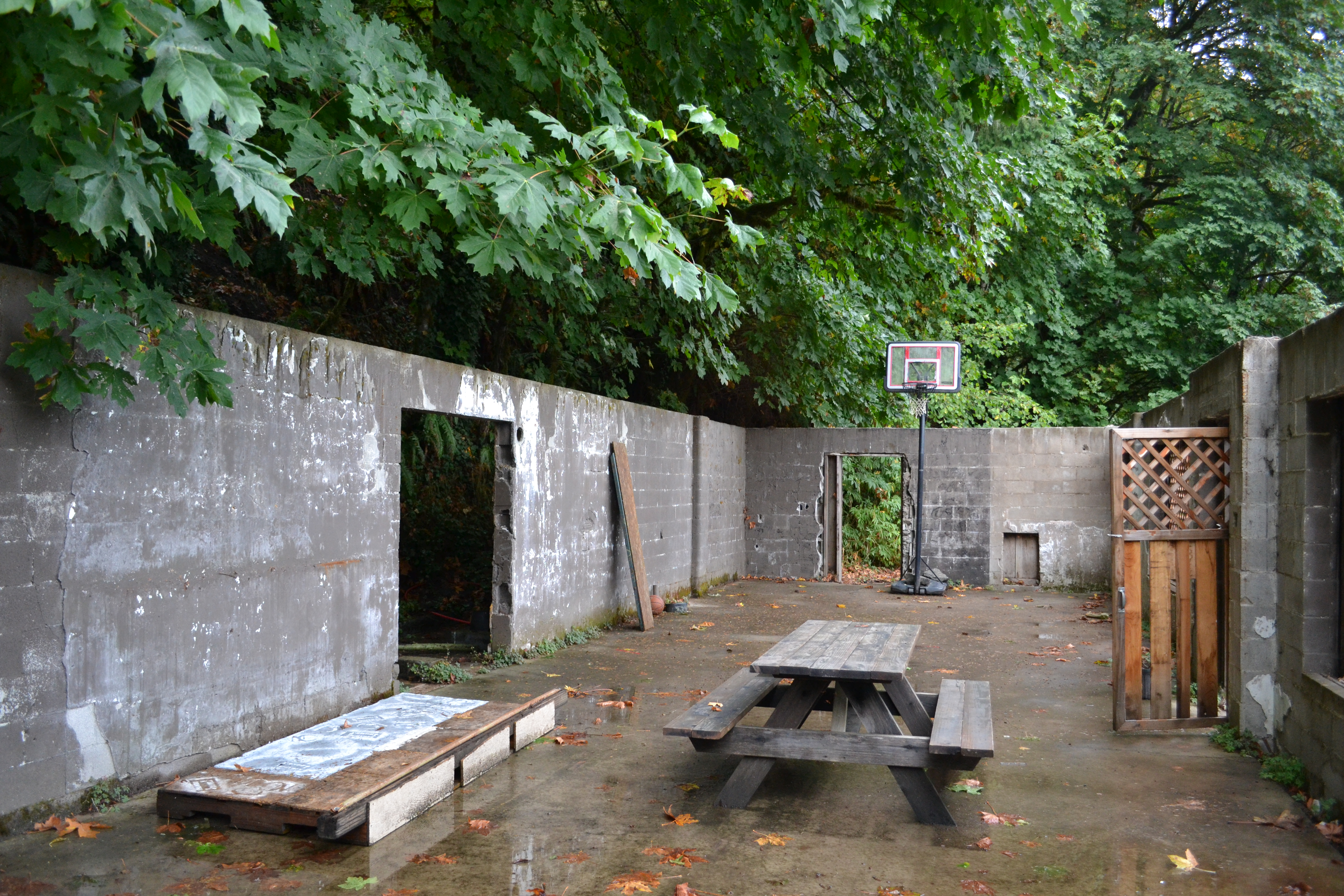
Half-court in Triangle Lake, Oregon

A competitive game of basketball can be played with as few as the team of 2-on-2, 3-on-3, 4-on-4, or 5-on-5.

Each team's roster is typically the same size, but an odd number of players may force one team to play with one less player. Sometimes the odd player will be designated as a "switch" player, so that the offensive team always has the extra player. Roster sizes above five players per team are uncommon, even in informal games, as the court generally becomes too crowded to allow movement and space to develop between players.

- Three-on-three basketball remains competitively played by amateurs. FIBA has created a formalized version of three-on-three, originally known as FIBA 33 and now called 3x3 basketball.
- Six-on-six basketball: was a form of basketball played in the twentieth century mainly among high school girls.
- Twenty-one basketball, game that can be played with two or more players. Each player has their own score, with the winner being the first to reach 21 points. No player has any teammates at any time in the game. The player with the ball may shoot at any time, and may collect his own rebound and shoot again. Whenever a basket is scored, that player receives two points and goes to the free throw line, where each made free throw tacks on another one point to their score. The player is allowed to shoot free throws until he misses, or until he has made 3 in a row, at which point the ball is put back in play, and the sequence starts again. Twenty-one is nearly always played in a half court game.

== More distantly related games ==
Spin-offs from basketball that are now separate sports include:

=== Ringball ===
Ringball is a traditional South African sport that stems from basketball and has been played since 1907. The sport is now promoted in South Africa, Namibia, Botswana, Lesotho, India, and Mauritius to establish Ringball as an international sport.

=== Korfball ===
Korfball started in the Netherlands and is now played worldwide. Korfball (Dutch: Korfbal) is a mixed gender team ball game, similar to mixed netball and basketball.

=== Netball ===
Netball is a limited-contact team sport in which two teams of seven try to score points against one another by placing a ball through a high hoop. Netball was formerly called "women's basketball" but now includes men's teams as well.

=== Pearl ball ===
Pearl ball is a traditional Chinese game which is similar to basketball. Two teams of six players compete to shoot the ball into a net in the opposing team's half of the field; players are required to play in certain parts of the field according to their role, with three players on each team attacking, two holding paddles attempting to deflect the ball away from the net, and one moving around in the scoring area while holding the net itself, attempting to help their teammates score.

=== Slamball ===
Slamball is full-contact basketball, with trampolines. Points are scored by playing the ball through the net, as in basketball, though the point-scoring rules are modified. The main differences from the parent sport is the court; below the padded basketball rim and backboard are four trampolines set into the floor which serve to propel players to great heights for slam dunks. The rules also permit some physical contact between the members of the four-player teams.

== Other basketball variations ==
=== H-O-R-S-E ===
The game of H-O-R-S-E is played by two or more players. The order of turns is established before the game starts. The player whose turn is first is given "control", which means they must attempt to make a basket in a particular way of their choosing, explaining to the other players beforehand what the requirements of the shot are. If that player is successful, every other player must attempt that same shot according to its requirements. Players failing to duplicate the shot acquire a letter, starting with H and moving rightward through the word "Horse". After all players have made an attempt, control moves to the next player, and the game continues on in this fashion. If a player who has control misses their shot, there is no letter penalty and control moves to the next player. Whenever any player has all of the letters, they are eliminated from the game. The last player in the game is declared the winner.

If the players want a shorter or longer game, they can change the length of the word that dictates how many missed shots are needed to get eliminated. Other variations include a requirement that the shot that dictates what other players must make can involve saying something, or making some particular movement. In other versions a player gets a second try on their final shot before getting eliminated from the game, often called “Farmer’s Chance”.

The NBA All-Star Weekend H–O–R–S–E Competition was a contest in which players from the National Basketball Association played the game against each other.

=== Airball ===
This game can be played by as many players as needed. The first shooting line is the foul line.

Each player has an order for when it is their turn to shoot. The first shooter takes their shot from the foul line. If they miss the ring and backboard or Airball on the shot, then they are eliminated, and this is applied to any shot by any player during the game.

If they miss the shot but hit either the ring or backboard then the next player in line must retrieve the ball after it has bounced once but before it bounces twice, then take the shot from wherever they retrieved the ball. If the ball bounces twice, the player is eliminated.

If the shot is made, then the shooter must retrieve the ball before it bounces twice, they then take another shot, if they make 3 shots in a row, then they are able to eliminate another player by hitting them with the ball. The remaining players are able to run away from the shooter but must stop and remain frozen, when the shooter has retrieved the ball after the 3 shot and yelled "STOP". The shooter must then take 7 steps and throw the ball from wherever they have reached. Any player who is touched by the ball is then eliminated. The game is then restarted from the Free Throw line from the next player in line. The game is continued until there is only one player not eliminated. Last player standing is the winner.

Some special techniques used are to start running away from the ring once a shooter has made two shots to ensure that if a 3rd is made, it is more difficult to hit them with the ball. The shooter can negate this by purposefully missing the 3rd shot in the hope the next shooter is too far away to retrieve it. Another technique is to throw the ball very hard at the ring to enable a difficult return for the next shooter.

=== Fives ===
This game is played by 2 or more players. The shooting line is typically the top of the key, but can be moved to the foul line for younger players. Before the game starts, select an order of play. All players (except the one shooting) should remain behind the shooting line, out of the line of play.

The first player shoots from the shooting line. If the shot is missed, the player must retrieve the rebound, and shoot from the spot that the rebound was retrieved. The other players are not permitted to interfere with either the ball or the player. The player continues to shoot until a basket is made to a maximum of 5 shots. When the first player has made the shot, the next player begins shooting, again from the shooting line. This player must make the basket in the same number, or fewer shots than the preceding shooter. The next player then shoots, again from the shooting line and must make the basket in the same number, or fewer shots than the player that immediately preceded him\her in shooting.

If a player takes more shots than the player that immediately preceded him\her, a point is added to that player's score. Additionally, if a player is unable to make a basket in 5 shots or less, another point is added to that player's score.

When a player reaches 5 points, he\she is eliminated from the game. When a player is eliminated from the game, the player immediately following that player has up to 5 shots on his\her turn. The game continues until all but one player has been eliminated. The last player standing is the winner.

=== In and Out ===
In and Out is a game that requires more than three players. One player starts the game by shooting from the free throw line. If they make two baskets in a row, they can eliminate a player of their choosing. If they miss their shot, they must try to rebound the ball, and the person closest to the ball where it lands are the two people 'in play'. Whoever gets to the ball first is the attacker and the other is the defender. If the attacker makes a basket, the defender is eliminated.

There are always two people that are considered 'in play'. [The other nearby players should maintain relatively still so as not to interfere] The primary player is usually the last person to shoot the ball, and the secondary player is the closest moving person to the ball. (If all players stayed frozen, whoever is closest to where the ball landed is automatically 'in play') Whoever then gets the ball is considered the primary player, aka the attacker, and the secondary player is the defender. However, during play, if another person is closer and makes a move for the ball, that person is now 'in play': Again, whoever gets the ball is the primary, and the last person that moved for the ball is now the secondary.

If you are eliminated, you stand off the court, at the foot of the basket, but you can still get back into the game. If a player shoots an airball, you can get back in the game if you are the one to catch it before it touches the ground. You then become the attacker and the person who made the airball shot is the defender. (For this rule, you do have to remain off the court when catching the airball so as not to be actively interfering in the game). The game is over when all but one player has been eliminated. The last player standing is the winner.

additional common rule:

- If a player eliminates a certain number of people by making baskets from the free throw line (a common number is five), then they must then start shooting from the top of the key.
- The last player either cannot be eliminated with a free throw or must be eliminated with an extra shot to end the game, either from the top of the key or from the half court line.
- If the player makes two baskets in a row, if they do not want to eliminate another player, they can get an "extra life". The extra life gives the player another chance if they get eliminated.

=== Around the World ===
Around the World (sometimes called Around the Key) is a basketball variant played by 2 or more players, who have all agreed upon a turn order. The game requires a sequence of shooting positions to be decided upon. The object is to be the first player to make a shot from all positions. When a player makes a successful shot from the final position, the game enters the final stage. Some play such that this player is declared the winner. Others play such that those players who have yet to act on the turn get a chance to tie, which cancels any advantage of going first.

In theory, the shooting positions are arbitrary; in practice, they are most commonly ordered along the 3-point line in equal intervals starting from one of the sides of the basket and including the straight-on center shot (starting from 30°, 60°, 90°, 120°, 150°, and 180° along the 3-point line with 90° being the center). This 180-degree semi-circular path is the inspiration for the game's name. Other common positions are around the key or even under the basket.

Making a shot from a position allows a player to advance to the next position. The rules are very flexible but usually a player keeps advancing until a missed shot. The consequences of missing a shot may vary. Sometimes the game is played such that a missed shot requires the player to start over at the first position. Under this rule, the game may also include another rule that allows a player to "save" their position, and pass the ball to the next player. It is probably most common, however, to play such that each player continues until a missed shot. At this point a player may save his position or elect to take another "chance" shot. If the chance shot is made, the player advances as normal. If it misses, the player's turn ends and they suffer some penalty, perhaps regressing a position or even starting over.

There are a multitude of ways the game can be modified. Other variations include: shooting with the off arm, shooting with alternating arms, or using the backboard on every shot (except those directly to the side of the basket). This game can also be played alone as shooting training.

=== Gotcha ===
Gotcha, sometimes called Lightning, Bump, Gotcha, knockout, Tornado, Speed, or Killer is played by two or more players and requires two basketballs. All players line up behind the selected shooting point, typically the center of the free throw line or the top of the key. The first player in line shoots. If they miss, they rebound the ball and continue shooting until they make a goal. Once the first player throws the ball for his first attempt, the second player may make his first attempt. The goal of the first player is to make a basket before the second player does. If so, the first player recovers the ball and passes it to the next player in line. The goal of the second player is to make a basket before the first player does. If so, the first player is out and play continues as the first player delivers his ball to the next player in line. This pattern follows until all players have been eliminated except one, who is declared the winner. Any new players can typically join the game at the rear of the line until the first player to become out has done so. Typically a new game starts with all players wanting at that time to play lining up at the same shooting point.

Players are usually not required to dribble. In games where dribbling is required, occasional instances of traveling are allowed and double dribble is not enforced. There are no boundaries to the playing field. Some variations allow for a player to use their ball to knock the opponent's ball out of its trajectory in mid-air, but some players discourage this behavior or place limits on it. Softly shooting one's first shot, or throwing it hard against the backboard, in order to quickly recover the ball for a shorter shot is generally considered cheating.

Additional common rules:

- When there are three shooters left, the players can decide to start shooting from the 3 Point line instead, then when there are two shooters left, they can decide if they want to shoot from the half court line or circle.
- If they decide, the players that have been eliminated can stand under the hoop. If the shooters shoot an air-ball (a shot that does not touch the basketball hoop or backboard), the players under the hoop can catch the ball. The player that catches the ball switches places with the shooter that shot the air-ball. Nothing happens if the players under the hoop do not catch an air-ball. This rule is often disputed by the players to be dangerous, because many times the players under the hoop sit down directly under the hoop waiting for air-balls and not paying attention if a ball will hit them.
- The winner is allowed to pick where the new shooting point is.
- The winner of the previous game must go 1st or 2nd in the next game, thus putting him/her at risk for the former or in safety for the latter.
- When a player is eliminated, any other players that player previously eliminated return to play at the end of the line. For example: Alice, Bob, Cami, Dan, and Edgar are playing. Dan eliminates Cami and Bob. Later, Edgar eliminates Dan so Cami and Bob return to play at the end of the line. This variant is called Revenge. The logic for this version is that the winner must eliminate all other players in order to win. A game of revenge can take a long time to finish since any player can be eliminated and return to play any number of times. Some versions of revenge put a limit on how many times a player can return to play; i.e., once a player has been eliminated five times (for example), that player cannot return to play.
- Forcing the second shooter to wait for the shot from the first shooter to touch or pass the rim or backboard before taking a first shot.
- When a player is eliminated, there is a variation not to wait until both balls return to the line. As soon as the first ball is returned, the next player may shoot.

=== King of the Court ===
Another less common streetball variant, often referred to as "King of the Court", or "Boston", results in essentially a one-on-one or sometimes two-on-two tournament between any number of players. Each match is played following normal one-on-one rules, including violations (such as fouls and out-of-bounds) to just one point. The winner remains on the court and gets to take the ball out while the loser returns to the end of the line of players waiting to step on the court. The first player to win a set number of matches (usually 7 or 11) wins the game can only take one shot per turn.

=== Beach basketball ===
Beach basketball may be played on concrete or on sand. It was invented in the United States by Philip Bryant in the early 1980s on the PE fields of Gulf Shores School in Gulf Shores, Alabama. The game is played on a circular court with no backboard on the goal. There are no out-of-bounds, ball movement is via the pass or 2½ steps, and there is no dribbling. Eighteen World Beach Basketball Association World Championships have been played over the years.

German beach basketball uses a beach court smaller than a standard basketball court and without lines. Over the year, several tournaments are held, ending in the German championship which is organized by the German basketball federation.

Rules:

- Each team has three players plus a maximum of two players to change.
- The court consists of a sand surface in the range of about 12–15 m, and two opposing basketball baskets and backboard, which are situated on the short sides of the pitch. Basically, there are no out lines.
- A game lasts ten minutes, divided into two halves to five minutes. At halftime, the sides are changed.
- In a tournament team mentioned first at the beginning of the first half is in the possession of the ball. The second mentioned team has the ball in the second halftime.
- If the ball falls in the sand, the player first touches the ball may take the ball and continue unhindered.
- In the event of a tie during normal play, the match is decided with a free throw shoot-out. Each player gets one free throw for their team.
