= 100% Fanáticos =

100% Fanáticos (100% fans) is a Peruvian sports program, shown on Cable Mágico Deportes (CMD). Its first format was on air from to 2010, with a three-month break between the first and the second season. Its new format started on 2014.

The show consists of teams testing their knowledge of sports, and is currently hosted by Óscar del Portal. In its first format, it was hosted by Peruvian actor and model Gian Piero Díaz.
