= Gaming in China =

Gaming in China could refer to:

- Video gaming in China
- Online gaming in China
- Sports in China
- Traditional games of China
- National Games of China
