= Pearl ball =

Traditional Chinese variation of basketball

Pearl ball is a traditional Chinese game which is similar to basketball. Two teams of six players compete to shoot the ball into a net in the opposing team's half of the field; players are required to play in certain parts of the field according to their role, with three players on each team attacking, two holding paddles attempting to deflect the ball away from the net, and one moving around in the scoring area while holding the net itself, attempting to help their teammates score.

The game is a traditional sport of the Manchu people. It originates from Manchu pearl diving into the rivers of Manchuria during Imperial China, where divers would play the game for leisure after pearling. In Manchu, the game is also called Ti He (pearl-kicking), Cai He (pearl-picking), and Reng He (pearl-tossing). It is recognised as an official sport of China by the Chinese Olympic Committee, and is played in the Chinese National Ethnic Games.

== Rules ==
A match of pearl ball is divided into two 15-minutes halves with 10-minute breaks in between.

The field is 28 by 15 metres (92 by 49 ft), and is separated into three areas - the competition, defence, and scoring zones.
