= Pick-up basketball =

Basketball game spontaneously started by a group of players

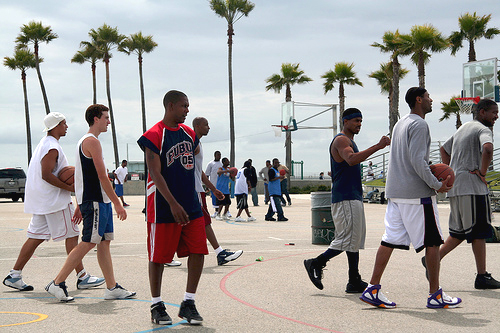
Pick-up basketball at the Venice Beach basketball courts in Los Angeles, California

Pick-up basketball (also known as pick-up) is a version of basketball that has been spontaneously started by a group of players. Players can be invited to show up beforehand, but unlike exhibition games, there is no sense of obligation or commitment to play. Pick-up games characteristically lack referees, leading to substantially less formal structure than regular games. Therefore, pick-up basketball is heavily reliant upon informal structure that emerges from locally embedded norms and consensus building. A more theatrical version of pick-up basketball, the streetball game, centers the showcase of individual ability, often featuring a spectators and an MC.

== Rules and features ==
Pick-up rules vary widely from court to court and can be modified to accommodate the environment, number of players, and skill level. Games operate as through self officiation. Often, a "call your own foul" rule is in effect, and a player who believes he has been fouled, simply needs to call out "Foul!", and play will be stopped, with the ball awarded to the fouled player's team (free throws are not usually awarded in pick-up), usually after a brief debate over the alleged foul.

Calling fouls is generally disfavored. The etiquette of what rightly constitutes a foul, as well as the permissible amount of protestation against such a call, are the products of individual groups, and of the seriousness of a particular game.

=== Game structure ===
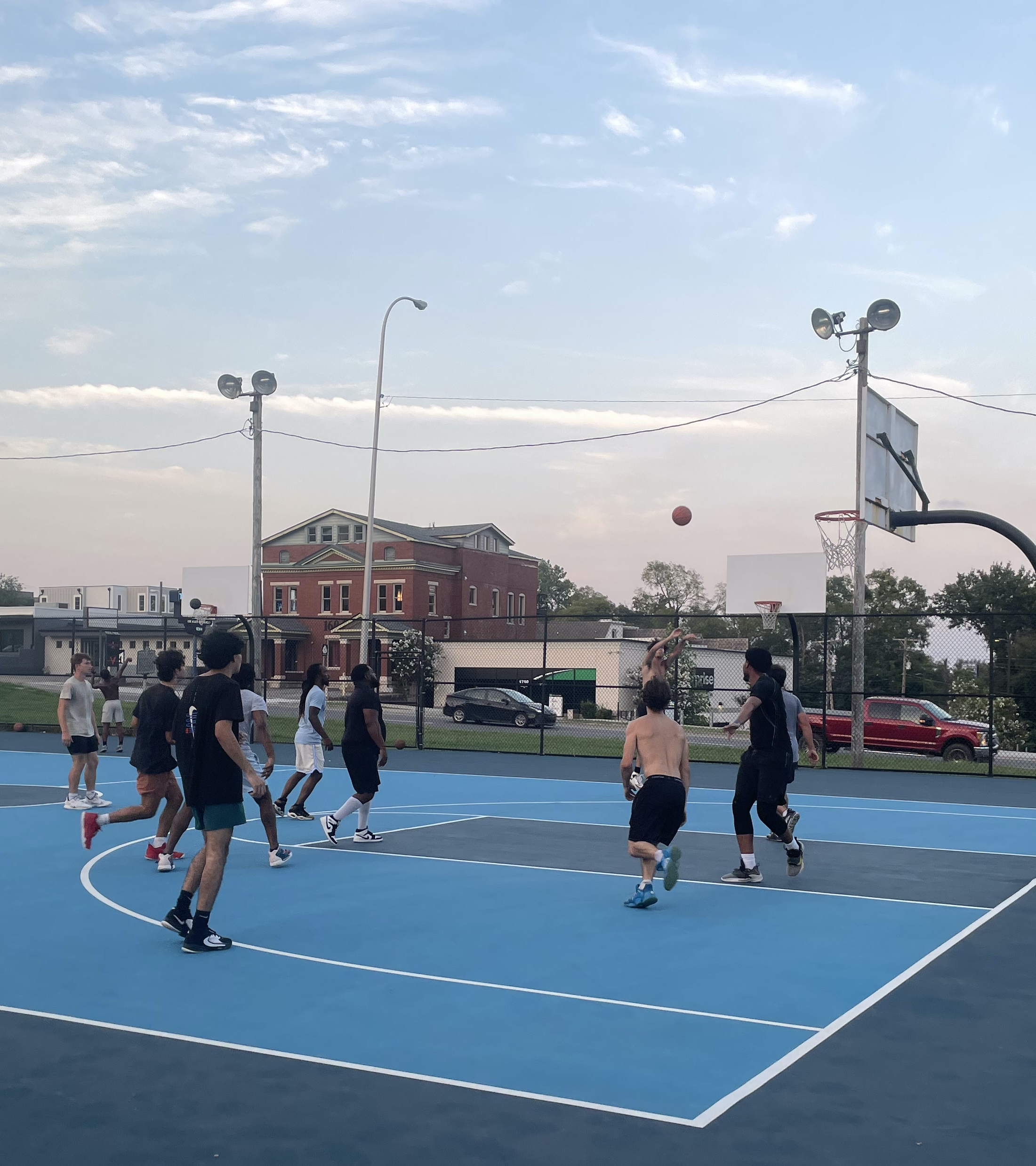
A 5v5 pick-up game in Nashville, Tennessee

To participate in most pick-up games around the world, one simply goes to an outdoor court where people are playing, indicates a wish to participate. Different courts have differing rules in regards to player selection, including selection through team captains, spontaneous team formation, arrival time, or meritocracy (via free-throws).

Once teams and court (half or full) have been decided upon, three key rule sets need to be agreed upon: (1) scoring increments (2) winning score (3) stopping rule.

Typical scoring increments include:

- 1's only – each basket counts as 1 point
- 2's only – each basket counts as 2 points
- 1's and 2's – each basket counts as 1 point inside the arc and 2 points outside the arc
- 2's and 3's – each basket counts as 2 points inside the arc and 3 points outside the arc

Typical winning scores include:

- 7, 11, or 12 (when scoring by 1's or 1's and 2's)
- 15, 18, or 21 (when scoring by 2's and 3's)

Typical stopping rules:

- "straight up" meaning that the first team to reach the winning score wins
- "win by two" requiring the winning team to both reach the winning score and exceed the other teams score by two or more points.

Given these three essential rules, pickup games typically are started by a recitation of the three in a single sentence, echoed by the opposing team captains. Such phrases typically take the form of "1's and 2's, to 21, straight up?" followed by either agreement or debate with the other team and teammates. Once terms have been agreed upon the game can commence.

The pick-up game can be played at different team formats such as 1-on-1, 2-on-2, or 3-on-3 for a half court play, while 4-on-4 or 5-on-5 typically require a full court play. In most instances, the winning team gets first possession and usually choose which direction (which basket) they get to use.

Typical rule violations which are enforced include traveling, double-dribble, carrying, kicking, out of bounds, goaltending and backcourt violation.

== Variations ==
=== Half-court play ===
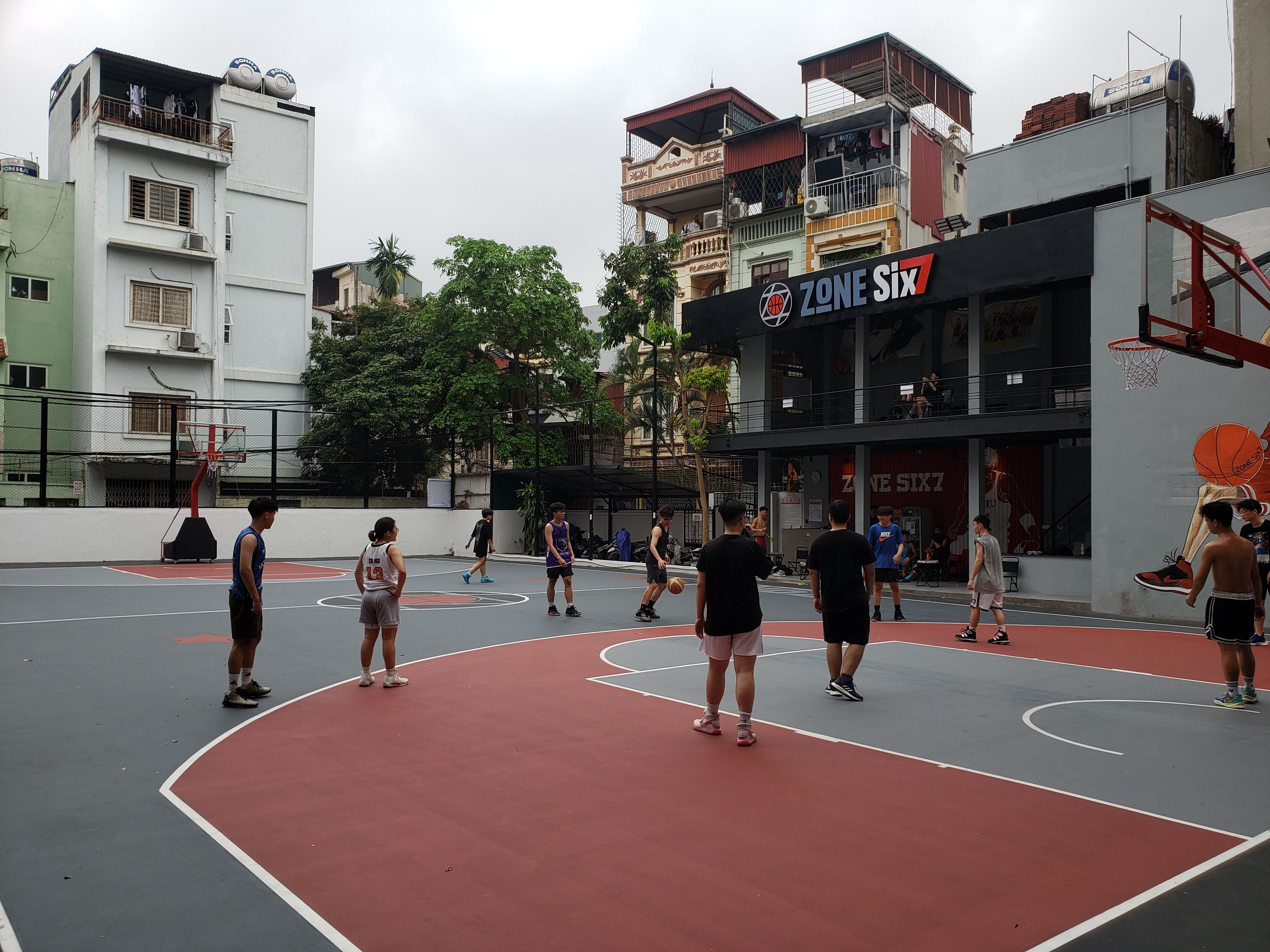
Pick-up game in Đống Đa, Hanoi

The majority of pick-up games with less than 8 total players are played on a half court. Special rules have been developed for half-court play:

- At the beginning of the game and after each made basket, play begins at the top of the key. A "checking" system is used to ensure that both teams are ready to begin play. This involves the offensive player saying "check" while throwing the ball to his defender. The defender then makes sure their team is ready and then throws the ball back to begin play.
- If the ball goes out of bounds during play, the ball can either be checked from out of bounds near where the ball went out or at the top of the key, depending on the rules established before the game.
- If the defending team gains possession of the ball, they must "clear" the ball past the three-point line before they can score a basket. This does not need to be at the top of the key and no checking is required.
- Sometimes in a half-court game, a "winner's ball" or "make it, take it" rule is used. This means that when a team scores, they get the ball back on offense. Potentially, the other team could end up never getting the ball on offense if the first team scores on every possession.
- Additionally, a 'pass-in' rule often applies to the start of play. This means that the ball must be passed before any of the offensive players can either initiate a drive, or shoot.
- Another rule is every one passes the ball relaying the pass before scoring in the game.(7)

=== One-on-one play ===
Special rules can be instituted for one-on-one play:

- Often in a one-on-one game, a "winner's ball" or "make it, take it" rule is used. In this case, if a player scores, they will get play offense again and the other player may never get the chance to play offense.
- One variation is the skunk rule, which states that if a player reaches a certain point without the other player scoring, the game is ends. The skunk rule limit can vary, but often ends a game at 7 to 0.
- A local dead end limit rule can be applied; for instance a game may be played to 7, win by 2, with a 9-point dead end, (refer to as 7 by 2's, 9 straight) which would mean scores of 7–3, 8–6, or 9–8 would all be final, while with scores of 7–6 or 8–7, play would continue.
- Sometimes the losing player of a one-on-one match is given a second chance for overtime. This either results with the match continuing or if the match is close enough the next person to go up by 2 points wins.
- On some courts close game of one-on-one cannot end on a bank shot. If a bank shot happens on the last point of the game, there is a replay of possession. (refer as the no bank shot rule)

=== 21 ===
A popular variation of pick-up basketball is 21, also known as Hustle, American, St. Mary's, V or Varsity, Roughhouse, 33, 50 or Crunch, or "New York." 21 is played most often with 3–5 players on a half court. However it is possible to play "21" with only two players or more.

Further, in some forms, players can freely enter the game after it has begun, starting at zero points or being "spotted" the same number as the player with the lowest score. "21" is an "every player for himself" game, with highly variable rules. The rules of "21" are usually agreed by the players at the beginning of the game.

The typical rules of "21" are:

- one player "breaks" to begin the game by shooting from 3 point range. Sometimes players agree that the "break" must not be a successful shot, in order to give every player an equal chance at rebounding to gain the 1st possession of the game
- the normal foul rule is in effect
- baskets are scored as 2 points (short/med range) and 3 points (long range)
- after a successful shot, the shooter can take up to three 1-point free-throws (or play the "shoot til you miss" rule, where the shooter continues to shoot the ball until a player misses), but as soon as he misses, the ball may be rebounded by anyone; conversely, if he makes all three free throw shots, he then gets to keep the ball and "check up" or start play again at the top of the arc
- In some games, 1 point free throws start at the charity stripe and then move to the 3 point line at the score of 11 and so on. (referred as the "long all day" rule)
- the last person with a shot attempt should be the first person to step out on defense
- after any change of possession, the ball should be cleared past the 3 point line (or at times just out of the key)
- in order to win, a player must make exactly 21 points; if he goes over then he restarts back at either 11, 13 or 15 points, depending on the rules in use
- whoever wins the game starts with the ball at the beginning of the next game
- only serious fouls are called (commonly referred to as "No blood, No foul")
- other typical basketball rules, such as out-of-bounds, are also frequently ignored in the game "21"; this is to avoid confusion on possession of the ball

Common additional rules include:

- if a missed shot is tipped in to the basket by another player without their feet touching the ground, then the shooter's score reverts to 0 (or 13, if their score was over 13); this rule may not apply on free-throws. (This is referred to as playing with "tips" or "taps")
- if a player who has 13 points misses their next shot, regardless of whether it is a free-throw, then their points revert to 0. (This is referred to as poison points)
- whoever wins the game must shoot a three-pointer in order to start with the ball at the beginning of the next game; if he makes it, he gets the three points, but doesn't have to take free-throws, and starts with the ball.
- players with less than 13 points at the end of a game keep their points into the next game using the (handicap system) for when there is a wide variation in skill amongst the players.

"21" is considered a very challenging game, especially because the offensive player must possibly go up against several defenders at the same time. For this reason, it is exceedingly difficult to "drive to the hole" and make lay-ups in "21." Therefore, and also because of the emphasis on free-throws, "21" is very much a shooter's game, and because a successful shot means you keep the ball, it is possible for there to be come-backs when a player recovers from a large deficit by not missing any shots (this can also result in failure when they miss their final free-throw at 20 points and revert to 13 or 15). "21" is popular because it allows an odd number of people to play, unlike regular basketball or other variants.

=== King of the Court ===
King of the Court is a variation of pick-up played by three more players. Play proceeds as a series of rotating 1v1 possessions on a half court.

Typical Game Structure:

Two players begin, with one on offense and the other on defence, while the 3rd through Nth watch. The game proceeds one possession at a time, with a player rotation occurring at the end of every possession.

If the offensive player scores, he remains on the court for another possession of offense, while the defender is rotated off and a new defender arrives for the next possession.

If the offensive player does not score with their possession, they are rotated off. The defender will then switch to offense for the following possession, and a new defender will be roated on.

If a defensive foul occurs during the possession, the possession starts over without a rotation. If an offensive foul is committed, the offensive player is rotated off regardless of the outcome of the play.

Play continues until a score stop has been met. This typically is preset at 12 (if playing by 1's or 1's and 2's) or 21 (if playing by 2's and 3's)

=== H-O-R-S-E ===
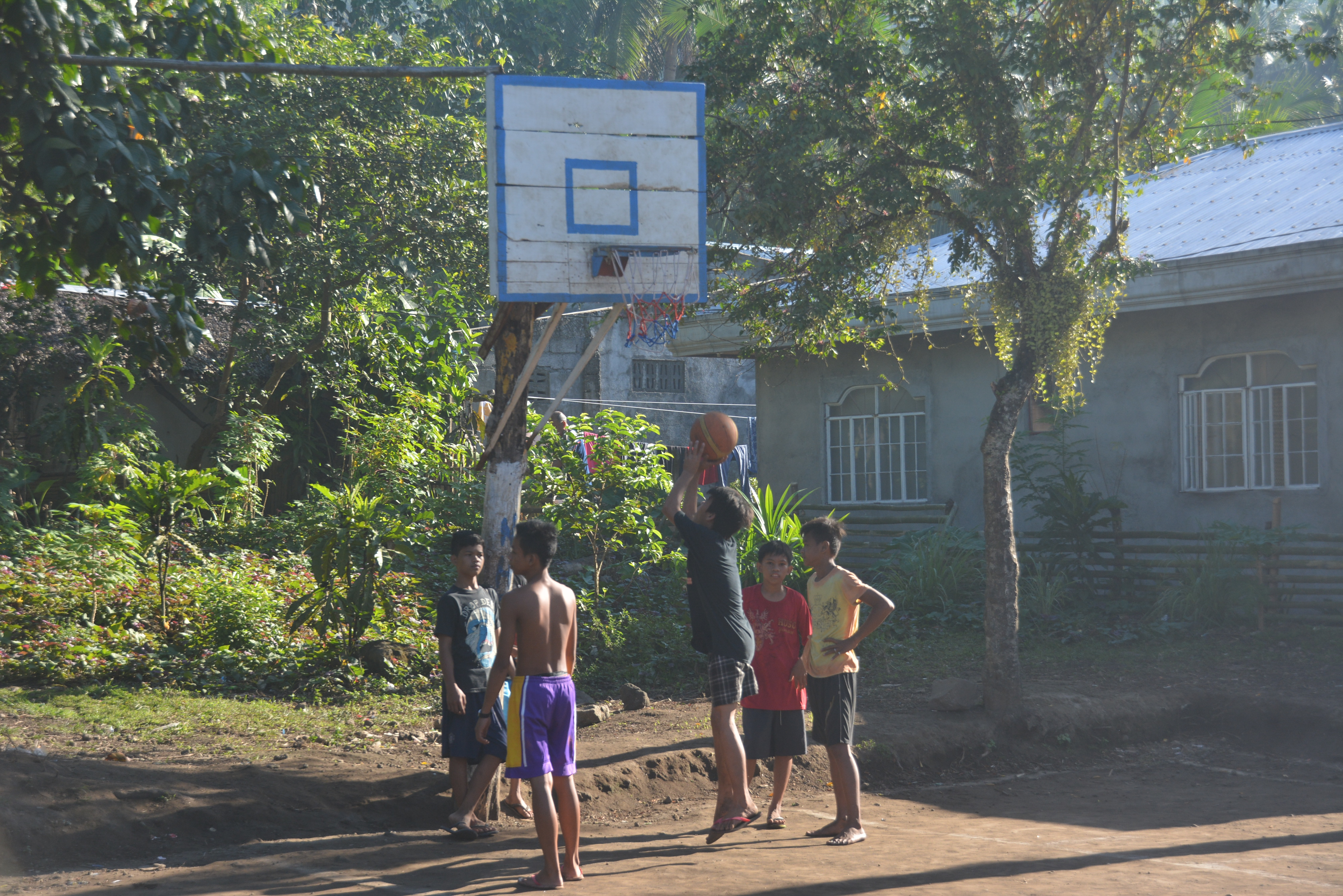
Children playing pick-up in Iriga, Philippines

The game of H-O-R-S-E (and its shorter alternative P-I-G) is played by two or more players. The order of turns is established before the game starts. The player whose turn is first is given control, which means they must attempt to make a basket in a particular way of their choosing, explaining to the other players beforehand what the requirements of the shot are. If that player is successful, every subsequent player must attempt that same shot according to its requirements. If a player fails to duplicate the shot, they acquire a letter, starting with H and moving rightward through the word "Horse". After all players have made an attempt, control moves to the next player, and the game continues on in this fashion. If a player who has control misses their shot, there is no letter penalty and control moves to the next player. Whenever any player has all of the letters, they are eliminated from the game. The last person in the game is declared the winner.
