= History of sport in China =

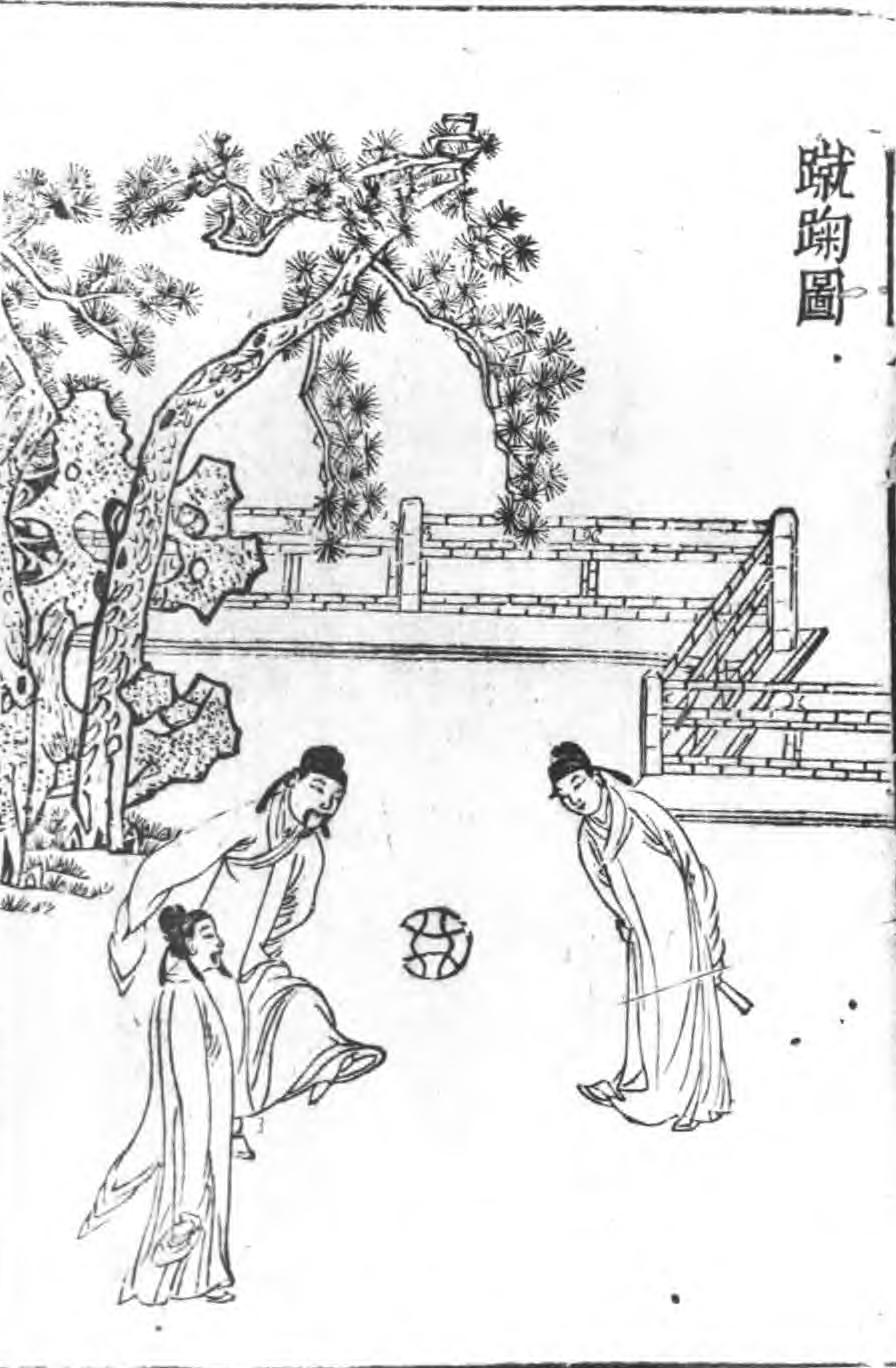
Cuju, an ancient Chinese predecessor to association football

China has several millennia-old native sports, with Western sports having arrived by the 19th century.

== Ancient era ==
The need for military preparation influenced the sports and physical activities of ancient China. A number of unique traditions developed throughout this period such as dragon boat racing and martial arts.

The Song dynasty saw greater affluence in society affect sports, with competitiveness devalued and street performances and leisure becoming more prominent aspects of the culture.

== Modern era ==
Western physical culture was brought into 19th-century Qing China with an initial element of Western military force backing its entry, and was introduced in the form of military drills, Western-style schooling, and Christian missionary influences by organizations such as the YMCA. The shock from the encounter with the West forced Chinese academics to debate the way in which the Western ideas surrounding physical culture should be adopted into Chinese society, with some calling for the end of "moribund" Chinese traditions. By the second half of the century, sport became part of the national Self-Strengthening Movement, and by the early 20th century, Western sport had become more generally accepted as part of modernizing China. Western norms around sport contrasted with the native culture to a significant extent, encouraging a greater level of competitiveness.

Contact with Westerners in the treaty ports shaped early encounters with Western sports. In Taiwan, the Treaty of Tientsin opened the border to the Western countries, and many missionaries came to Taiwan for missionary, medical, and education work. The missionaries aimed to increase intelligence, morality, and physical fitness, and started to include physical education classes in the system. Sports like gymnastics, racing, high jump, and hiking were introduced.

Rising nationalism in China by the early 20th century saw sport become a tool for strengthening national solidarity. In the aftermath of World War I, there was also a greater interest in improving international relations, with the YMCA helping to develop China's sporting ecosystem in this direction; the YMCA itself was also affected by the lessons it learned from its Christianization efforts and cross-cultural encounter in China.

== Contemporary era ==
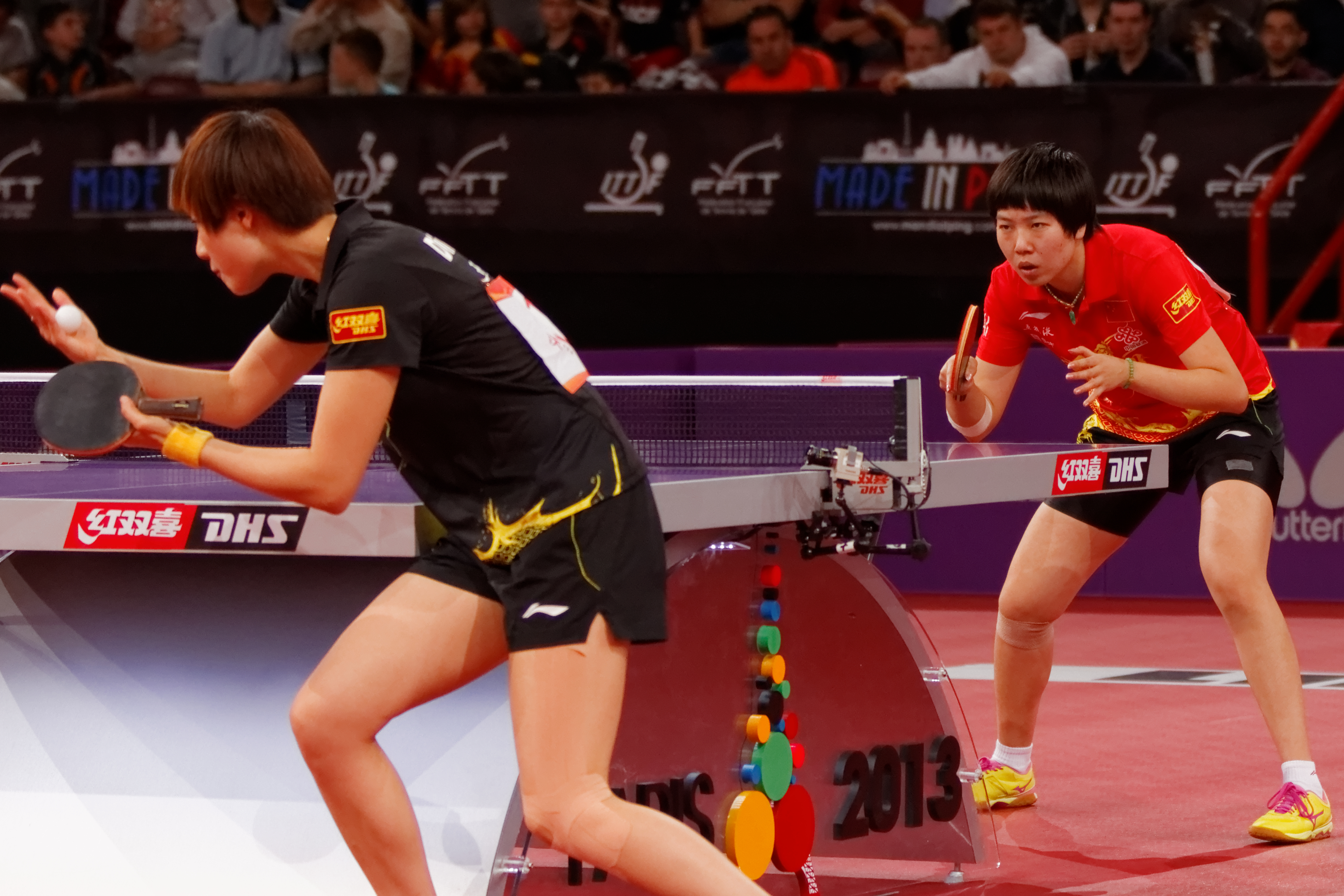
Table tennis is popular in China, and is of British origin

The 1949 establishment of the People's Republic of China (PRC) saw a strong desire to combat the challenges of the previous century. In this context, the government began heavily promoting and organizing sports. In the rural context, sport was also part of the modernization agenda, and was initially seen in a context of increasing agricultural productivity and national defense.

Before the 1980s, the country's international sports success was mainly in table tennis. In the 1970s, the sport helped to defuse Cold War tensions with the United States through ping-pong diplomacy. Other sports then began to emerge with the 1981 FIVB Volleyball Women's World Cup where the Chinese team won the gold medal amid enormous public attention.

Prior to the 1990s, sports were entirely funded by the government. In 1994, Chinese association football was professionalized, followed by basketball, volleyball, ping pong, and weiqi. Professionalization led to commercialization; this meant that sports associations became profit-making entities and that a club system and professional sports leagues were formed. Chinese athletes have also begun joining professional leagues abroad, such as basketball player Yao Ming's entry into the United States' NBA in the 2002 draft.

In September 2007, the Yao Ming and Yi Jianlian basketball matchup drew China's largest audience ever for a single sports game as 100–200 million Chinese watched live. China Daily reported that Virtually the whole nation stands glued to their television sets, amid parties and wild celebrations.

China led the gold medal count (48) at the 2008 Summer Olympics in Beijing. China hosted the 2014 Summer Youth Olympics from August 16 to 28, 2014.

In 2017, a football match in the Tianhe Stadium in Guangzhou drew the largest audience for a single sporting event within the boundaries of mainland China.

== Government policy ==
=== Mao’s policy that emphasizes sports ===
During the Mao Zedong era of the People’s Republic of China (1949 to 1976), sports were first seen as a militarized and socialist movement in which all men and women were required to take part. Mao felt it was imperative to build people’s health in order to maintain and defend the nation. Sports inspired a collective work effort that united the country in the spirit of socialism allowing women to gain greater equality. In 1952, at the June inaugural meeting of the All-China Sports Federation, he called on the Chinese people to “Develop physical culture and sport, and strengthen the physique of the people.” In 1953, during a speech on behalf of the Presidium of the Second National Congress of the New Democratic Youth League of China, Mao said: “Now we must make sure that everybody, including workers, peasants, soldiers, students and cadres, can keep fit. Of course, it does not necessarily mean that if you are in good health you will be good at study, for study must be done in the proper way… Now it is necessary to arrange some recreation for which there must be time and facilities, and this end should be firmly grasped too. The Party Central Committee has decided to cut down the number of meetings and study hours, and you must see to it that this decision is carried out. Challenge anyone who refuses to do so. In short, young people should be able to keep fit, study well and work well.”

=== Gender Equality Maoist Era ===
Chinese female athletes were able to step into the role of the “woman warrior,” a figure that won glory for the nation during the Maoist period. This figure of the female warriors (wudan) has existed down the centuries and is a stock character in martial arts novels (wuxia xiaoshuo) and other literary texts, and operas (wuxi). Rural women were at the forefront of this movement due to their predisposition in the countryside bringing them towards sports. This is due to Chinese sport typically being associated with lower class individuals, especially peasants, in the historically hierarchical male dominated society. Secondly, the very nature of peasant labor requires a strong physique and mental toughness, typically associated with rural women during the Cultural Revolution. Through Mao’s movement, women gained respect across the country but still fought for the rights to full equality. Lou Dapeng, Vice-President of the Chinese Track and Field association, is reported as saying that “It has been our policy to concentrate on women's sports.” The swimming Coach Chen Yungpeng also said that “the outstanding achievements made by female athletes… have encouraged Chinese sports authorities to channel more funds and manpower to women's events than to men's, resulting in wider participation and higher technical standards among women.”

=== National fitness post Maoist Era ===
The "Physical Health Law of the People's Republic of China" was adopted in 1995. In the same year, the State Council promulgated the "Outline of Nationwide Physical Fitness Program", followed by a series of rules and regulations. A survey released by the State Physical Culture Administration indicates that at present 33.9% of the population between 7 and 70 exercise regularly and 60.7% of the urban population go to sports clubs to engage in fitness activities. It is expected that by the end of 2005, 37% of China's total population will participate in regular physical exercises, and that over 95% of students will meet the National Physical Exercise Standard. Aiming to improve the health and the overall physical condition of the general population, the Nationwide Physical Fitness Program, with an emphasis on young people and children, encourages everyone to engage in at least one sporting activity every day, learn at least two ways of keeping fit and have a health examination every year.

In this 15-year-long program, the government aims to build a sport and health-building service system for the general public. There are about 620,000 gymnasiums and stadiums across China, open to and widely used by the public. Outdoor fitness centers have been installed in urban communities in public parks, squares, schoolyards, and other convenient locations. All communities and neighborhoods in Beijing are equipped with fitness facilities that meet the national standard. Building on what it already had, Tianjin has instituted large-scale expansion of its outdoor and indoor fitness facilities and stadiums. 2004 saw the completion of China's first large fitness arena with a floor area in excess of 10,000 m^{2}.

Starting in 2001, the State Physical Culture Administration has set aside the proceeds of the sports lottery as pilot funds, in order to build "China Sports Lottery Nationwide Physical Fitness Centers" as pilot projects in 31 large and medium-sized cities throughout the country, including Dalian, Beijing and Changchun. Some of these centers have already been built. Meanwhile, some 196 million yuan of sports lottery proceeds were used to construct public sporting facilities in China's less-developed western areas and in the Three Gorges region of the Yangtze River, supporting 101 counties and towns.

== Modern overview ==
The introduction of the competitiveness and ideas of fair play present in the Western physical culture into China is argued to have served as a foundation for modern global capitalism in the country, as well as a transition enforced by the Chinese government to a more militaristic Chinese nation-state. Sporting excellence has been pursued in events such as the Olympics as a way to unify China and present its rise on the world stage. In this context, Beijing's hosting of the 2008 Summer Olympics and the 2022 Winter Olympics showcased China's overall development.
