= Twenty-one (basketball) =

Street basketball variation

Twenty-one, also called play21basketball, cutthroat, hustle, tip-it, noyceball, roughhouse, scutter, rough, or rebound is a popular variation of street basketball. The game is played with any number of players on a half court, but typically when not enough players are available to at least play three-on-three. Twenty-one is an individual game that does not utilize team play.

== Rules ==
The rules and game play may vary regionally, locally, and even by specific court.

Basic rules are as follows:

Typically play begins with one player shooting the ball from a significant distance. This shot must hit the rim, but cannot go through the basket. If either of these violations occur, the ball must be re-shot. Once the ball is legally shot, all players then fight over the rebound. This is meant to mimic the "tip-off" of a standard game. Once the ball is in play, there are technically no rules, but due to peer pressure most players abide by all rules with the exception of out of bounds violations and personal fouls.

Shots made after the ball is live count two points for a player's score (or three points if a 3-pointer is made). After each made field goal, the player making the field goal shoots up to three free throws in a row, until he misses. All free throws count as one point towards a player's count. If three free throws are made in a row, the free throw shooter is handed the ball back at the top of the key and play is live again.

The game is won by the player who accumulates exactly 21 points. If a player goes over 21 points, his score is reduced to 11 points. To avoid going over 21, players may choose to miss a free throw intentionally. In this instance, a free throw must hit the rim to be legal. If it does not, the player must shoot again. Sometimes this results in the player accidentally making the shot.

=== Variations ===
Common additional rule(s) include:

- Allowing the starting shot to score points for the shooter if it goes in
- If a player is shooting for the win and misses, their score is reduced to 15.
- Inverting scoring values such that a field goal is worth 1 and a free throw worth 2
- The shot must be a top shot/ a shot that is scored when the ball is shot over your eyeline
- Forcing a player to take a fourth free throw and intentionally miss if he has made all 3 free throws, instead of just returning the ball to him
- A player can attempt a 3-pointer instead of attempting three free throws
- Variations on what a score is reset to if 21 is exceeded (7, 10, 11, 13, and 15 are common)
- "Wotring Rule" "Taps" or "Tips" : With these rules, if a player jumps up, gets a rebound in the air and makes a shot before touching the ground, the player who initially shot the ball is said to have been "tapped," or "tipped,". This can result in their score being reset to zero or 11, or the tapper "stealing" 5 points from shooter. In some games, if a player gets tapped 3 times, or if their score is already zero, they are out of the game. In another variation, if a player is tapped using only one hand, they are immediately eliminated. Once eliminated, a player can only return to the game by catching an airball of a player currently in the game.
- If three-pointers are used instead of free-throws and the player is on 20 and shooting for the win, the player must make an extra long three-pointer to win the game. (This type of finishing is used with experienced players and even then causes the game to last a prolonged time.)
- If a player who has 11 points misses the next shot, regardless of whether it is a free throw, then that player's points revert to 0. This is referred to as "poison points".
- Players with fewer than 11 points at the end of a game keep their points into the next game (a sort of handicapping system for when there is a wide variation in skill between the players).
- After exactly 21 points are reached, the player must make a final 3-pointer.
- When a player makes his 21st point and is playing with "tips" or "taps" the shooter must miss his free throw but also hit the rim. This gives the other players a chance to spoil the win and steal points from the shooter.
- If the game was started without a traditional jump ball, then the player (s) who did not receive the ball first receive 1 chance to even the game
- "Breaking the ice" : There is no penalty for going over 21, but if a player scores 21 or more with a two or three-point shot, the player must first hit a free throw successfully. If he does so, he then shoots a 3-pointer to win the game. If he misses the free throw, he does not lose any points, and the game continues. If he makes the free throw but misses the 3-pointer, his score is reset to a lower value (e.g. 13, as above) and the game continues.
- “Kobe 24/8 Rule” : After the death of basketball legend, Kobe Bryant, the basketball community on Twitter rallied support around a variation in honor of Kobe. The game is played to 24 and the score is reset to 8 if a player exceeds 24. During his NBA career Kobe wore jersey numbers 8 and 24.
- Players on 19, shooting at the foul line, must hit rim or be forced back to 11. (This prevents a player on 19 from simply slamming the ball off the backboard to himself, thereby regaining possession without having to rebound normally.
- If the score is tied at 19, one of the tied players must first reach 21, then score 2 additional points to win. Once you get to 21 you shoot one free throw to win or go back down to 11.

== Formal use ==
Twenty-one is frequently used in physical education classes and by basketball team coaches as skill development. Because only one player is on offense at any given time against several defenders, quickness and shooting skills are essential to successful play.

== See also ==
- Variations of basketball
