= Traditional games of China =

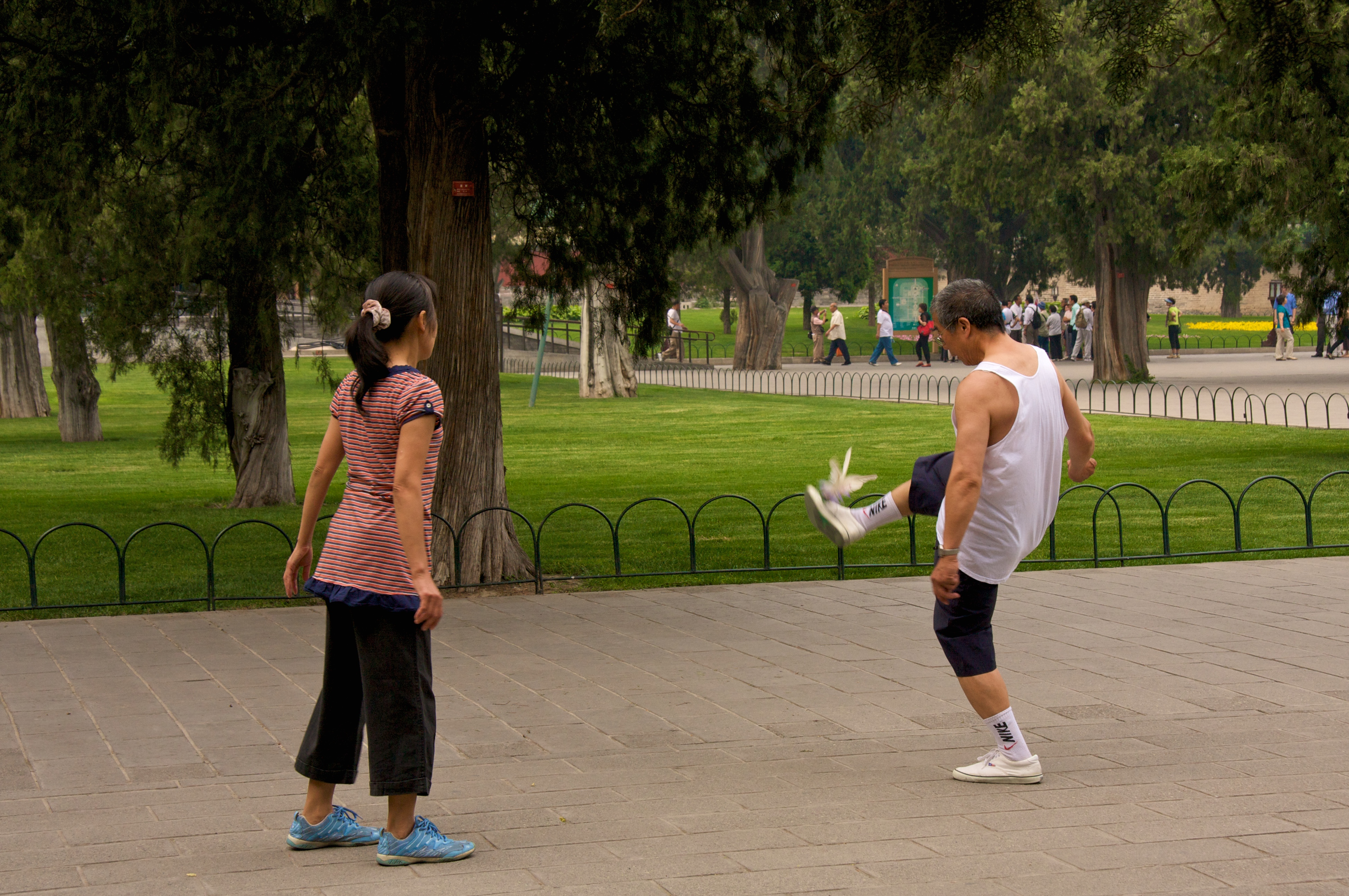
The player on the right attempts to kick the shuttlecock upwards in a game of jianzi.

China has a long history of traditional games, sports, and physical activities.

== Extinct games ==
=== Chuiwan ===
Chuiwan was an ancient Chinese game that can be considered an early form of golf.

=== Cuju ===
Cuju was an ancient Chinese game that is similar to association football.

== Traditional games ==
=== Jianzi ===
In jianzi, players attempt to keep a shuttlecock from falling to the ground by hitting it with any part of their bodies other than their hands.

=== Pitch-pot ===
In pitch-pot (also known as Touhu), players attempt to throw arrows in to a pot with a narrow mouth. The game is explained in the Book of Rites, one of the Five Confucian Classics. Pitch-pot traditionally was governed by many rules of etiquette, as explained in the Book of Rites, though nowadays the game has more informal versions (mostly online though).

=== Flower Stick ===
In flower stick, players perform various tricks using a flower stick, which is a unique Chinese cultural activity.

== Variations of tag ==
=== Chicken vs eagle ===
In this game, one player is the eagle, another player is the chicken, and the remaining players are chicks. The chicks form a line behind the chicken by holding each other's waists, and the goal of the eagle is to tag the chicks, while the chicken tries to prevent this by holding their arms out and moving around. Throughout the game, the chicks must stay in the line formation, and if one of them is tagged, then they become the eagle.

=== Catch the dragon's tail ===
All the players line up by holding each other's waists, with the player in the front known as the "dragon", and the player in the back known as the "tail". The goal of the dragon is to tag the tail, while all other players aim to prevent this by moving around. The players must stay in the line formation throughout the game, and once the dragon tags the tail, the players all move up one spot, with the former dragon now at the back of the line.

=== Cat and mouse ===
All but two of the players form a circle around a player called the "mouse", with one player known as the "cat" staying outside of the circle. The encircling players rotate around the mouse for a certain amount of time, and once they stop, the cat tries to tag the mouse while both players run in and out of the circle, though the cat has to follow the exact path taken by the mouse.

== Board games ==
=== Go ===
Go is a board game in which players attempt to surround their opponents' pieces on the board with their own pieces in order to "capture" the opponents' pieces. The player that captures the most overall territory on the board wins the game.

=== Xiangqi ===
Xiangqi is a board game with similarities to chess.

== Gambling games ==
=== Pai gow ===
Pai gow is a gambling game played with dominoes, in which the goal is to get four tiles with numbers that add up to nine or more.

== Boat racing ==
=== Dragon boat ===
Dragon boat racing is over 2,000 years old, with either 10 or 20 participants trying to row the dragon boat as fast as possible.

== Minority games ==
These games are played only by certain minority groups (ethnic or regional) in China.

=== Pearl ball ===
Pearl ball is a Manchu game which is similar to basketball. Six players from each team compete on a 28x15m court, with the goal of the offense being to shoot the ball into a small net held by one of their teammates, while some of the defenders have paddles they can use to deflect the ball away from the net.

== See also ==
- Traditional games of South Asia
