= List of New Orleans Pelicans head coaches =

The New Orleans Pelicans are an American professional basketball team based in New Orleans. They play in the Southwest Division of the Western Conference in the National Basketball Association (NBA).

== History ==
The team was born out of the original Hornets' relocation to New Orleans in 2002. The team has had three names since its inception; it was called the New Orleans Hornets (2002–2005; 2007–2013), the New Orleans / Oklahoma City Hornets (2005–2007), and the New Orleans Pelicans (2013–present). The Pelicans have never been to the NBA Finals since its inception. The team has played their home games at the Smoothie King Center(formerly the New Orleans Arena) since 2002. The Pelicans are owned by Gayle Benson, with Trajan Langdon as their general manager.

== Coaches ==
There have been seven head coaches for the Pelicans. The franchise's first head coach was Paul Silas, who coached for one season. Byron Scott is the franchise's all-time leader for the most regular-season games coached (419), the most regular-season game wins (203), the most playoff games coached (17), and the most playoff-game wins (8). Paul Silas has franchise record for the highest winning percentage in the regular season (.573). Scott is the only Pelicans coach to have won the NBA Coach of the Year Award, having won it in the 2007–08 season. Bower's only head coaching job was with the Pelicans. No Pelicans head coach has been elected into the Basketball Hall of Fame as a coach. The Pelicans' fifth head coach was Monty Williams, who was appointed on June 7, 2010.

On June 16, 2021, the Pelicans mutually parted ways with Stan Van Gundy who coached the team for one season.

== Statistics ==
=== Key ===
GC	Games coached
W	Wins
L	Losses
Win%	Winning percentage
#	Number of coaches^{[a]}
*	Spent entire NBA head coaching career with the Hornets / Pelicans

Note: Statistics are correct through the end of the 2025–26 season.

#	Name	Term^{[b]}	GC	W	L	Win%	GC	W	L	Win%	Achievements	Reference
#	Name	Term^{[b]}	Regular season				Playoffs				Achievements	Reference
New Orleans Hornets
1	Paul Silas	2002–2003	82	47	35	.573	6	2	4	.333		
2	Tim Floyd	2003–2004	82	41	41	.500	7	3	4	.429		
3	Byron Scott	2004–2009	419	203	216	.484	17	8	9	.471	2007–08 NBA Coach of the Year	
4	Jeff Bower*	2009–2010	73	34	39	.466	—	—	—	—		
5	Monty Williams	2010–2013	230	94	136	.409	6	2	4	.333		
New Orleans Pelicans
—	Monty Williams	2013–2015	164	79	85	.482	4	0	4	.000		
6	Alvin Gentry	2015–2020	400	175	225	.438	9	5	4	.556		
7	Stan Van Gundy	2020–2021	72	31	41	.431	—	—	—	—		
8	Willie Green*	2021–2025	340	150	190	.441	10	2	8	.200		
9	James Borrego	2026	70	24	46	.343	0	0	0	–		
10	Jamahl Mosley	2026–present	—	—	—	–	—	—	—	–		

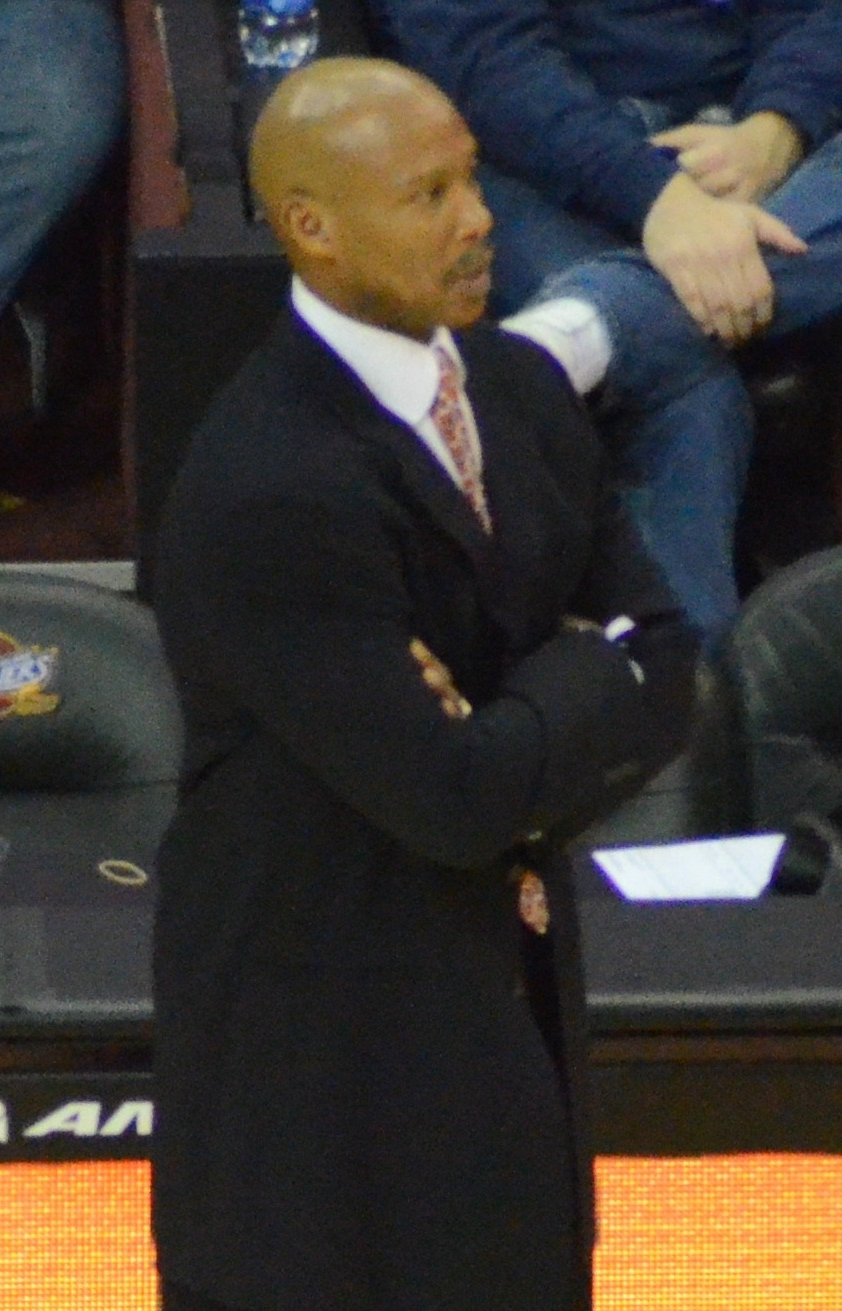
Byron Scott was the head coach of the Hornets from 2004 to 2009.

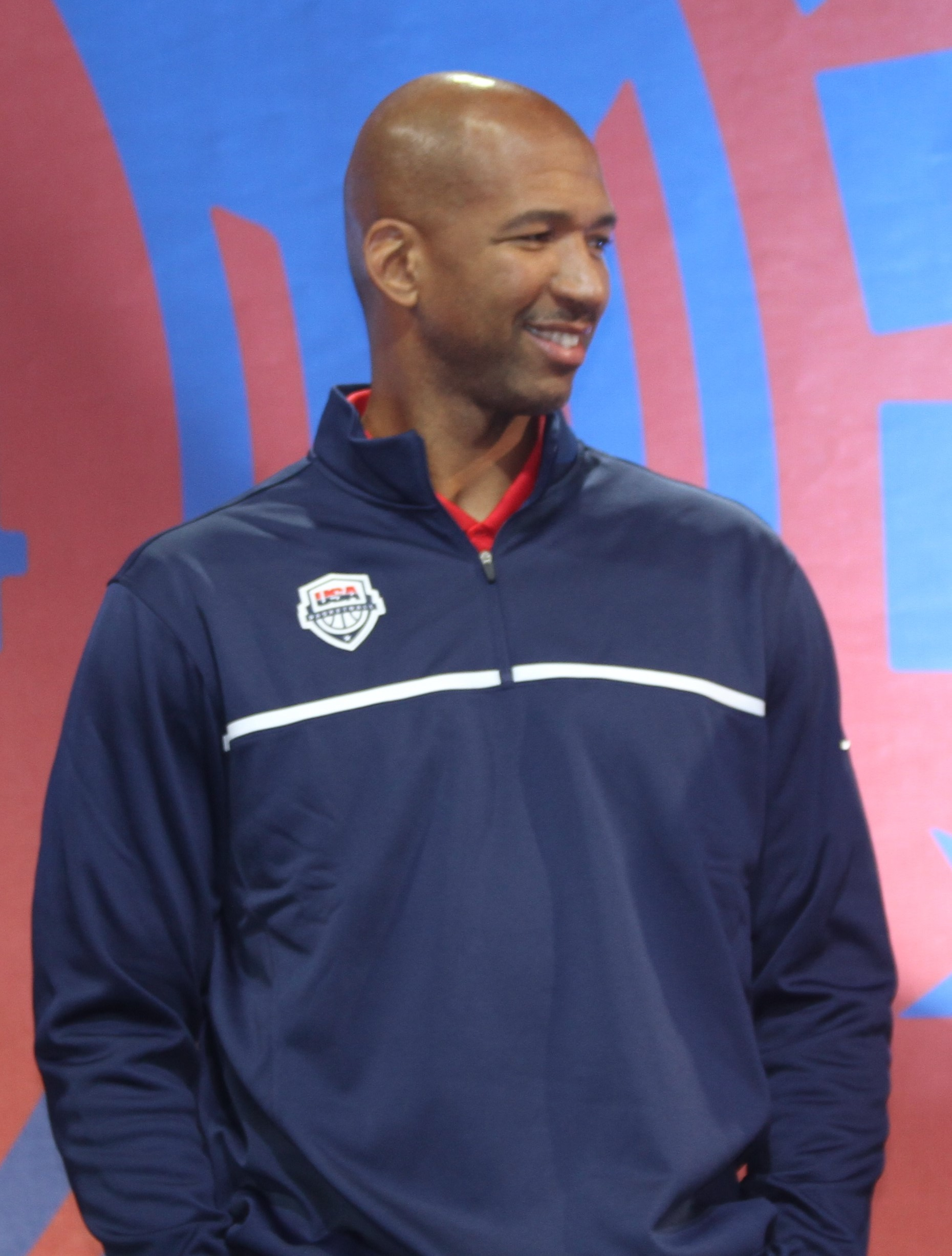
Monty Williams was the head coach of the Hornets/Pelicans from 2010 to 2015.

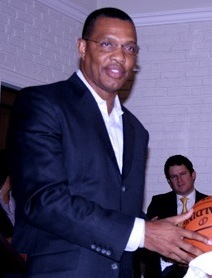
Alvin Gentry was the head coach of the Pelicans from 2015 to 2020.

== Notes ==
- ^{a} A running total of the number of coaches of the Hornets/Pelicans. Thus, any coach who has two or more separate terms as head coach is only counted once.
- ^{b} Each year is linked to an article about that particular NBA season.
