= Kenny Atkinson =

American basketball coach (born 1967)

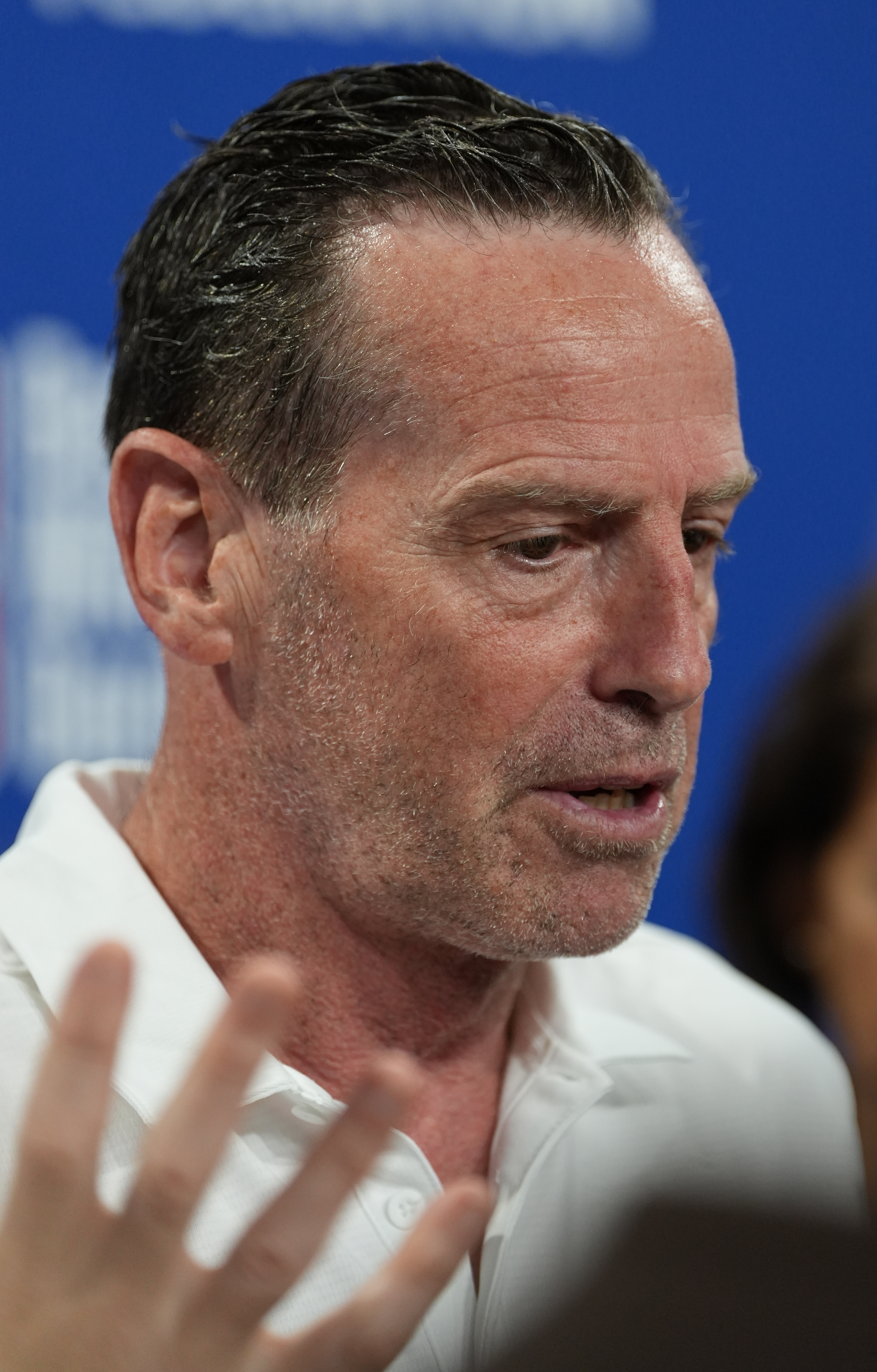
- Atkinson in 2026

Cleveland Cavaliers
- Title: Head coach
- League: NBA

Personal information
- Born: June 2, 1967 (age 59) Northport, New York, U.S.
- Listed height: 6 ft 1 in (1.85 m)
- Listed weight: 185 lb (84 kg)

Career information
- High school: St. Anthony's (South Huntington, New York)
- College: Richmond (1986–1990)
- NBA draft: 1990: undrafted
- Playing career: 1990–2004
- Position: Point guard
- Coaching career: 2004–present

Career history

Playing
- 1990–1991: Wichita Falls Texans
- 1991: Long Island Surf
- 1991–1992: Wichita Falls Texans
- 1993–1995: Real Canoe NC
- 1995: Vino de Toro Zamora
- 1995–1996: Baloncesto Salamanca
- 1996–1997: Calpe Aguas de Valencia
- 1997–1998: Pasta Baronia Napoli
- 1998–1999: SG Braunschweig
- 1999–2000: Montpellier Paillade Basket
- 2000–2001: AS Golbey Épinal
- 2001: FC Mulhouse Basket
- 2001–2002: Hermine de Nantes Atlantique
- 2002: ALM Évreux Basket
- 2003: DJK Würzburg
- 2003: Demon Astronauts
- 2003–2004: Hermine de Nantes Atlantique

Coaching
- 2004–2006: Paris Basket Racing (assistant)
- 2008–2012: New York Knicks (assistant)
- 2012–2016: Atlanta Hawks (assistant)
- 2016–2020: Brooklyn Nets
- 2020–2021: Los Angeles Clippers (assistant)
- 2021–2024: Golden State Warriors (assistant)
- 2024–present: Cleveland Cavaliers

Career highlights
- As assistant coach: NBA champion (2022); As head coach: NBA Coach of the Year (2025); NBCA Coach of the Year (2025); NBA All-Star Game head coach (2025)

Kenneth Neil Atkinson (born June 2, 1967) is an American professional basketball coach and former player who is the head coach for the Cleveland Cavaliers of the National Basketball Association (NBA). He was previously the head coach of the Brooklyn Nets from 2016 to 2020. Atkinson was born in Northport, New York and played college basketball for University of Richmond leading the Spiders team to an appearance in the 1988 NCAA Division I tournament.

== Playing career ==
Atkinson averaged 18.9 points per game during his senior season at Richmond and played professionally in the Continental Basketball Association (CBA) and United States Basketball League (USBL) from 1990 to 1992. He then went to play in Italy, France, Germany, Spain, and the Netherlands from 1993 to 2004. He had tryouts with several NBA teams, including the New York Knicks, in the summer of 1991.

He was inducted into the Suffolk Sports Hall of Fame in 2020.

== Coaching career ==
=== Assistant coaching (2004–2016) ===
Atkinson began his coaching career in 2004 as an assistant coach and director of player development for Paris Basket Racing. He held the same position with the Georgia men's national basketball team in the summer of 2006.

Atkinson was the director of player development for the Houston Rockets during the 2007-08 season. He joined the New York Knicks coaching staff as an assistant coach under Mike D'Antoni on August 6, 2008.

In 2012, he joined the Atlanta Hawks coaching staff under Larry Drew. He was retained by Drew's successor, Mike Budenholzer. On April 17, 2016, it was announced that Atkinson would become the head coach of the Brooklyn Nets, beginning after the Hawks' postseason ended.

=== Brooklyn Nets (2016–2020) ===
Atkinson made his NBA head coaching debut on October 26, 2016, in a 122–117 loss to the Boston Celtics. He got his first win as an NBA head coach two days later when the Nets defeated the Indiana Pacers 103–94. The Nets finished the season with a 20–62 record, with a 0–10 record in February 2017.

Brook Lopez left the team in Atkinson's second season; Lopez was traded to the Los Angeles Lakers in an off-season deal. The Nets were competitive for the early part of the season before going 1–9 in February, ending any chance to be in the playoffs. They finished the season with a 28–54 record, which was an eight-game improvement from the previous season.

In Atkinson's third season with the Nets he led the team to a 42–40 record, winning 14 games more than the previous season, and a playoff berth with the sixth seed. The Nets lost to the Philadelphia 76ers in five games in the first round of the playoffs.

In Atkinson's fourth season with the Nets he led the team to a 28–34 record, before stepping down as head coach on March 7, 2020.

=== Los Angeles Clippers (2020–2021) ===
On November 16, 2020, Atkinson was hired as an assistant coach for the Los Angeles Clippers under head coach Tyronn Lue.

=== Golden State Warriors (2021–2024) ===
On August 13, 2021, the Golden State Warriors hired Atkinson as an assistant coach. He won his first NBA championship as the Warriors defeated the Boston Celtics in six games in the 2022 NBA Finals. During the NBA Finals, the Charlotte Hornets offered Atkinson the position of head coach, but he reportedly turned it down after informally agreeing to take the job. On February 12, 2024, Atkinson coached the Warriors to a 129–107 victory against the Utah Jazz while head coach Steve Kerr attended Dejan Milojević's funeral in Serbia.

=== Cleveland Cavaliers (2024–present) ===
On June 28, 2024, Atkinson was hired by the Cleveland Cavaliers as head coach. The Cavaliers started the 2024–25 season with one of the longest winning streaks in NBA history, winning their first 15 games, which made Atkinson the only head coach in NBA history to win the first 15 games to start a tenure with a franchise, as Cleveland would not suffer their first loss until November 19 on the road against the defending champion, the Boston Celtics.

In April 2025, Atkinson won the NBCA Coach of the Year Award after he led the Cavaliers to a 64–18 record during the regular season. On May 5, he was named NBA Coach of the Year.

== Head coaching record ==
Legend
Regular season	G	Games coached	W	Games won	L	Games lost	W–L %	Win–loss %
Playoffs	PG	Playoff games	PW	Playoff wins	PL	Playoff losses	PW–L %	Playoff win–loss %

Team	Year	G	W	L	W–L%	Finish	PG	PW	PL	PW–L%	Result
Brooklyn	2016–17	82	20	62	.244	5th in Atlantic	—	—	—	—	Missed playoffs
Brooklyn	2017–18	82	28	54	.341	5th in Atlantic	—	—	—	—	Missed playoffs
Brooklyn	2018–19	82	42	40	.512	4th in Atlantic	5	1	4	.200	Lost in first round
Brooklyn	2019–20	62	28	34	.452	(resigned)	—	—	—	—	—
Cleveland	2024–25	82	64	18	.780	1st in Central	9	5	4	.556	Lost in conference semifinals
Cleveland	2025–26	82	52	30	.634	2nd in Central	18	8	10	.444	Lost in conference finals
Career		472	234	238	.496		32	14	18	.438	
