= NBCA Coach of the Year Award =

American professional basketball award

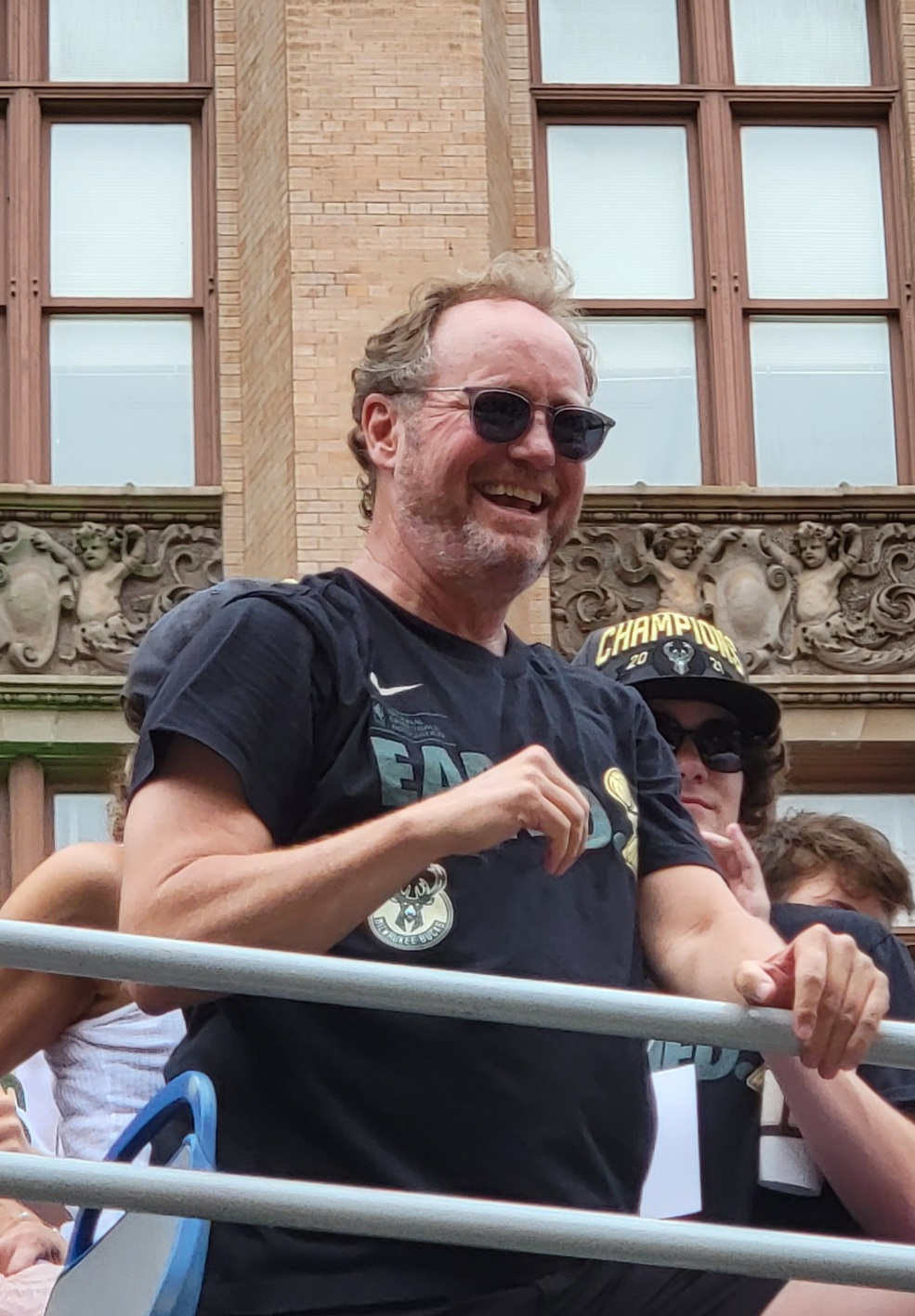
Two time winner; Mike Budenholzer

The Michael H. Goldberg NBCA Coach of the Year Award is an annual award by the National Basketball Coaches Association. First offered in 2017, the winners of the award are shown below.

NBCA Coach of the Year Award
Season	Winner	Team	W-L	W%	Ref
2016–17	Erik Spoelstra	Miami Heat	41–41	.500	
2016–17	Mike D'Antoni	Houston Rockets	55–27	.671	
2017–18	Dwane Casey	Toronto Raptors	59–23	.720	
2018–19	Mike Budenholzer	Milwaukee Bucks	60–22	.732	
2019–20	Mike Budenholzer (2)	Milwaukee Bucks (2)	56–17	.767	
2019–20	Billy Donovan	Oklahoma City Thunder	44–28	.611	
2020–21	Monty Williams	Phoenix Suns	51–21	.708	
2021–22	Monty Williams (2)	Phoenix Suns (2)	64–18	.780	
2022–23	Mike Brown	Sacramento Kings	48–34	.585	
2023–24	Mark Daigneault	Oklahoma City Thunder (2)	57–25	.695	
2024–25	Kenny Atkinson	Cleveland Cavaliers	64–18	.780	
2025–26	J. B. Bickerstaff	Detroit Pistons	60–22	.732	
