= Mike D'Antoni =

American-Italian basketball coach and former player (born 1951)

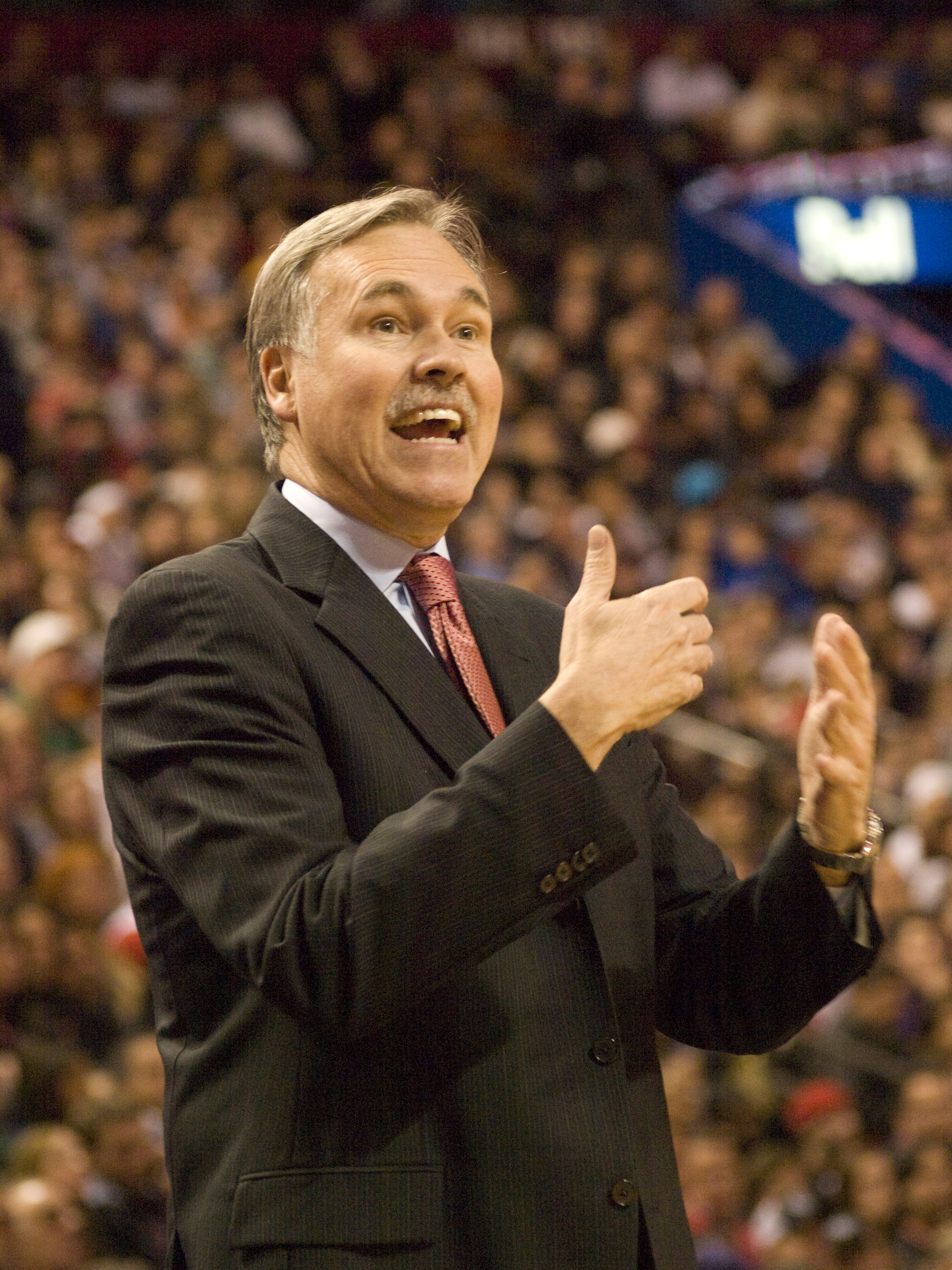
- D'Antoni coaching the New York Knicks in 2010

Personal information
- Born: May 8, 1951 (age 75) Mullens, West Virginia, U.S.
- Listed height: 6 ft 3 in (1.91 m)
- Listed weight: 185 lb (84 kg)

Career information
- High school: Mullens (Mullens, West Virginia)
- College: Marshall (1970–1973)
- NBA draft: 1973: 2nd round, 20th overall pick
- Drafted by: Kansas City-Omaha Kings
- Playing career: 1973–1990
- Position: Point guard
- Number: 5, 8, 10, 14
- Coaching career: 1990–present

Career history

Playing
- 1973–1975: Kansas City-Omaha Kings
- 1975–1976: Spirits of St. Louis
- 1976: San Antonio Spurs
- 1977–1990: Olimpia Milano

Coaching
- 1990–1994: Olimpia Milano
- 1994–1997: Benetton Basket
- 1997–1998: Denver Nuggets (assistant)
- 1998–1999: Denver Nuggets
- 2000–2001: Portland Trail Blazers (assistant)
- 2001–2002: Benetton Basket
- 2002–2003: Phoenix Suns (assistant)
- 2003–2008: Phoenix Suns
- 2008–2012: New York Knicks
- 2012–2014: Los Angeles Lakers
- 2015–2016: Philadelphia 76ers (associate HC)
- 2016–2020: Houston Rockets
- 2020–2021: Brooklyn Nets (assistant)

Career highlights
- As player: 2× EuroLeague champion (1987, 1988); Korać Cup champion (1985); FIBA Intercontinental Cup champion (1987); 5× Italian League champion (1982, 1985–1987, 1989); 2× Italian Cup winner (1986, 1987); 6× Italian League steals leaders (1979–1983, 1985); 50 Greatest Contributors in EuroLeague History (2008); No. 8 retired by Olimpia Milano; No. 10 retired by Marshall Thundering Herd; As coach: 2× NBA Coach of the Year (2005, 2017); 2× NBA All-Star Game head coach (2007, 2018); NBCA Co-Coach of the Year (2017); 2× Italian League champion (1997, 2002); 2× Italian Supercup winner (2001, 2002); Italian Cup winner (1995); Saporta Cup champion (1995); Korać Cup champion (1993)

Career NBA/ABA statistics
- Points: 605 (3.4 ppg)
- Rebounds: 262 (1.5 rpg)
- Assists: 363 (2.0 apg)
- Stats at NBA.com
- Stats at Basketball Reference
- Basketball Hall of Fame
Medals
Men's basketball
Representing the United States
Olympic Games
Assistant coach for the United States
| Gold medal – first place | 2008 Beijing | Team |
| Gold medal – first place | 2012 London | Team |
FIBA World Championship
Assistant coach for the United States
| Bronze medal – third place | 2006 Japan | Men's basketball |
FIBA Americas Championship
Assistant coach for the United States
| Gold medal – first place | 2007 Las Vegas | Men's basketball |

Michael Andrew D'Antoni (born May 8, 1951) is an American-Italian professional basketball coach and former player who most recently served as a coaching advisor for the New Orleans Pelicans of the National Basketball Association (NBA).

While head coach of the Phoenix Suns, he won NBA Coach of the Year honors for the 2004–05 NBA season after the Suns posted 33 more wins than the previous season. He coached the New York Knicks starting in 2008 before resigning in 2012. He was hired by the Los Angeles Lakers seven games into the 2012–13 season. On June 1, 2016, D'Antoni was named head coach of the Rockets, and he received his second NBA Coach of the Year award for the 2016–17 season. D'Antoni is known for favoring a fast-paced, offense-oriented system. Guards Steve Nash and James Harden would win the NBA Most Valuable Player Award playing under D'Antoni's system.

== Playing career ==
=== High school and college ===
After playing high school basketball at Mullens High School, in Mullens, West Virginia, D'Antoni played college basketball at Marshall University, with the Thundering Herd, from 1970 to 1973.

=== Professional career ===
D'Antoni was selected by the Kansas City-Omaha Kings in the second round of the 1973 NBA draft. After playing three seasons for the Kings (1973–1975), he played for the Spirits of St. Louis of the American Basketball Association (ABA) in 1975–76, and a two-game stint with the NBA San Antonio Spurs in 1976–77 before being released and joining the Italian team Olimpia Milano.

By the time he retired after 13 seasons with the club, he had become its all-time leading scorer, and had been voted (in 1990) the Italian LBA league's top point guard of all time. Along the way he had paced his team to five Italian League titles, two FIBA European Champions Cup (now called EuroLeague) titles, two Italian Cups, one FIBA Korać Cup, and one FIBA Intercontinental Cup.

During his playing career in Italy, D'Antoni earned the nickname "Il Baffo" (Italian for "The Mustache"), in reference to his ever-present facial hair. He also earned the nickname "Arsène Lupin" because of his ability to steal the ball. In 2015, Olimpia Milano retired his No. 8 jersey.

=== National team career ===
Having an Italian heritage, the American-born D'Antoni sought dual citizenship, and was selected to play on the senior men's Italian national team for the EuroBasket tournament in 1989.

== Coaching career ==
=== Olimpia Milano (1990–1994) ===
D'Antoni became head coach with Olimpia Milan after his playing career with the club ended in 1990. He remained there for four seasons, from 1990 to 1994, leading the club to a 1992 FIBA EuroLeague Final Four appearance, and a 1992–93 season FIBA Korać Cup title.

=== Benetton Treviso (1994–1997) ===
D'Antoni was then chosen to coach Benetton Treviso, another major Italian league basketball club. During his tenure with Treviso (1994–1997), the team captured the FIBA European Cup (later renamed Saporta Cup) and Italian Cup (in 1995), and won the Italian national domestic league title in the 1996–97 season. D'Antoni's Italian club teams went to the Italian League's playoffs each season.

=== Denver Nuggets (1997–1999) ===
D'Antoni moved on to the NBA, where he became director of player personnel for the Denver Nuggets in 1997–98. He also did some broadcasting work with TNT.

The next year he became the Nuggets' head coach, but was fired after a poor performance during the lockout-shortened 1998–99 season.

=== San Antonio Spurs (1999–2000) ===
D'Antoni worked as a scout for the San Antonio Spurs during the 1999–2000 season.

=== Portland Trail Blazers (2000–2001) ===
D'Antoni was an assistant coach with the Portland Trail Blazers in 2000–01.

=== Return to Benetton (2001–2002) ===
In 2001, D'Antoni returned to Italy for a second stint as the coach of Benetton Treviso. In his one-season back in Europe, he led Treviso to a 28–8 regular season record in the Italian League, an Italian League championship, and to a 2002 Euroleague Final Four appearance, coaching a team filled with many former NBA stars.

=== Phoenix Suns (2002–2008) ===
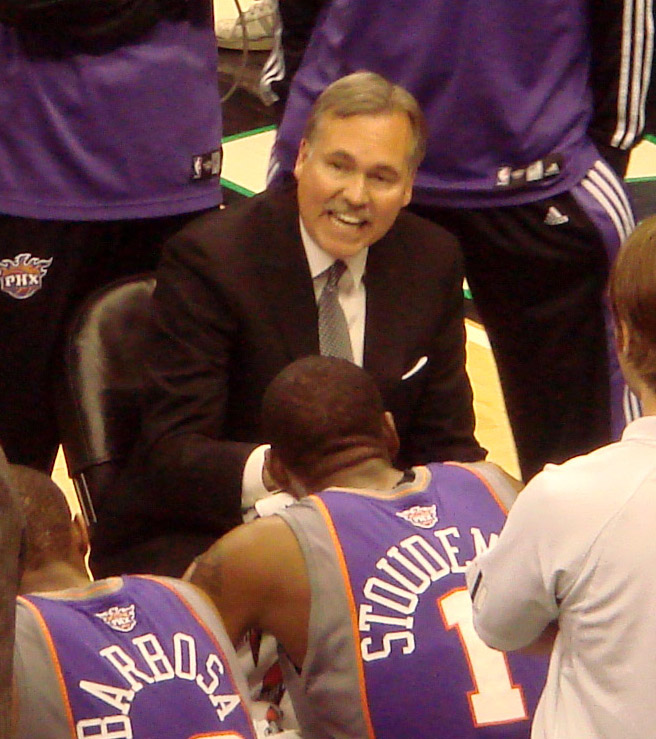
D'Antoni coaching the Suns, 2008

In 2002, D'Antoni made his return to the NBA as a Phoenix Suns assistant under Frank Johnson. In 2003, he replaced Johnson with 61 games left in the season as the Suns' head coach and, despite the team's failure to improve in the second half of the season, received a vote of confidence for producing inspired play from the injury-riddled team. With the acquisition of free agent Steve Nash before the 2004–05 season, an incredible turnaround began for the team. Nash was experienced in the run-and-gun style from his previous stints with the Dallas Mavericks and the Suns. He excelled running D'Antoni's pick-and-roll offense. D'Antoni won the NBA Coach of the Year Award after his Suns went 62–20 to finish first in the regular season. His style, dubbed "Seven Seconds or Less", was described in a book of that name. Overall, his Suns won 50 or more games in four consecutive seasons, while Nash earned NBA MVP honors in 2005 and 2006. In addition to Nash, D'Antoni's Suns also featured All-Star power forward Amar'e Stoudemire and high-flying All-Star small forward Shawn Marion. They made consecutive appearances in the Western Conference finals in 2005 and 2006, losing to the San Antonio Spurs and Dallas Mavericks, respectively. D'Antoni became the Suns' GM after Bryan Colangelo's departure and passed on the post to Steve Kerr in 2007. The Suns were eliminated in the playoffs by the Spurs in 2007 and 2008, after which D'Antoni left Phoenix for the New York Knicks.

=== New York Knicks (2008–2012) ===
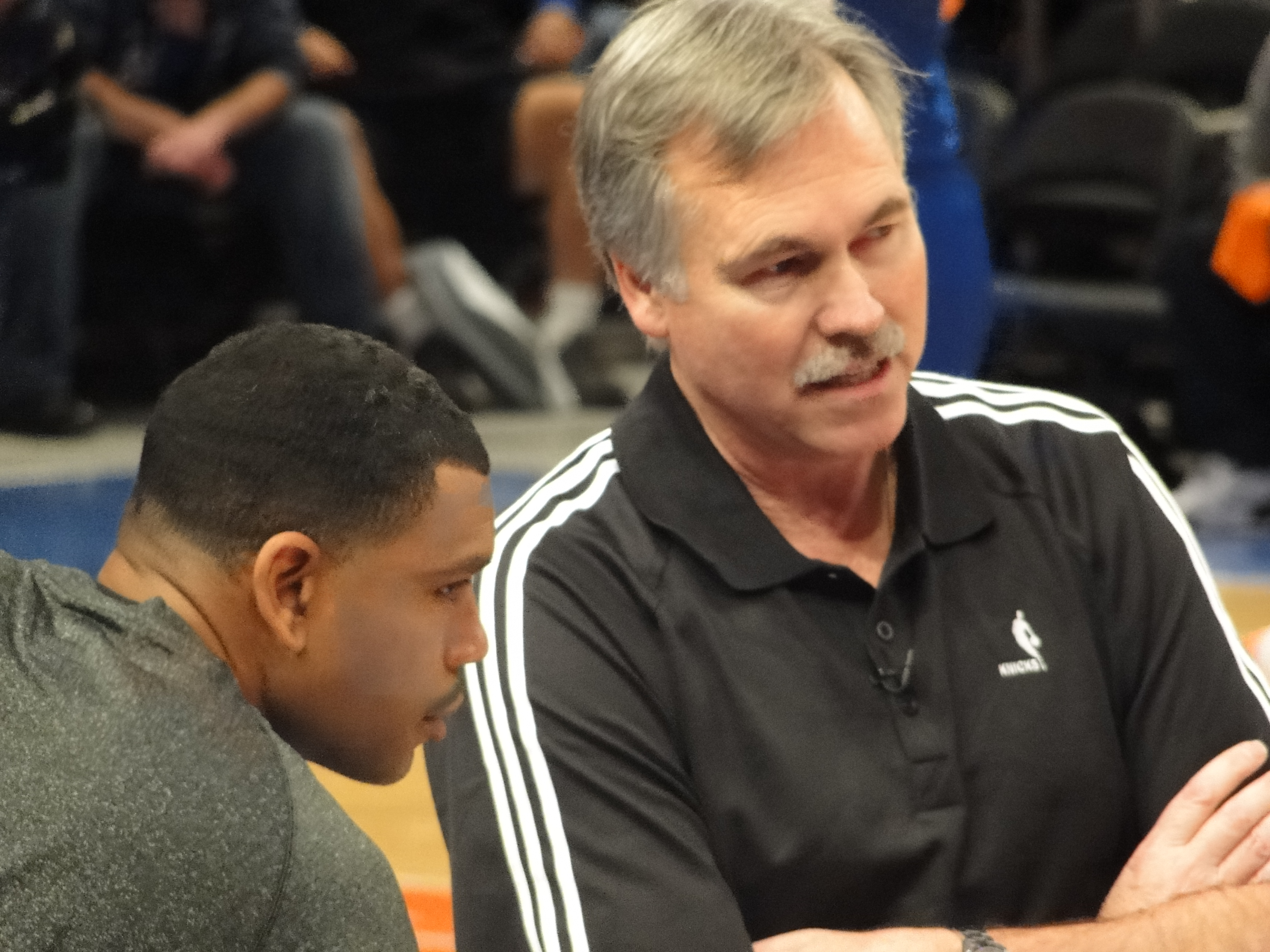
D'Antoni and Allan Houston with the Knicks

Although Steve Kerr requested he stay with the Suns, D'Antoni was told that he was free to speak with other teams about coaching jobs. On May 9, D'Antoni was made an offer by the New York Knicks. The next day, he accepted the 4-year, $24 million offer and became the Knicks' head coach.

After two losing seasons, D'Antoni with new additions Amar'e Stoudemire and Carmelo Anthony led the Knicks to the playoffs in 2010–11 with a 42–40 record. They were swept by the Boston Celtics in the first round.

D'Antoni resigned as coach on March 14, 2012, and assistant coach Mike Woodson filled his vacancy as the head coach. The Knicks were off to a disappointing 18–24 start, and D'Antoni clashed with Anthony.

=== Los Angeles Lakers (2012–2014) ===
On November 12, 2012, the Lakers signed D'Antoni to a three-year contract worth $12 million. He replaced Mike Brown, who was fired as head coach after a 1–4 start to the 2012–13 season. The Lakers first contacted former Lakers coach Phil Jackson about the opening, but D'Antoni was hired in a unanimous decision by the Lakers front office. The Lakers felt that D'Antoni's fast-paced style of play made him a "great fit" for the team, more suitable than Jackson's structured triangle offense. Lakers owner Jerry Buss's preference has always been for the Lakers to have a wide-open offense. D'Antoni was reunited with Nash, who was traded to the Lakers before the season. Lakers star Kobe Bryant was also familiar with D'Antoni; Bryant as a child knew him when D'Antoni was a star in Italy and Bryant's father was also playing there. Bryant grew close to D'Antoni during their time with Team USA.

D'Antoni's coaching debut with the Lakers was delayed as he recovered from knee replacement surgery. He had surgery weeks before on October 31, as he originally expected to take a year off from coaching and have months to recover. Bernie Bickerstaff, who was the Lakers' interim coach after Brown was fired, continued in that role after D'Antoni was hired. He was 4–1 as the interim coach, winning his last two as D'Antoni started leading team practices. D'Antoni named a new assistant to the Lakers' staff, his older brother Dan, who also helped with the practices. In his first press conference, D'Antoni predicted that the Lakers, then 3–5 and ranked 20th in scoring with 96.5 points per game, should instead be scoring "110–115 points a game". He wanted to revive Showtime. He reiterated general manager Mitch Kupchak's belief that the Lakers were built to win an NBA championship that season. D'Antoni was glad to be back with Nash, noting his unsuccessful stint with the Knicks without him. On November 20, he coached his first game—nine days after he was hired—in a 95–90 win against the Brooklyn Nets. In his first game back in New York in December, the Lakers lost 116–107 and dropped to 4–9 overall under D'Antoni. D'Antoni coached his first 17 games without Nash, who was recovering from a broken leg. The Lakers won three out of four after Nash returned in late December, but proceeded to lose their next six.

Calling it a permanent move, D'Antoni benched forward Pau Gasol in mid-January and started Earl Clark to form the faster and smaller lineup the coach preferred. The team was already ranked No. 2 in pace. Halfway through the season, the Lakers were in 12th place in the Western Conference with a 17–24 record. Under D'Antoni, the Lakers were 12–19 while scoring an average of 103.3 points a game but surrendering 103.4. Offensively, they reached the 110-point threshold just eight times in the 31 games, going 5–3. D'Antoni stressed that the team's focus needed to be on its defense, not offense. He likened the Lakers to an All-Star team in which "everybody gets the ball and goes one on one and then they play no defense", adding that they "haven't learned that there's a pecking order" where stars need to know their roles.

Center Dwight Howard struggled to run the pick and roll with Nash, a play D'Antoni expected to be a staple for the Lakers. D'Antoni eventually dropped his offense and played without any system. "We play basketball. The system is move the ball, play hard defense, space the floor and who's open shoots. It's not a difficult thing", said D'Antoni. The coach moved Nash off the ball and made him more of a spot-up shooter, while Bryant became the primary facilitator on offense. The defense was also more energized.

D'Antoni was named Western Conference Coach of the Month after the Lakers went 7–1 in April. They finished the season 45–37 after dropping to 17–25 in January the day of their team meeting in Memphis. They qualified for the playoffs on the final day of the season, securing the seventh seed in the West. The Lakers' expected starting five of Bryant, Nash, Howard, Gasol and Metta World Peace started together just seven times all season and without registering a win. "The Lakers didn't help things by making the coaching change and putting [D'Antoni] in that situation, which he was glad to take. But I think it was a little bit tougher than he thought it would be", Kupchak said. The Lakers faced San Antonio in the playoffs and lost in the opening round for the first time since 2007, suffering their first opening-round sweep since 1967.

In D'Antoni's first full season with the team in 2013–14, the Lakers went 27–55 for the second-worst winning percentage (.329) in team history. It was the worst 82-game record in team history and their fewest wins since the franchise moved from Minnesota. Howard left before the season as a free agent, accepting less money to join the Houston Rockets. Bryant played in just six games during the season, but he and Gasol were critical of D'Antoni's small-ball system. Nash also missed most of the season with injuries. On April 30, 2014, D'Antoni resigned as coach of the Lakers after the team declined to pick up their option for him to coach in 2015–16. He was paid an undisclosed amount of the $4 million owed him for the upcoming 2014–15 season. "Given the circumstances, I don't know that anybody could have done a better job than Mike did the past two seasons", said Kupchak.

=== Philadelphia 76ers (2015–2016) ===
On December 18, 2015, D'Antoni signed with the Philadelphia 76ers to work as associate head coach under Brett Brown.

=== Houston Rockets (2016–2020) ===
On June 1, 2016, D'Antoni was named the new head coach of the Houston Rockets.

In his first season with the Rockets, D'Antoni led the team to a 55–27 record, and the Rockets to the NBA Western Conference semi-finals. On May 7, 2017, D'Antoni and Erik Spoelstra were announced as co-recipients of the inaugural NBCA Coach of the Year Award. On June 26, 2017, he won the NBA Coach of the Year Award.

During the 2017–18 season, D'Antoni's led the Rockets to the best regular season in the NBA with a 65–17 record. However, the Rockets' playoff run ended in the NBA Western Conference finals after losing 4–3 to the Golden State Warriors.

After the 2018–19 season, the Rockets won more games in his three seasons than in any three-year stretch in franchise history (173–73). The Rockets were 23–16 in the playoffs during that same span. As a result, D'Antoni accumulated the best win-percentage of any Rockets coach.

On May 30, 2019, after the considerable dismantling of the coaching staff, D'Antoni announced that he decided not to renew his contract which was set to expire after the 2019–20 season. Prior to the announcement, he showed interest in signing a contract extension, stating: "I've let Daryl [Morey] and [owner] Tilman [Fertitta] know that I'm energized to keep coaching – and believe that I can continue to do this at a high-level for at least another three years." On June 8, it was reported that Fertitta and D'Antoni were nearing an agreement on a contract extension after the language of a buyout was removed from the previous offer—which is what caused the initial talks to die out in the first place. Ultimately, D'Antoni started the 2019–20 season with no contract extension. On September 13, 2020, a day after Houston lost the conference semifinals 4–1 to the Lakers, D'Antoni announced that he would not return to the team.

=== Brooklyn Nets (2020–2021) ===
On October 30, 2020, the Brooklyn Nets hired D'Antoni as an assistant coach under his former Phoenix Suns player Steve Nash. On July 28, 2021, he stepped down from his position after one season.

=== New Orleans Pelicans (2021–2025) ===
On August 4, 2021, D'Antoni was hired as coaching advisor by the New Orleans Pelicans. On April 29, 2025, it was announced that D'Antoni would not be retained by the Pelicans organization.

== National team career ==
D'Antoni was selected to the coaching staff for the Team USA Olympic Basketball squad under head coach Mike Krzyzewski and participated in the 2006 FIBA World Championship, winning a bronze medal. Pundits believed his familiarity with the three-point shot and the zone defense, hallmarks of the international game, were valuable assets to the team.

In the summer of 2012, D'Antoni returned to Team USA as an assistant coach again under head coach Mike Krzyzewski. He reunited with Knicks players Carmelo Anthony and Tyson Chandler on this team as they prepared for the 2012 London Summer Olympics.

== NBA/ABA career statistics ==
Legend
| GP | Games played | GS | Games started | MPG | Minutes per game |
| FG% | Field goal percentage | 3P% | 3-point field goal percentage | FT% | Free throw percentage |
| RPG | Rebounds per game | APG | Assists per game | SPG | Steals per game |
| BPG | Blocks per game | PPG | Points per game | **Bold** | Career high |

=== Regular season ===
| Year | Team | GP | MPG | FG% | 3P% | FT% | RPG | APG | SPG | BPG | PPG |
|---|---|---|---|---|---|---|---|---|---|---|---|
| 1973–74 | Kansas City–Omaha (NBA) | 52 | **19.0** | .402 | | .702 | **1.8** | **2.4** | **1.4** | **.3** | **4.8** |
| 1974–75 | Kansas City–Omaha (NBA) | **67** | 11.3 | .399 | | .778 | 1.1 | 1.6 | 1.0 | .2 | 2.5 |
| 1975–76 | Kansas City (NBA) | 9 | 11.2 | .259 | | **1.000** | 1.6 | 1.8 | 1.1 | .0 | 1.8 |
| 1975–76 | St. Louis (ABA) | 50 | 16.0 | **.475** | .000 | .731 | 1.5 | 2.3 | 1.3 | **.3** | 3.5 |
| 1976–77 | San Antonio (NBA) | 2 | 4.5 | .333 | | .500 | 1.0 | 1.0 | .0 | .0 | 1.5 |
| Career (NBA) | | 130 | 14.3 | .392 | | .736 | 1.4 | 1.9 | 1.2 | .2 | 3.3 |
| Career (overall) | | 180 | 14.8 | .414 | .000 | .735 | 1.5 | 2.0 | 1.2 | .2 | 3.4 |

=== Playoffs ===
| Year | Team | GP | MPG | FG% | FT% | RPG | APG | SPG | BPG | PPG |
|---|---|---|---|---|---|---|---|---|---|---|
| 1975 | Kansas City–Omaha (NBA) | 4 | 10.5 | .500 | 1.000 | 1.8 | .3 | 1.0 | .3 | 4.5 |

== Head coaching record ==
Legend
| Regular season | G | Games coached | W | Games won | L | Games lost | W–L % | Win–loss % |
| Playoffs | PG | Playoff games | PW | Playoff wins | PL | Playoff losses | PW–L % | Playoff win–loss % |

| Team | Year | G | W | L | W–L% | Finish | PG | PW | PL | PW–L% | Result |
|---|---|---|---|---|---|---|---|---|---|---|---|
| Denver | 1998–99 | 50 | 14 | 36 | .280 | 6th in Midwest | — | — | — | — | Missed playoffs |
| Phoenix | 2003–04 | 61 | 21 | 40 | .344 | 6th in Pacific | — | — | — | — | Missed playoffs |
| Phoenix | 2004–05 | 82 | 62 | 20 | .756 | 1st in Pacific | 15 | 9 | 6 | .600 | Lost in Conference finals |
| Phoenix | 2005–06 | 82 | 54 | 28 | .659 | 1st in Pacific | 20 | 10 | 10 | .500 | Lost in Conference finals |
| Phoenix | 2006–07 | 82 | 61 | 21 | .744 | 1st in Pacific | 11 | 6 | 5 | .545 | Lost in Conference semifinals |
| Phoenix | 2007–08 | 82 | 55 | 27 | .671 | 2nd in Pacific | 5 | 1 | 4 | .200 | Lost in First round |
| New York | 2008–09 | 82 | 32 | 50 | .390 | 5th in Atlantic | — | — | — | — | Missed playoffs |
| New York | 2009–10 | 82 | 29 | 53 | .354 | 3rd in Atlantic | — | — | — | — | Missed playoffs |
| New York | 2010–11 | 82 | 42 | 40 | .512 | 2nd in Atlantic | 4 | 0 | 4 | .000 | Lost in First round |
| New York | 2011–12 | 42 | 18 | 24 | .429 | (resigned) | — | — | — | — | — |
| L.A. Lakers | 2012–13 | 72 | 40 | 32 | .556 | 3rd in Pacific | 4 | 0 | 4 | .000 | Lost in First round |
| L.A. Lakers | 2013–14 | 82 | 27 | 55 | .329 | 5th in Pacific | — | — | — | — | Missed playoffs |
| Houston | 2016–17 | 82 | 55 | 27 | .671 | 2nd in Southwest | 11 | 6 | 5 | .545 | Lost in Conference semifinals |
| Houston | 2017–18 | 82 | 65 | 17 | .793 | 1st in Southwest | 17 | 11 | 6 | .647 | Lost in Conference finals |
| Houston | 2018–19 | 82 | 53 | 29 | .646 | 1st in Southwest | 11 | 6 | 5 | .545 | Lost in Conference semifinals |
| Houston | 2019–20 | 72 | 44 | 28 | .611 | 1st in Southwest | 12 | 5 | 7 | .417 | Lost in Conference semifinals |
| Career | | 1,199 | 672 | 527 | .560 | | 110 | 54 | 56 | .491 | |

== Personal life ==
D'Antoni's father was a high school basketball coach in West Virginia and Ohio, and was inducted into West Virginia's Sports Hall of Fame. His older brother Dan coached under him as an assistant in Phoenix, New York, and Los Angeles. Both Mike (1997) and Dan (1990) have been enshrined in the Marshall University Athletics Hall of Fame.

D'Antoni is a dual citizen of the United States and Italy, making him the first Italian to lead an NBA team. He descends from an Italian grandfather who emigrated from Umbria, Italy, to the U.S. in the early 20th century. He is fluent in English and Italian.

He lives in the Memorial neighborhood in Houston, with his wife, Laurel, and has a son named Mike.
