= Monty Williams =

American basketball coach and former player (born 1971)

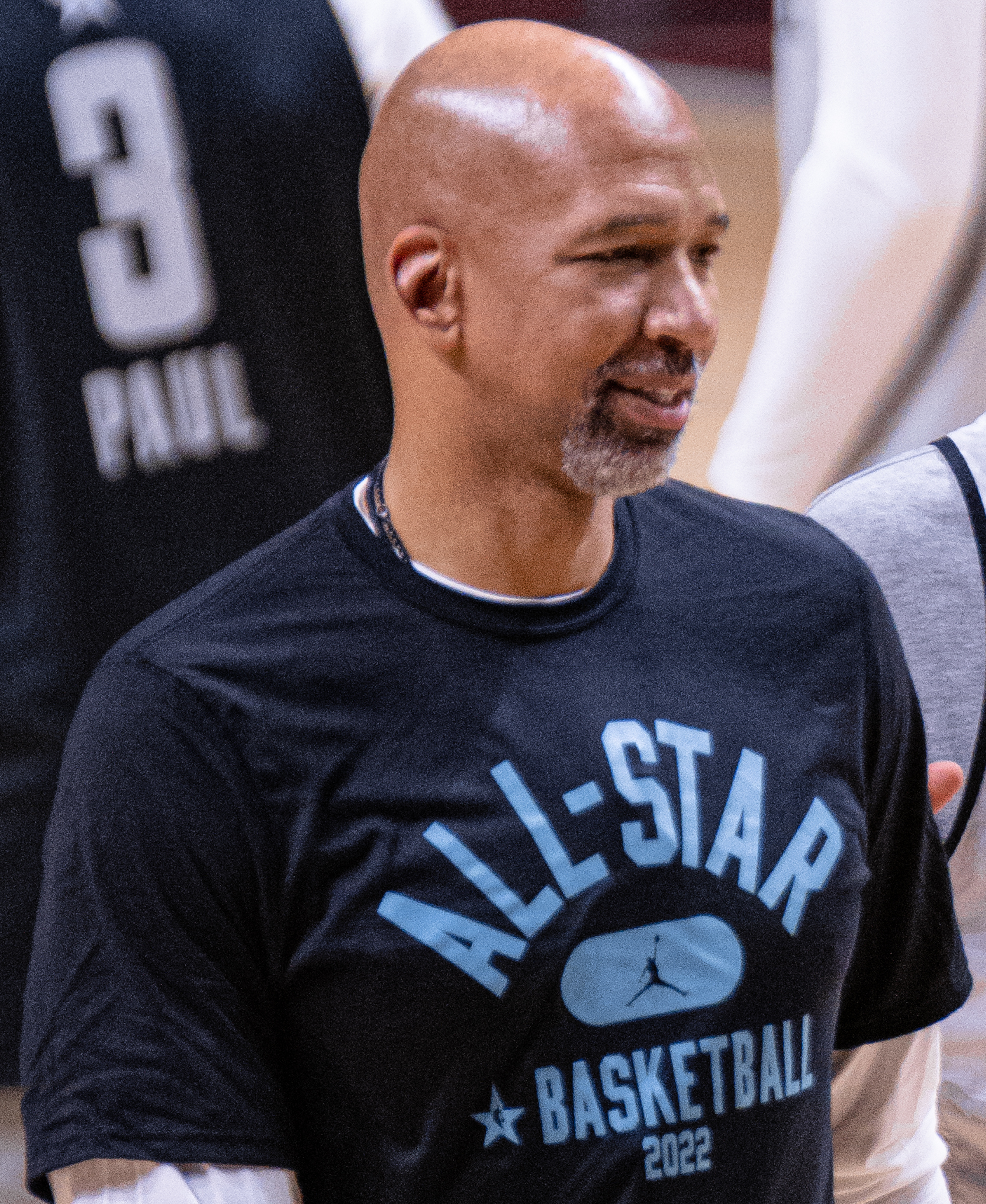
- Williams at the 2022 NBA All-Star Game

Personal information
- Born: October 8, 1971 (age 55) Fredericksburg, Virginia, U.S.
- Listed height: 6 ft 8 in (2.03 m)
- Listed weight: 225 lb (102 kg)

Career information
- High school: Potomac (Oxon Hill, Maryland)
- College: Notre Dame (1989–1994)
- NBA draft: 1994: 1st round, 24th overall pick
- Drafted by: New York Knicks
- Playing career: 1994–2003
- Position: Small forward
- Number: 2, 41, 3, 5
- Coaching career: 2005–present

Career history

Playing
- 1994–1996: New York Knicks
- 1996–1998: San Antonio Spurs
- 1999: Denver Nuggets
- 1999–2002: Orlando Magic
- 2002–2003: Philadelphia 76ers

Coaching
- 2005–2010: Portland Trail Blazers (assistant)
- 2010–2015: New Orleans Hornets / Pelicans
- 2015–2016: Oklahoma City Thunder (associate HC)
- 2018–2019: Philadelphia 76ers (assistant)
- 2019–2023: Phoenix Suns
- 2023–2024: Detroit Pistons
- 2024–present: TMI Episcopal

Career highlights
- As head coach: NBA Coach of the Year (2022); 2× NBCA Coach of the Year (2021, 2022); NBA All-Star Game head coach (2022)

Career NBA statistics
- Points: 2,884 (6.3 ppg)
- Rebounds: 1,296 (2.8 rpg)
- Assists: 544 (1.2 apg)
- Stats at NBA.com
- Stats at Basketball Reference
Medals
Men's basketball
Representing the United States
FIBA U21 World Championship
Gold medal – first place	1993 Valladolid	National team
Assistant coach for the United States
men's national basketball team
World Cup
Gold medal – first place	2014 Spain	Team
Olympic Games
Gold medal – first place	2016 Rio de Janeiro	Team

Tavares Montgomery Williams (born October 8, 1971) is an American professional basketball coach, executive, and former player of the National Basketball Association (NBA) who is the head coach of the TMI Episcopal’s boys basketball team. He most recently served as the head coach of the Detroit Pistons. Williams played for five NBA teams during a playing career that spanned from 1994 to 2003. His NBA coaching career has included stints as an assistant coach, associate head coach, and head coach.

Williams was the head coach for the New Orleans Hornets/Pelicans from 2010 until 2015. He served as an assistant coach with the United States national team under Mike Krzyzewski, and he has worked as a vice president of basketball operations for the San Antonio Spurs. In May 2019, Williams was hired as the head coach of the Phoenix Suns. In 2021, he led the Suns to their first NBA Finals appearance since 1993 and was named the NBA Coach of the Year the following year in 2022, when the Suns finished the regular season with a franchise record of 64 wins. After being dismissed by Phoenix in 2023, he had a season as head coach of the Detroit Pistons.

== Early life ==
Williams was born on October 8, 1971, in Fredericksburg, Virginia. He attended Potomac High School in Oxon Hill, Maryland, where he excelled in basketball.

== College career ==
As a 6 ft 8 in (2.03 m) small forward from the University of Notre Dame, Williams was an honorable mention All-American, averaging 22.4 points and 8.4 rebounds during his senior season. Williams was an NBA first-round pick despite a pre-existing heart condition that kept him out for two seasons at Notre Dame. He was selected by the New York Knicks in the first round (24th overall) of the 1994 NBA draft.

== Professional career ==
=== New York Knicks (1994–1996) ===
Williams played in nine NBA seasons from 1994 to 2003. Williams played for the New York Knicks from 1994 to 1996.

=== San Antonio Spurs (1996–1998) ===
Williams was traded alongside Charles Smith to the San Antonio Spurs for Brad Lohaus, J.R. Reid and a future first-round pick that became John Wallace. He played there from 1996 to 1998.

=== Denver Nuggets (1999) ===
In 1999, Williams signed with the Denver Nuggets but was released within a month.

=== Orlando Magic (1999–2002) ===
The Orlando Magic claimed Williams off waivers and he stayed with the team until 2002.

=== Philadelphia 76ers (2002–2003) ===
Williams joined the Philadelphia 76ers in free agency. In 2003, Williams was re-acquired by the Orlando Magic in a trade sending a conditional pick swap to Orlando. He was waived by the Magic three days later, effectively ending his basketball career. In his NBA career, Williams played in 456 games, scored a total of 2,884 points and averaged 6.3 points per game. Chronic knee problems forced him into retirement in 2003.

== Coaching career ==
=== San Antonio Spurs ===
In spring 2005, Williams won an NBA championship as a coaching staff intern with the San Antonio Spurs.

=== Portland Trail Blazers (2005–2010) ===
In fall 2005, Williams was hired by new head coach Nate McMillan as an assistant coach for the Portland Trail Blazers.

=== New Orleans Hornets / Pelicans (2010–2015) ===
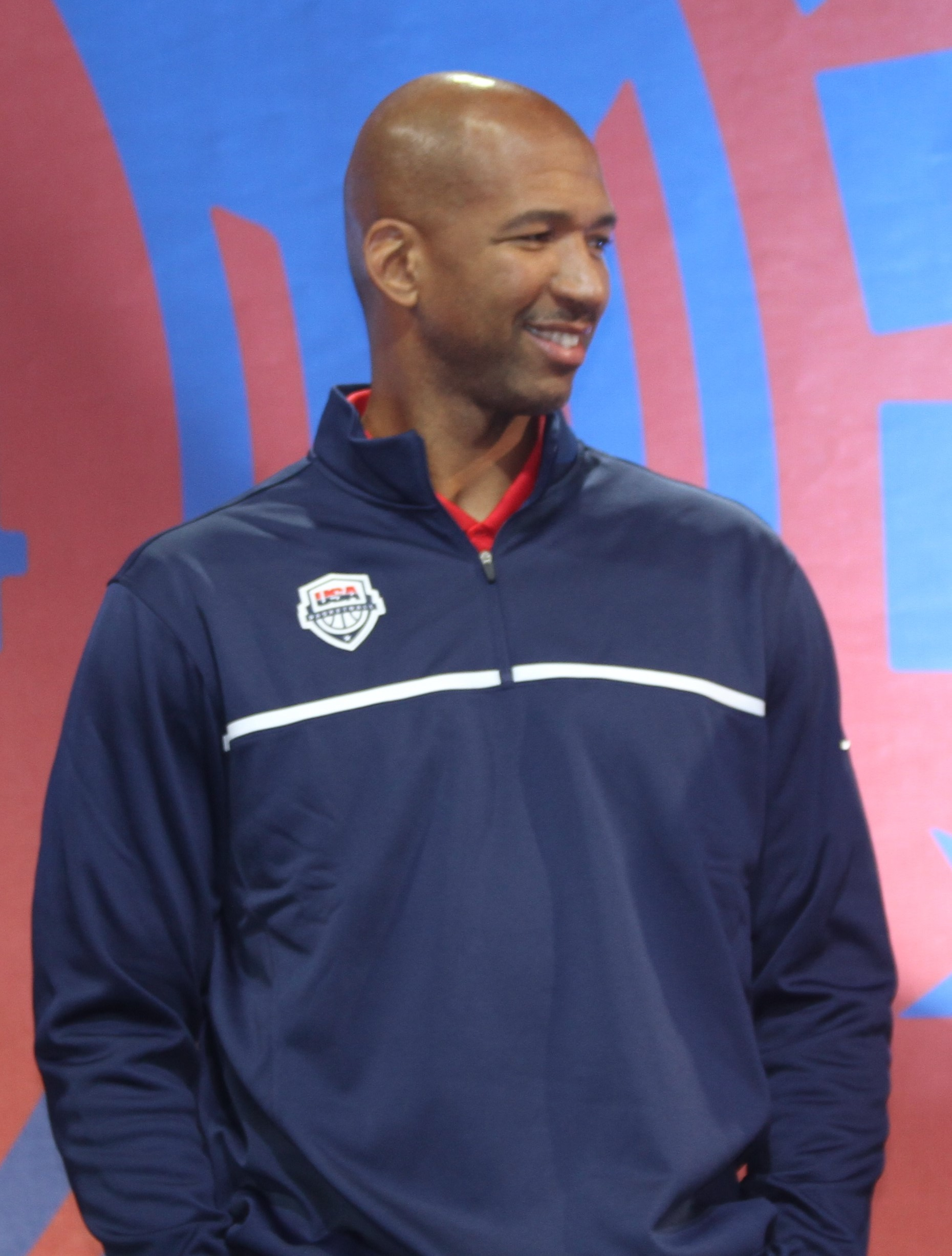
Williams in 2014

On June 7, 2010, Williams was offered a three-year contract to be the head coach of the New Orleans Hornets. At the date of hiring, Williams became the youngest head coach in the NBA at 38 years old. In his first season with the Hornets, the team finished with a 46–36 record and made the playoffs. On August 18, 2012, Williams accepted a four-year contract extension from the Hornets (later renamed as the Pelicans). On June 9, 2013, Williams accepted an assistant coach role with the U.S. national team, along with Jim Boeheim and Tom Thibodeau, for the 2016 Summer Olympics in Rio de Janeiro, Brazil. The New Orleans Pelicans finished the 2014–15 season with a 45–37 record before losing to the Golden State Warriors in the first round of the playoffs. On May 12, 2015, Williams was let go after five seasons as head coach of the Pelicans, compiling a 173–221 regular season record and going 2–8 in the playoffs.

=== Oklahoma City Thunder (2015–2016) ===
On June 29, 2015, Williams became the associate head coach of the Oklahoma City Thunder. On June 1, 2016, it was announced that Williams would not return with the Thunder.

=== Philadelphia 76ers (2018–2019) ===
On June 4, 2018, Brett Brown announced that Williams would join his staff in Philadelphia as the lead assistant coach, his first coaching job in two seasons.

=== Phoenix Suns (2019–2023) ===
On May 3, 2019, the Phoenix Suns announced they had signed Williams as the team's head coach on a five-year deal. The Suns compiled a 26–39 record in his first season coaching them before the season was postponed due to the COVID-19 pandemic. The Suns were later invited to the 2020 NBA Bubble in order to play eight seeding games, where Williams coached the Suns to an 8–0 record, improving their overall record that season to 34–39. Despite this, the Suns failed to qualify for the play-in tournament to enter the 2020 NBA playoffs.

On November 16, 2020, Williams reunited with star point guard Chris Paul after last coaching him back in 2011 when they were with the New Orleans Hornets. After the conclusion of the 2020–21 season Williams was named NBCA Coach of the Year. He also finished second in the NBA Coach of the Year voting behind Tom Thibodeau. The Suns finished the season with a 51–21 record, clinching the division and the second seed in the Western Conference. Williams coached the Suns to a first round series victory over the defending champion Los Angeles Lakers in six games, and a sweep of the Denver Nuggets in the conference semifinals. Williams then coached the Suns to a Western Conference finals victory over the Los Angeles Clippers in six games, advancing the Suns to the NBA Finals for the first time since 1993. It was also the first Finals appearance for Williams in his coaching career. Facing the Milwaukee Bucks, the Suns would lose in six games.

On December 27, 2021, Williams was placed in the Suns COVID-19 protocol. On January 30, 2022, Williams was named as the Western Conference head coach for the 2022 NBA All-Star Game as a result of his team's NBA-best record at 40–9. Williams and the Suns were the first team to clinch a playoff berth in the season, after reaching a 53–13 record. The Suns finished the season with franchise record for wins, compiling 64 against 18 losses. Williams was selected for his second consecutive NBCA Coach of the Year award. On March 9, Williams was named the 2021–22 season NBA Coach of the Year leading the Suns to a franchise record in wins and the best record in the league (64–18). However, in the playoffs they fell in the Western Conference semifinals to the Dallas Mavericks in seven games.

On July 27, 2022, the Suns signed Williams to a multi-year contract extension.

On May 13, 2023, the Suns fired Williams after losing to the eventual champion Denver Nuggets in the Western Conference semifinals of the 2023 NBA playoffs. He had three years and over $20 million left on his contract.

=== Detroit Pistons (2023–2024) ===
On June 2, 2023, Williams signed a six-year, $78.5 million to be head coach of the Detroit Pistons, reportedly the richest contract in NBA history for a coach. During Williams' first year as head coach for the Pistons, the team lost 28 straight games, the longest losing streak within one season in NBA history. They also became the thirteenth team in NBA history to have a winless month, going 0–15 in November. On June 19, 2024, after one season, and leading the Pistons to the worst record of the 2023–24 season with 14–68 (also a franchise-worst), Williams was fired. He had $65 million and 5 years remaining on his contract.

=== TMI Episcopal (2024–present) ===
On October 20, 2024, Williams accepted the boys’ basketball head coaching position at TMI Episcopal in San Antonio, Texas, where he will coach his sons Elijah and Micah.

== Executive career ==
=== San Antonio Spurs ===
In 2016, Williams became the vice president of basketball operations for the San Antonio Spurs. On June 26, 2017, while serving as vice president for the Spurs, Williams was selected as the winner of the Sager Strong Award during the first NBA Awards show.

== Personal life ==
On February 10, 2016, Williams' first wife, Ingrid, died from injuries sustained from a car crash in Oklahoma City after her car was struck head-on by a vehicle that crossed lanes after losing control. The couple had five children together. Williams married his second wife Lisa Keeth in 2017. He is a Christian.

== Career playing statistics ==
Legend
GP	Games played	GS	Games started	MPG	Minutes per game
FG%	Field goal percentage	3P%	3-point field goal percentage	FT%	Free throw percentage
RPG	Rebounds per game	APG	Assists per game	SPG	Steals per game
BPG	Blocks per game	PPG	Points per game	**Bold**	Career high

=== NBA ===
==== Regular season ====
Year	Team	GP	GS	MPG	FG%	3P%	FT%	RPG	APG	SPG	BPG	PPG
1994–95	New York	41	23	12.3	.451	.000	.447	2.4	1.2	.5	.1	3.3
1995–96	New York	14	0	4.4	.318	–	.625	1.2	.3	.1	.0	1.4
1995–96	San Antonio	17	0	7.2	.435	.000	**.750**	1.4	.2	.2	.1	2.9
1996–97	San Antonio	65	**26**	**20.7**	.509	.000	.645	3.2	**1.4**	**.8**	**.8**	**9.0**
1997–98	San Antonio	72	16	18.3	.448	**.500**	.670	2.5	1.2	.5	.3	6.3
1998–99	Denver	1	0	6.0	.000	–	.500	.0	.0	.0	.0	1.0
1999–2000	Orlando	75	23	20.0	.489	.400	.741	3.3	**1.4**	.6	.2	8.7
2000–01	Orlando	**82**	0	14.8	.447	.077	.639	3.0	1.0	.4	.2	5.0
2001–02	Orlando	68	19	18.9	**.547**	.000	.657	**3.5**	**1.4**	.7	.3	7.1
2002–03	Philadelphia	21	2	13.1	.425	.000	**.750**	2.1	1.2	.6	.2	4.4
Career		456	109	16.7	.481	.111	.665	2.8	1.2	.6	.3	6.3

==== Playoffs ====
Year	Team	GP	GS	MPG	FG%	3P%	FT%	RPG	APG	SPG	BPG	PPG
1995	New York	1	0	4.0	**1.000**	–	–	.0	.0	.0	.0	4.0
1996	San Antonio	7	0	4.1	.222	–	.500	1.0	.0	.0	.0	1.0
1998	San Antonio	5	0	5.6	.625	–	.667	1.2	.2	.0	.0	2.4
2001	Orlando	3	0	4.7	.750	–	.333	2.0	.0	.0	**.7**	2.3
2002	Orlando	4	**3**	**23.3**	.519	.000	.600	**5.5**	**2.3**	**.8**	.0	**8.5**
2003	Philadelphia	**10**	0	9.6	.348	.000	**.750**	1.5	.0	.2	.0	1.9
Career		30	3	8.8	.466	.000	.577	1.9	.3	.2	.1	2.8

== Head coaching record ==
Legend
Regular season	G	Games coached	W	Games won	L	Games lost	W–L %	Win–loss %
Playoffs	PG	Playoff games	PW	Playoff wins	PL	Playoff losses	PW–L %	Playoff win–loss %

Team	Year	G	W	L	W–L%	Finish	PG	PW	PL	PW–L%	Result
New Orleans	2010–11	82	46	36	.561	3rd in Southwest	6	2	4	.333	Lost in First round
New Orleans	2011–12	66	21	45	.318	5th in Southwest	—	—	—	—	Missed playoffs
New Orleans	2012–13	82	27	55	.329	5th in Southwest	—	—	—	—	Missed playoffs
New Orleans	2013–14	82	34	48	.415	5th in Southwest	—	—	—	—	Missed playoffs
New Orleans	2014–15	82	45	37	.549	5th in Southwest	4	0	4	.000	Lost in First round
Phoenix	2019–20	73	34	39	.466	3rd in Pacific	—	—	—	—	Missed playoffs
Phoenix	2020–21	72	51	21	.708	1st in Pacific	22	14	8	.636	Lost in NBA Finals
Phoenix	2021–22	82	64	18	.780	1st in Pacific	13	7	6	.538	Lost in Conference semifinals
Phoenix	2022–23	82	45	37	.549	2nd in Pacific	11	6	5	.545	Lost in Conference semifinals
Detroit	2023–24	82	14	68	.171	5th in Central	—	—	—	—	Missed playoffs
Career		785	381	404	.485		56	29	27	.518	
