= National Basketball Coaches Association =

Union for coaches in the United States National Basketball Association

- Formation: 1976
- Founder: Tommy Heinsohn
- Type: Union of coaches
- Region served: USA, Canada
- Executive: David S. Fogel
- Parent organization: NBA
- Website: nbacoaches.com

The National Basketball Coaches Association (NBCA) is an American organization and union that represents coaches in the National Basketball Association (NBA). It was founded in 1976 and consists of all NBA head coaches, assistant coaches and alumni.

The current executive director is David S. Fogel.

It administers the league's NBA Coach of the Year Award, which dates back to 1962, and is voted on by a media panel of writers, reporters and broadcasters.

In 2009, it established the Chuck Daly Lifetime Achievement Award, in honor of the former Pistons, Magic, Nets, and Cavaliers coach.

In 2017, it created the NBCA Coach of the Year Award, in honor of the Association's longtime executive director. The annual winner is selected by the 30 head coaches in the NBA.

== See also ==
- NFL Coaches Association
