= 2019–20 NBA season =

74th NBA season, longest season in the NBA

- League: National Basketball Association
- Sport: Basketball
- Duration: October 22, 2019 – March 11, 2020 (regular season before suspension); July 30 – August 14, 2020 (completion of regular season with "seeding" games); August 15, 2020 (play-in game); August 17 – September 27, 2020 (playoffs); September 30 – October 11, 2020 (finals)
- Games: 63–67 games per team before regular season suspension (total of 8 teams not in NBA Bubble); 8 games per team after regular season suspension (71–75 total for 22 teams in NBA Bubble)
- Teams: 30
- TV partner(s): ABC, TNT, ESPN, NBA TV

Draft
- Top draft pick: Zion Williamson
- Picked by: New Orleans Pelicans

Regular season
- Top seed: Milwaukee Bucks
- Season MVP: Giannis Antetokounmpo (Milwaukee)
- Top scorer: James Harden (Houston)

Playoffs
- Eastern champions: Miami Heat
- Eastern runners-up: Boston Celtics
- Western champions: Los Angeles Lakers
- Western runners-up: Denver Nuggets

Finals
- Champions: Los Angeles Lakers
- Runners-up: Miami Heat
- Finals MVP: LeBron James (L.A. Lakers)

NBA seasons
- ← 2018–19 2020–21 →

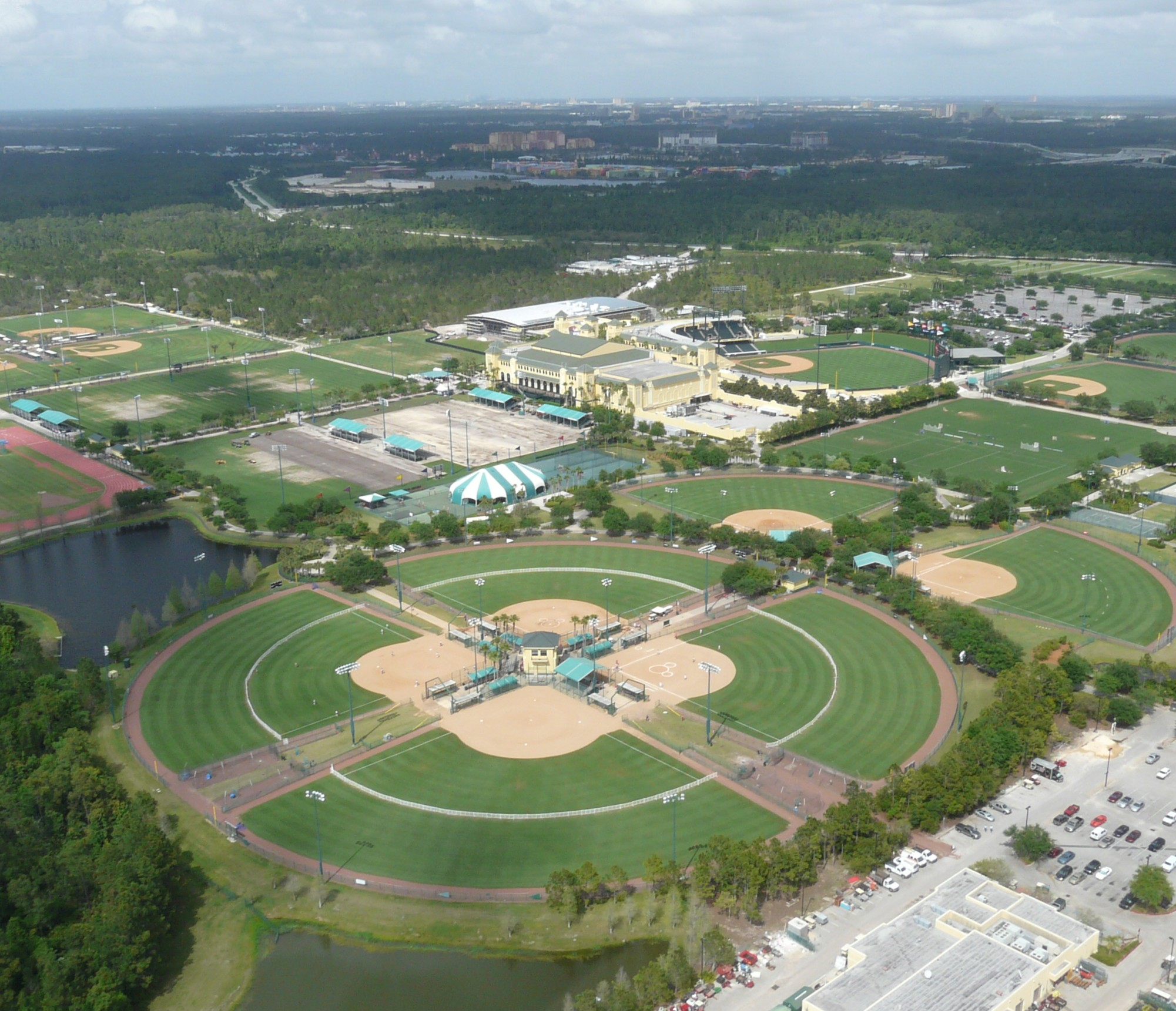
Due to the COVID-19 pandemic, the rest of the season was played at the ESPN Wide World of Sports Complex in Bay Lake, Florida, including the NBA playoffs and Finals.

The 2019–20 NBA season was the 74th season of the National Basketball Association (NBA). The regular season began on October 22, 2019, and originally was scheduled to end on April 15, 2020. The 2020 NBA All-Star Game was played on February 16, at the United Center in Chicago, and was won by Team LeBron, 157–155. The playoffs were originally scheduled to begin on April 18, and end with the NBA Finals in June.

On January 26, the season took an abrupt delicate turn when Los Angeles Lakers legend Kobe Bryant, who was less than four years into retirement from the league, died in a helicopter crash in Calabasas, California, along with his 13-year-old daughter Gianna and seven others. A number of tributes and memorials were issued, and the All-Star MVP Award was renamed in Bryant's honor.

The season was suspended on March 11 as a result of the Utah Jazz–Oklahoma City Thunder game being postponed due to Rudy Gobert testing positive for COVID-19 at the onset of the COVID-19 pandemic. At the time of the suspension, teams had played between 63 and 67 games.

On June 4, the NBA board of governors approved a plan to restart the season on July 30, and the National Basketball Players Association approved this plan the next day. Under the plan, 22 teams played eight additional regular season games to determine playoff seeding, and 16 teams entered a conventional postseason tournament. All of these games took place in the NBA Bubble, an isolation zone specifically created for NBA operations at the ESPN Wide World of Sports Complex at Walt Disney World in Bay Lake, Florida.

On August 26, the season was suspended for a second time by a wildcat strike, to protest the shooting of Jacob Blake and police brutality, during the playoffs. Play resumed three days later on August 29. The Finals ended on October 11, 2020, 355 days after the October 22, 2019, regular season opening day, and 377 days after the first pre-season games on September 30, 2019. In the NBA Finals, the Los Angeles Lakers defeated the Miami Heat, 4 games to 2, to win their 17th NBA championship. This was the longest season in NBA history.

== Transactions ==
=== Retirement ===
- On March 1, 2019, Channing Frye announced his retirement from the NBA. Frye played 13 seasons in the NBA, winning one championship with the Cleveland Cavaliers in 2016.
- On April 9, 2019, Dirk Nowitzki announced his retirement from the NBA. Nowitzki played all his 21 seasons with the Dallas Mavericks franchise, winning one championship and Finals MVP with the Mavericks in 2011, and also led them to a Finals appearance in 2006.
- On June 10, 2019, Tony Parker announced his retirement from the NBA. He played 18 seasons in the NBA and was a four-time NBA champion and Finals MVP in 2007 with the San Antonio Spurs.
- On June 28, 2019, Darren Collison announced his retirement from the NBA. He played for five franchises during his 10-year NBA career.
- On August 29, 2019, Zaza Pachulia announced his retirement from the NBA. He played for six franchises during his 16-year career. He won two championships with the Golden State Warriors.
- On September 13, 2019, Shaun Livingston announced his retirement from the NBA. He played for ten franchises during his 15-year NBA career. He won three championships with the Golden State Warriors.
- On October 17, 2019, Luol Deng signed a ceremonial one-day contract with the Chicago Bulls and officially retired as a Bull after playing 15 seasons. He was a two-time All-Star with the Bulls.
- On November 4, 2019, José Calderón announced his retirement from the NBA. He played for seven franchises during his 14-year NBA career.
- On December 28, 2019, Zach Randolph announced his retirement from the NBA, Randolph played for five franchises during his 17-year NBA career. He was a two-time All-Star with the Memphis Grizzlies.
- On February 16, 2020, Marcin Gortat announced his retirement from the NBA. He played for four franchises during his 12-year NBA career.
- On April 14, 2020, Trevor Booker announced his retirement from the NBA. He played for five franchises during his eight-year NBA career.
- On June 25, 2020, Vince Carter announced his retirement from the NBA. Carter played for eight franchises during a record 22-year career in the NBA; he is the only player to play in four different decades and was the last active player to have been drafted and played in the 1990s.

=== Free agency ===
Free agency negotiations began on June 30, 2019, at 6 p.m. ET, unlike July 1 from previous seasons. Players officially signed after the July moratorium on July 6 at 12 p.m. ET.

=== Coaching changes ===
Coaching changes
Team	2018–19 season	2019–20 season
Off–season
Cleveland Cavaliers	Larry Drew	John Beilein
Los Angeles Lakers	Luke Walton	Frank Vogel
Memphis Grizzlies	J. B. Bickerstaff	Taylor Jenkins
Phoenix Suns	Igor Kokoškov	Monty Williams
Sacramento Kings	Dave Joerger	Luke Walton
In-season
Team	Outgoing coach	Incoming coach
New York Knicks	David Fizdale	Mike Miller
Cleveland Cavaliers	John Beilein	J. B. Bickerstaff
Brooklyn Nets	Kenny Atkinson	Jacque Vaughn

==== Off-season ====
- On April 11, 2019, the Cleveland Cavaliers and Larry Drew parted ways after Drew's contract expired after the 2018–19 season.
- On April 11, 2019, the Memphis Grizzlies fired J. B. Bickerstaff after nearly two seasons.
- On April 11, 2019, the Sacramento Kings fired Dave Joerger after three seasons. The team missed the playoffs for the thirteenth straight year.
- On April 12, 2019, the Los Angeles Lakers and head coach Luke Walton parted ways after three seasons.
- On April 14, 2019, the Sacramento Kings hired Luke Walton as their new head coach.
- On April 22, 2019, the Phoenix Suns fired Igor Kokoškov after one season. The team missed the playoffs for the ninth straight year.
- On May 3, 2019, the Phoenix Suns hired Monty Williams as their new head coach.
- On May 13, 2019, the Cleveland Cavaliers hired John Beilein as their new head coach.
- On May 13, 2019, the Los Angeles Lakers hired Frank Vogel as their new head coach.
- On June 11, 2019, the Memphis Grizzlies hired Taylor Jenkins as their new head coach.

==== In-season ====
- On December 6, 2019, the New York Knicks fired head coach David Fizdale after a 4–18 start to the season and named Mike Miller as interim head coach.
- On February 19, 2020, the Cleveland Cavaliers named J. B. Bickerstaff the new head coach of the team after John Beilein resigned from the position.
- On March 7, 2020, the Brooklyn Nets and head coach Kenny Atkinson mutually agreed to part ways. Jacque Vaughn was named interim head coach.

== Preseason ==
The preseason began on September 30 and ended on October 18.

=== International games ===
The Indiana Pacers and the Sacramento Kings played two preseason games at the NSCI Dome in Mumbai, India on October 4 and 5, 2019.

The Toronto Raptors and the Houston Rockets played two preseason games at the Saitama Super Arena in Saitama City, Japan on October 8 and 10, 2019.

The Los Angeles Lakers and the Brooklyn Nets played two preseason games in China, in Shanghai on October 10 and in Shenzhen on October 12.

The Los Angeles Clippers and the Dallas Mavericks played one preseason game in Canada, at Rogers Arena in Vancouver on October 17.

== Regular season ==
The 2019–20 schedule was released on August 12, 2019, and the regular season began on October 22, 2019.

On March 11, 2020, the season was suspended due to the COVID-19 pandemic. The reformatted regular season, with 8 more games scheduled for 22 qualified teams going to the NBA Bubble in Orlando, was released on June 26. The regular season resumed play within the bubble on July 30.

Eastern Conference

Atlantic Division	W	L	PCT	GB	Home	Road	Div	GP
y – Toronto Raptors	53	19	.736	–	26‍–‍10	27‍–‍9	9–5	72
x – Boston Celtics	48	24	.667	5.0	26‍–‍10	22‍–‍14	9–6	72
x – Philadelphia 76ers	43	30	.589	10.5	31‍–‍4	12‍–‍26	11–5	73
x – Brooklyn Nets	35	37	.486	18.0	20‍–‍16	15‍–‍21	6–10	72
New York Knicks	21	45	.318	29.0	11‍–‍22	10‍–‍23	2–11	66

Central Division	W	L	PCT	GB	Home	Road	Div	GP
z – Milwaukee Bucks	56	17	.767	–	30‍–‍5	26‍–‍12	13–1	73
x – Indiana Pacers	45	28	.616	11.0	25‍–‍11	20‍–‍17	8–7	73
Chicago Bulls	22	43	.338	30.0	14‍–‍20	8‍–‍23	7–9	65
Detroit Pistons	20	46	.303	32.5	11‍–‍22	9‍–‍24	5–10	66
Cleveland Cavaliers	19	46	.292	33.0	11‍–‍25	8‍–‍21	4–10	65

Southeast Division	W	L	PCT	GB	Home	Road	Div	GP
y – Miami Heat	44	29	.603	–	29‍–‍7	15‍–‍22	10–4	73
x – Orlando Magic	33	40	.452	11.0	18‍–‍17	15‍–‍23	9–5	73
Washington Wizards	25	47	.347	18.5	16‍–‍20	9‍–‍27	5–9	72
Charlotte Hornets	23	42	.354	17.0	10‍–‍21	13‍–‍21	2–7	65
Atlanta Hawks	20	47	.299	21.0	14‍–‍20	6‍–‍27	6–7	67

Western Conference

Northwest Division	W	L	PCT	GB	Home	Road	Div	GP
y – Denver Nuggets	46	27	.630	–	26‍–‍11	20‍–‍16	12–2	73
x – Oklahoma City Thunder	44	28	.611	1.5	23‍–‍14	21‍–‍14	8–5	72
x – Utah Jazz	44	28	.611	1.5	23‍–‍12	21‍–‍16	5–7	72
x – Portland Trail Blazers	35	39	.473	11.5	21‍–‍15	14‍–‍24	5–8	74
Minnesota Timberwolves	19	45	.297	22.5	8‍–‍24	11‍–‍21	2–10	64

Pacific Division	W	L	PCT	GB	Home	Road	Div	GP
c – Los Angeles Lakers	52	19	.732	–	25‍–‍10	27‍–‍9	10–3	71
x – Los Angeles Clippers	49	23	.681	3.5	27‍–‍9	22‍–‍14	8–6	72
Phoenix Suns	34	39	.466	19.0	17‍–‍22	17‍–‍17	6–9	73
Sacramento Kings	31	41	.431	21.5	16‍–‍19	15‍–‍22	8–5	72
Golden State Warriors	15	50	.231	34.0	8‍–‍26	7‍–‍24	2–11	65

Southwest Division	W	L	PCT	GB	Home	Road	Div	GP
y – Houston Rockets	44	28	.611	–	24‍–‍12	20‍–‍16	8–5	72
x – Dallas Mavericks	43	32	.573	2.5	20‍–‍18	23‍–‍14	10–4	75
pi – Memphis Grizzlies	34	39	.466	10.5	20‍–‍17	14‍–‍22	4–9	73
San Antonio Spurs	32	39	.451	11.5	19‍–‍15	13‍–‍24	7–6	71
New Orleans Pelicans	30	42	.417	14.0	15‍–‍21	15‍–‍21	4–9	72

=== By conference ===
Eastern Conference
#	Team	W	L	PCT	GB	GP
1	z – Milwaukee Bucks *	56	17	.767	–	73
2	y – Toronto Raptors *	53	19	.736	2.5	72
3	x – Boston Celtics	48	24	.667	7.5	72
4	x – Indiana Pacers	45	28	.616	11.0	73
5	y – Miami Heat *	44	29	.603	12.0	73
6	x – Philadelphia 76ers	43	30	.589	13.0	73
7	x – Brooklyn Nets	35	37	.486	20.5	72
8	x – Orlando Magic	33	40	.452	23.0	73
9	Washington Wizards	25	47	.347	30.5	72
10	Charlotte Hornets	23	42	.354	29.0	65
11	Chicago Bulls	22	43	.338	30.0	65
12	New York Knicks	21	45	.318	31.5	66
13	Detroit Pistons	20	46	.303	32.5	66
14	Atlanta Hawks	20	47	.299	33.0	67
15	Cleveland Cavaliers	19	46	.292	33.0	65

Western Conference
#	Team	W	L	PCT	GB	GP
1	c – Los Angeles Lakers *	52	19	.732	–	71
2	x – Los Angeles Clippers	49	23	.681	3.5	72
3	y – Denver Nuggets *	46	27	.630	7.0	73
4	y – Houston Rockets *	44	28	.611	8.5	72
5	x – Oklahoma City Thunder	44	28	.611	8.5	72
6	x – Utah Jazz	44	28	.611	8.5	72
7	x – Dallas Mavericks	43	32	.573	11.0	75
8	x – Portland Trail Blazers	35	39	.473	18.5	74
9	pi – Memphis Grizzlies	34	39	.466	19.0	73
10	Phoenix Suns	34	39	.466	19.0	73
11	San Antonio Spurs	32	39	.451	20.0	71
12	Sacramento Kings	31	41	.431	21.5	72
13	New Orleans Pelicans	30	42	.417	22.5	72
14	Minnesota Timberwolves	19	45	.297	29.5	64
15	Golden State Warriors	15	50	.231	34.0	65

Notes

- z – Clinched home court advantage for the entire playoffs/clinched best record
- c – Clinched home court advantage for the conference playoffs/clinched conference
- y – Clinched division title
- x – Clinched playoff spot
- * – Division winner
- pi - Clinched play-in spot

=== International games ===
The Charlotte Hornets and the Milwaukee Bucks played at the AccorHotels Arena in Paris, France on January 24, 2020, marking the first NBA regular season game in France.

On June 7, 2019, the NBA announced that the Dallas Mavericks, Detroit Pistons, Phoenix Suns, and San Antonio Spurs would play at Mexico City Arena in Mexico City, marking the first time that four NBA teams would play in Mexico City in one regular season. The Mavericks and Pistons played on December 12, 2019, and the Spurs and Suns played on December 14, 2019.

== Play-in tournament ==
Under the plan to restart the season in the NBA Bubble, a possible best-of-three play-in series for the final seed in each conference would be held if the ninth seed finished the regular season within four games of the eighth seed. The eighth seed would start with a de facto 1–0 lead, meaning that it would need just one win to advance, while the ninth seed must win two in a row.

=== Eastern Conference ===
Because eighth-place Orlando (33–40) finished 7 1/2 games ahead ninth-place Washington (25–47), the Magic automatically advanced to the main rounds of the playoffs as the 8th seed in the Eastern Conference, with no play-in contests being necessary there.

=== Western Conference ===
Because eighth-place Portland (35–39) only finished one-half games ahead of ninth-place Memphis (34–39), a play-in was required to determine the 8th seed in the Western Conference.

ABC

August 15

Recap

Memphis Grizzlies 122, Portland Trail Blazers 126
Portland advances to the playoffs as the 8th seed

HP Field House, Bay Lake, Florida

== Playoffs ==
The 2020 NBA playoffs began on August 17 and ended with the NBA Finals, which began on September 30 and ended on October 11.

=== Bracket ===
First round	Conference semifinals
E1	Milwaukee*	4
E8	Orlando	1
E1	Milwaukee*	1
E5	Miami*	4
E4	Indiana	0
E5	Miami*	4
Eastern Conference
E3	Boston	4
E6	Philadelphia	0
E3	Boston	4
E2	Toronto*	3
E2	Toronto*	4
E7	Brooklyn	0
W1	LA Lakers*	4
W8	Portland	1
W1	LA Lakers*	4
W4	Houston*	1
W4	Houston*	4
W5	Oklahoma City	3
Western Conference
W3	Denver*	4
W6	Utah	3
W3	Denver*	4
W2	LA Clippers	3
W2	LA Clippers	4
W7	Dallas	2

Conference finals
E5	Miami*	4
E3	Boston	2
W1	LA Lakers*	4
W3	Denver*	1

NBA Finals
E5	Miami*	2
W1	LA Lakers*	4

- * Division winner
- Bold Series winner

== Death of Kobe Bryant ==
On January 26, 2020, less than four weeks after commissioner emeritus David Stern died from a brain hemorrhage at age 77 on New Year's Day, recently retired Los Angeles Lakers legend Kobe Bryant and his 13-year-old daughter Gianna were tragically killed when the Sikorsky S-76B helicopter that they were on board crashed into a hillside in the city of Calabasas, California, around 30 mi (48 km) northwest of Downtown Los Angeles, while en route from John Wayne Airport to Camarillo Airport. Bryant was 41, the accident left behind no survivors and alongside the Bryants were seven others: baseball coach John Altobelli, his wife Keri, their 14-year-old daughter Alyssa, Sarah Chester, her 13-year-old daughter Payton, basketball coach Christina Mauser, and the pilot, Ara Zobayan.

All occupants were killed on impact and on January 28, Bryant's identity was officially confirmed using fingerprints. The following day, the Los Angeles County Department of Medical Examiner-Coroner stated that the official cause of death for him and the eight others on the helicopter was blunt force trauma. A year later on February 9, 2021, the cause of the crash was officially determined to be Zobayan experiencing spatial disorientation due to heavy fog in the Los Angeles area that morning.

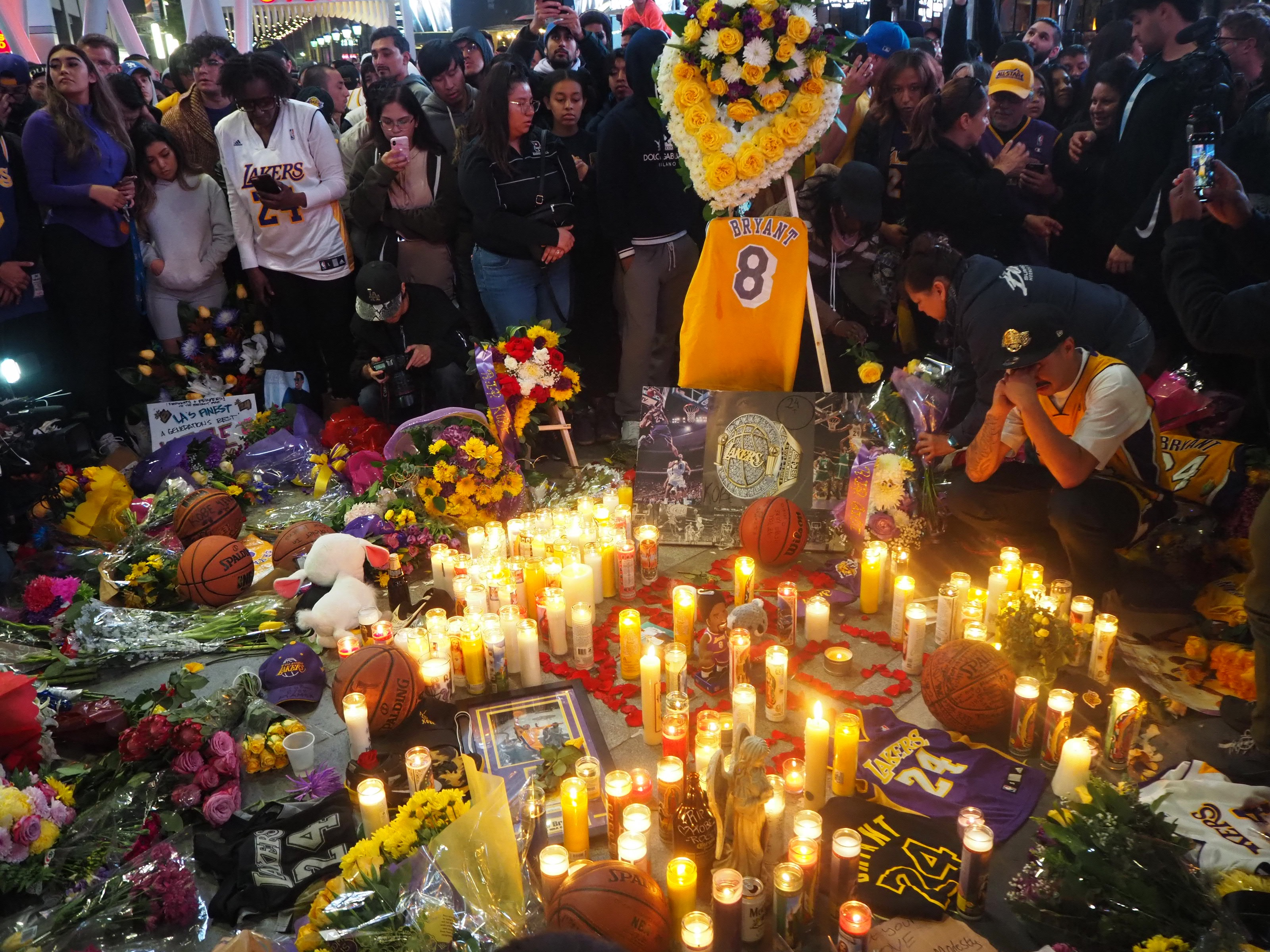
Makeshift memorial at Staples Center on the day of the crash

There were eight NBA games that were scheduled to be played on the day of the accident, the first of which being between the Houston Rockets and Denver Nuggets, as Pepsi Center (now Ball Arena) was the first NBA arena to acknowledge Bryant's death with the Nuggets holding a brief tribute prior to tip-off and concluding the memorial with the message "Rest in Peace, Mamba". Due to that game tipping off just minutes after the news was revealed for the first time, that game went on as scheduled as Denver defeated Houston, 117–110. There were reportedly conversations held among league authorities on whether or not to cancel any of the other games that day. However, each match ultimately went on as planned, partly due to many feeling that Bryant himself would have wanted the games to go on. Of the remaining seven games played that day, beginning with the Toronto Raptors at San Antonio Spurs game, every matchup featured each side intentionally taking either an 8-second violation or a 24-second shot clock violation on their very first possession to start the game, serving as a homage to Bryant's number 8 jersey, which he wore from 1996 to 2006, and his number 24 jersey, which he donned from 2006 to 2016. These violation tributes were initially proposed by Spurs head coach Gregg Popovich and the rest of the league subsequently followed suit throughout the rest of the Sunday and the following several days. Notably, Kyrie Irving, who at the time was a member of the Brooklyn Nets, excused himself and left Madison Square Garden prior to tip-off against the New York Knicks, upon learning of Bryant's death. Irving, who considered Bryant to be a mentor, often trained with Kobe and was and continues to be very close with the Bryant family.

On January 30, the first game at Staples Center since the crash was played, as the Los Angeles Clippers held a tribute to Bryant, his daughter, and the seven other victims of the helicopter crash prior to their home game against the Sacramento Kings. Although decor representing the Lakers were typically covered during Clippers home games, both of Bryant's retired Lakers jerseys were visible in the rafters during a tribute video narrated by Palmdale, California native Paul George.

"Kobe is a brother to me. From the time I was in high school watching him from afar, to getting in this league at 18 and watching him up close, all the battles that we had throughout my career, the one thing that we always shared was that determination to just want to win, to just want to be great. The fact that I'm here now means so much to me. I want to continue, along with my teammates, his legacy. Not only for this year, but for as long as we can play this game of basketball that we love, because that's what Kobe Bryant would want. So in the words of Kobe Bryant, 'Mamba out'. But in the words of us, 'not forgotten'. Live on, brother."

— LeBron James' tribute to Kobe Bryant prior to the Lakers' first game since the tragedy against the Portland Trail Blazers, five days after his death (January 31, 2020)

The previous evening on January 25, LeBron James passed Bryant for third place on the NBA's all-time scoring list during a road loss to the Philadelphia 76ers in Bryant's hometown. James would eventually surpass Kareem Abdul-Jabbar to stand alone as the NBA's all-time leading scorer three years later on February 7, 2023. The Los Angeles Lakers learned of Bryant's death while flying back to Los Angeles from Philadelphia one day following their loss to the 76ers, leaving everyone on board the flight in absolute shock and their January 28 meeting with the crosstown rival Los Angeles Clippers would be postponed the following day. This marked the first time an NBA game was postponed for any reason since nearly seven years earlier when the 2013 Boston Marathon bombing led to the postponement of a Celtics game.

The Lakers did not play a game in the wake of Bryant's death until January 31 when they hosted the Portland Trail Blazers on ESPN. Prior to the commencement of the game, the Lakers conducted a 24-minute long, heavily detailed tribute to Bryant, his daughter and the seven other victims. This tribute began with Usher performing "Amazing Grace" and was capped off by a rendition of The Star-Spangled Banner by Boyz II Men before being concluded with a speech from James, who initially had a monologue prepared, but quickly tossed his index card onto the hardwood after saying "Laker Nation man, I would be selling y'all short if I read off this shit, so I'm going to go straight from the heart", as he proceeded to address a sorrowful Staples Center crowd with an emotional, improvised oration, ending his speech with "...so in the words of Kobe Bryant: 'Mamba out', but in the words of us: 'not forgotten', live on brother". Following the eulogy, each member of the Lakers' starting five would be introduced with Bryant's credentials. Portland won 127–119, in what turned out to be the second most watched NBA broadcast ever in ESPN's history, averaging 4.41 million viewers. The first ever head-to-head meeting between Shaquille O'Neal and Yao Ming in 2003 was the only one with more viewers.

Beginning with the game against Portland, the Lakers added a black logo featuring Bryant's initials to the baseline of their home floor, and a matching commemorative patch to their jerseys. The team also added a number 8 decal to the immediate left of the scorer's table and a number 24 decal to the right of it. The on-court logos remained in place for home games at Staples Center for about six weeks, until the COVID-19 suspension on March 11. The jersey patch continued to be worn for the rest of the season, including through the Orlando bubble with the 2020 NBA playoffs and Finals.

The NBA also renamed the NBA All Star Game MVP Award to the NBA All-Star Game Kobe Bryant Most Valuable Player award, with Kawhi Leonard of the Los Angeles Clippers being the inaugural recipient, who a few days after the crash revealed that he and Bryant shared the same pilot, Ara Zobayan, who also lost his life in the accident. The 2020 NBA All Star Game saw every player on Team LeBron wear the jersey number two for Gianna and every player on Team Giannis wear the jersey number 24 for Kobe. The All Star Game also temporarily changed to an Echelon-style format starting in 2020 with the leading score at the end of the third quarter plus 24 (Bryant's jersey number from 2006 to 2016) acting as the target score. This format would be scrapped however in 2023, with that year's game in Salt Lake City being the final one under this format. The postponed Lakers-Clippers game was originally planned to be made up on April 9, however due to the suspension of the season on March 11, it was made up at the very beginning of the NBA restart on July 30 with the Lakers emerging victorious 103–101.

On February 7, Bryant and his daughter were buried in a private funeral in Pacific View Memorial Park in the Corona del Mar neighborhood of Newport Beach, California. A public memorial service was held on February 24 (2/24, marking both Kobe's and Gianna's jersey numbers) at the Staples Center (now Crypto.com Arena) with Jimmy Kimmel hosting. Speakers at the service included Bryant's widowed wife Vanessa, Michael Jordan, and Shaquille O'Neal, along with Phoenix Mercury guard Diana Taurasi and Geno Auriemma, Taurasi's coach at Connecticut, where Gianna had been aspiring to play.

On October 11, 2020, the Lakers defeated the Miami Heat in Game 6 of the 2020 NBA Finals to capture their 17th championship in franchise history and would dedicate the victory and their season to Bryant.

In his first year of eligibility, Bryant was named a finalist for the Naismith Memorial Basketball Hall of Fame, just less than three weeks after his death, before being posthumously inducted in April 2020. His formal induction was delayed until 2021 due to the COVID-19 pandemic. In October 2021, Bryant was honored as one of the league's greatest players of all time by being named to the NBA 75th Anniversary Team. During the 2022 NBA All-Star Game in Cleveland, he was one of fifteen members of that honorary team to be posthumously lionized during a halftime ceremony dedicated to that 75th Anniversary Team, with the mention of Bryant inducing one of, if not the loudest crowd reaction of the commemoration.

== Suspension of season and restart ==
On March 11, 2020, the game between the Utah Jazz and Oklahoma City Thunder was abruptly postponed shortly before tipoff after it was discovered that the Jazz's player Rudy Gobert tested positive for COVID-19. That same evening, the game between the New Orleans Pelicans and Sacramento Kings was also postponed last minute once it was discovered that a referee for the game, Courtney Kirkland, had worked a Utah Jazz game just two days prior. Kirkland later tested negative for COVID-19. The NBA then suspended the remainder of the 2019–20 season "until further notice" following the completion of games already underway. This was the first time a regular season had been interrupted since the 2011 NBA lockout. The following day, Gobert's teammate Donovan Mitchell also tested positive. On March 14, Detroit Pistons forward Christian Wood became the third NBA player to test positive for the virus, and the first outside of the Jazz. On March 17, four Brooklyn Nets players, including superstar Kevin Durant, tested positive for the virus. On March 19, two players for the Los Angeles Lakers, as well as Marcus Smart of the Boston Celtics, tested positive for COVID-19. All players recovered and were cleared by local health officials.

On May 23, it was announced that the NBA were in negotiations with The Walt Disney Company about the possibility to finish the season at Walt Disney World's ESPN Wide World of Sports Complex in Orlando. On May 29, NBA commissioner Adam Silver and the league office informed board of governors that July 31 was the target date for a season return.

On June 4, the NBA board of governors approved a plan to restart the season on July 31 in Orlando. Under this plan, 13 Western Conference teams and nine Eastern Conference teams, all clubs within six games of a playoff spot, would play eight regular-season "seeding" games. Play-in games for the eighth seed in each conference would then be held if the ninth seed finishes the regular season within four games of the eighth seed. This proposal was then approved by members of the National Basketball Players Association on June 5.

== Players boycott ==
On August 26, 2020, the Milwaukee Bucks chose not to play in game 5 of the playoff series against the Orlando Magic to protest the police shooting of Jacob Blake. The NBA and the National Basketball Players Association announced that, in light of the Milwaukee Bucks striking for their game, the following games of the day would be postponed. The Toronto Raptors had also discussed striking for their second-round playoff series with the Boston Celtics in frustration with a lack of social or legislative change after the murder of George Floyd and as a result of Blake's shooting before the Bucks' strike a few days later.

== Medical protocol for season restart ==
On June 16, 2020, the NBA released a medical protocol to be used during the season restart in the NBA Bubble at Walt Disney World to ensure the health and safety of players, coaches, officials, and staff. This included regular testing for COVID-19 prior to and throughout the season restart, wearing a face covering or mask, and social distancing to prevent an outbreak of COVID-19 from occurring. Players and coaches who were deemed "high-risk individuals" by their team, or players who had already suffered season-ending injuries prior to season suspension, were not permitted to play and also did not lose any salary. Any player who was medically cleared could also decline to participate, but as a result lost their corresponding paychecks.

Phase 1 of the plan ran from June 16 to 22, consisting of players traveling back to the home cities of their respective teams. In Phase 2 from June 23 to 30, COVID-19 tests began being administered to players every other day. In Phase 3 from July 1 to 11, mandatory individual workouts were conducted at team facilities, but group workouts were prohibited.

Phase 4 ran from July 7 to 21, consisting of the teams traveling to Disney World and conducting practices. Any player who tested positive in the previous phases could not travel until he was medically cleared to do so. Once teams arrive in Orlando, players and staff were isolated in their rooms, requiring to pass two polymerase chain reaction (PCR) tests 24 hours apart before being let out of this quarantine. They were still regularly tested for COVID-19 afterwards. A player who tested positive would be isolated and re-tested in case of a false positive; if COVID-19 was definitely confirmed, he would be quarantined for at least 14 days to recover.

Players and staff were not permitted into another's room, nor were they be able to socialize with players on other teams staying at a different hotel building. They had access to food and recreational activities within their hotel's bubble, but they had to wear masks indoors except when eating. Anybody who left the bubble without prior approval had to be quarantined for at least 10 days.

During Phase 5 from July 22 to 29, teams played three scrimmages against the other teams staying at the same hotel. During Phase 6, when the regular-season seeding games and playoffs were under way and teams began to be eliminated from contention, players and staff on those clubs had to pass one final COVID-19 test before they could leave Disney World.

The NBA also set up an anonymous hotline for players to report protocol violations while in the bubble.

== Statistics ==
=== Individual statistic leaders ===
Category	Player	Team(s)	Statistic
Points per game	James Harden	Houston Rockets	34.3
Rebounds per game	Andre Drummond	Detroit/Cleveland	15.2
Assists per game	LeBron James	Los Angeles Lakers	10.2
Steals per game	Ben Simmons	Philadelphia 76ers	2.1
Blocks per game	Hassan Whiteside	Portland Trail Blazers	2.9
Turnovers per game	Trae Young	Atlanta Hawks	4.8
Fouls per game	Jaren Jackson Jr.	Memphis Grizzlies	4.1
Minutes per game	Damian Lillard	Portland Trail Blazers	37.5
FG%	Mitchell Robinson	New York Knicks	74.2%
FT%	Brad Wanamaker	Boston Celtics	92.6%
3FG%	George Hill	Milwaukee Bucks	46.0%
Efficiency per game	Giannis Antetokounmpo	Milwaukee Bucks	34.6
Double-doubles	Giannis Antetokounmpo	Milwaukee Bucks	56
Triple-doubles	Luka Dončić	Dallas Mavericks	17

=== Individual game highs ===
Category	Player	Team	Statistic
Points	Damian Lillard	Portland Trail Blazers	61
Rebounds	Jonas Valančiūnas	Memphis Grizzlies	25
Assists	LeBron James	Los Angeles Lakers	19
Assists	Luka Dončić	Dallas Mavericks	19
Steals	Ben Simmons	Philadelphia 76ers	7
Steals	Fred VanVleet	Toronto Raptors	7
Steals	Jonathan Isaac	Orlando Magic	7
Steals	Elfrid Payton	New York Knicks	7
Steals	Dennis Smith Jr.	New York Knicks	7
Steals	Ricky Rubio	Phoenix Suns	7
Steals	OG Anunoby	Toronto Raptors	7
Blocks	Hassan Whiteside	Portland Trail Blazers	10
Three-pointers	Zach LaVine	Chicago Bulls	13

=== Team statistic leaders ===
Category	Team	Statistic
Points per game	Milwaukee Bucks	118.7
Rebounds per game	Milwaukee Bucks	51.7
Assists per game	Phoenix Suns	27.2
Steals per game	Chicago Bulls	10.0
Blocks per game	Los Angeles Lakers	6.6
Turnovers per game	San Antonio Spurs	12.6
FG%	Los Angeles Lakers	48.0%
FT%	Phoenix Suns	83.4%
3FG%	Utah Jazz	38.0%
+/−	Milwaukee Bucks	+10.1

== Awards ==
=== Yearly awards ===
While the statistics from the seeding games were counted towards players' regular season totals, the NBA ruled that its end-of-season awards were only based on games through March 11 and excluded the seeding games. Finalist for the major awards were announced during the seeding games. Due to the pandemic, the NBA Awards show held the prior three years was cancelled, and award winners were instead announced on TNT during their coverage of the 2020 playoffs.

2019–20 NBA awards
Award	Recipient(s)	Finalists
Most Valuable Player	Giannis Antetokounmpo (Milwaukee Bucks)	James Harden (Houston Rockets); LeBron James (Los Angeles Lakers)
Defensive Player of the Year	Giannis Antetokounmpo (Milwaukee Bucks)	Anthony Davis (Los Angeles Lakers); Rudy Gobert (Utah Jazz)
Rookie of the Year	Ja Morant (Memphis Grizzlies)	Kendrick Nunn (Miami Heat); Zion Williamson (New Orleans Pelicans)
Sixth Man of the Year	Montrezl Harrell (Los Angeles Clippers)	Dennis Schröder (Oklahoma City Thunder); Lou Williams (Los Angeles Clippers)
Most Improved Player	Brandon Ingram (New Orleans Pelicans)	Bam Adebayo (Miami Heat); Luka Dončić (Dallas Mavericks)
Coach of the Year	Nick Nurse (Toronto Raptors)	Mike Budenholzer (Milwaukee Bucks); Billy Donovan (Oklahoma City Thunder)
Executive of the Year	Lawrence Frank (Los Angeles Clippers)	Sam Presti (Oklahoma City Thunder); Pat Riley (Miami Heat)
NBA Sportsmanship Award	Vince Carter (Atlanta Hawks)	Steven Adams (Oklahoma City Thunder); Harrison Barnes (Sacramento Kings); Langston Galloway (Detroit Pistons); Tyus Jones (Memphis Grizzlies); Garrett Temple (Brooklyn Nets)
J. Walter Kennedy Citizenship Award	Malcolm Brogdon (Indiana Pacers)	Jrue Holiday (New Orleans Pelicans); Kevin Love (Cleveland Cavaliers); Josh Okogie (Minnesota Timberwolves); Lloyd Pierce (Atlanta Hawks)
Twyman–Stokes Teammate of the Year Award	Jrue Holiday (New Orleans Pelicans)	Tobias Harris (Philadelphia 76ers); Kyle Korver (Milwaukee Bucks)
Community Assist Award	Harrison Barnes (Sacramento Kings); Jaylen Brown (Boston Celtics); George Hill (Milwaukee Bucks); Chris Paul (Oklahoma City Thunder); Dwight Powell (Dallas Mavericks)	—

- All-NBA First Team:
  - F Giannis Antetokounmpo, Milwaukee Bucks
  - F LeBron James, Los Angeles Lakers
  - C Anthony Davis, Los Angeles Lakers
  - G Luka Dončić, Dallas Mavericks
  - G James Harden, Houston Rockets
- All-NBA Second Team:
  - F Kawhi Leonard, Los Angeles Clippers
  - F Pascal Siakam, Toronto Raptors
  - C Nikola Jokić, Denver Nuggets
  - G Chris Paul, Oklahoma City Thunder
  - G Damian Lillard, Portland Trail Blazers
- All-NBA Third Team:
  - F Jayson Tatum, Boston Celtics
  - F Jimmy Butler, Miami Heat
  - C Rudy Gobert, Utah Jazz
  - G Ben Simmons, Philadelphia 76ers
  - G Russell Westbrook, Houston Rockets

- NBA All-Defensive First Team:
  - F Giannis Antetokounmpo, Milwaukee Bucks
  - F Anthony Davis, Los Angeles Lakers
  - C Rudy Gobert, Utah Jazz
  - G Ben Simmons, Philadelphia 76ers
  - G Marcus Smart, Boston Celtics
- NBA All-Defensive Second Team:
  - F Bam Adebayo, Miami Heat
  - F Kawhi Leonard, Los Angeles Clippers
  - C Brook Lopez, Milwaukee Bucks
  - G Eric Bledsoe, Milwaukee Bucks
  - G Patrick Beverley, Los Angeles Clippers

- NBA All-Rookie First Team:
  - Ja Morant, Memphis Grizzlies
  - Kendrick Nunn, Miami Heat
  - Brandon Clarke, Memphis Grizzlies
  - Zion Williamson, New Orleans Pelicans
  - Eric Paschall, Golden State Warriors
- NBA All-Rookie Second Team:
  - Tyler Herro, Miami Heat
  - Terence Davis, Toronto Raptors
  - Coby White, Chicago Bulls
  - P. J. Washington, Charlotte Hornets
  - Rui Hachimura, Washington Wizards

=== Players of the Week ===
The following players were named the Eastern and Western Conference Players of the Week.

Week	Eastern Conference	Western Conference	Ref
October 22–27	Trae Young (Atlanta Hawks) (1/1)	Karl-Anthony Towns (Minnesota Timberwolves) (1/1)	
October 28 – November 3	Giannis Antetokounmpo (Milwaukee Bucks) (1/4)	Anthony Davis (Los Angeles Lakers) (1/2)	
November 4–10	Pascal Siakam (Toronto Raptors) (1/2)	James Harden (Houston Rockets) (1/2)	
November 11–17	Nikola Vučević (Orlando Magic) (1/1)	James Harden (Houston Rockets) (2/2)	
November 18–24	Spencer Dinwiddie (Brooklyn Nets) (1/1)	Luka Dončić (Dallas Mavericks) (1/1)	
November 25 – December 1	Giannis Antetokounmpo (Milwaukee Bucks) (2/4)	Carmelo Anthony (Portland Trail Blazers) (1/1)	
December 2–8	Jimmy Butler (Miami Heat) (1/1)	Anthony Davis (Los Angeles Lakers) (2/2)	
December 9–15	Bam Adebayo (Miami Heat) (1/1)	LeBron James (Los Angeles Lakers) (1/3)	
December 16–22	Kyle Lowry (Toronto Raptors) (1/1)	Dennis Schröder (Oklahoma City Thunder) (1/1)	
December 23–29	Jaylen Brown (Boston Celtics) (1/2)	Brandon Ingram (New Orleans Pelicans) (1/1)	
December 30 – January 5	Giannis Antetokounmpo (Milwaukee Bucks) (3/4)	LeBron James (Los Angeles Lakers) (2/3)	
January 6–12	Josh Richardson (Philadelphia 76ers) (1/1)	DeMar DeRozan (San Antonio Spurs) (1/1)	
January 13–19	Ben Simmons (Philadelphia 76ers) (1/1)	Kawhi Leonard (Los Angeles Clippers) (1/1)	
January 20–26	Pascal Siakam (Toronto Raptors) (2/2)	Damian Lillard (Portland Trail Blazers) (1/2)	
January 27 – February 2	Jaylen Brown (Boston Celtics) (2/2)	Damian Lillard (Portland Trail Blazers) (2/2)	
February 3–9	Jayson Tatum (Boston Celtics) (1/1)	Nikola Jokić (Denver Nuggets) (1/1)	
February 24 – March 1	Giannis Antetokounmpo (Milwaukee Bucks) (4/4)	Kristaps Porziņģis (Dallas Mavericks) (1/1)	
March 2–8	Norman Powell (Toronto Raptors) (1/1)	LeBron James (Los Angeles Lakers) (3/3)	

=== Players of the Month ===
The following players were named the Eastern and Western Conference Players of the Month.

Month	Eastern Conference	Western Conference	Ref
October/November	Giannis Antetokounmpo (Milwaukee Bucks) (1/3)	Luka Dončić (Dallas Mavericks) (1/1)	
December	Giannis Antetokounmpo (Milwaukee Bucks) (2/3)	James Harden (Houston Rockets) (1/1)	
January	Giannis Antetokounmpo (Milwaukee Bucks) (3/3)	LeBron James (Los Angeles Lakers) (1/2)	
February	Jayson Tatum (Boston Celtics) (1/1)	LeBron James (Los Angeles Lakers) (2/2)	

=== Rookies of the Month ===
The following players were named the Eastern and Western Conference Rookies of the Month.

Month	Eastern Conference	Western Conference	Ref
October/November	Kendrick Nunn (Miami Heat) (1/3)	Ja Morant (Memphis Grizzlies) (1/3)	
December	Kendrick Nunn (Miami Heat) (2/3)	Ja Morant (Memphis Grizzlies) (2/3)	
January	Kendrick Nunn (Miami Heat) (3/3)	Ja Morant (Memphis Grizzlies) (3/3)	
February	Coby White (Chicago Bulls) (1/1)	Zion Williamson (New Orleans Pelicans) (1/1)	

=== Coaches of the Month ===
The following coaches were named the Eastern and Western Conference Coaches of the Month.

Month	Eastern Conference	Western Conference	Ref
October/November	Nick Nurse (Toronto Raptors) (1/2)	Frank Vogel (Los Angeles Lakers) (1/1)	
December	Mike Budenholzer (Milwaukee Bucks) (1/2)	Billy Donovan (Oklahoma City Thunder) (1/1)	
January	Nick Nurse (Toronto Raptors) (2/2)	Taylor Jenkins (Memphis Grizzlies) (1/1)	
February	Mike Budenholzer (Milwaukee Bucks) (2/2)	Mike D'Antoni (Houston Rockets) (1/1)	

=== Seeding games ===
Awards for seeding games play were also announced, with Damian Lillard named Player of the Seeding Games after averaging 37.6 points per game.

Seeding Games awards
Award	Recipient(s)
Player of the Seeding Games	Damian Lillard (Portland Trail Blazers)
Coach of the Seeding Games	Monty Williams (Phoenix Suns)
All-Seeding Games First Team	Devin Booker (Phoenix Suns)
All-Seeding Games First Team	Luka Dončić (Dallas Mavericks)
All-Seeding Games First Team	James Harden (Houston Rockets)
All-Seeding Games First Team	Damian Lillard (Portland Trail Blazers)
All-Seeding Games First Team	T. J. Warren (Indiana Pacers)
All-Seeding Games Second Team	Giannis Antetokounmpo (Milwaukee Bucks)
All-Seeding Games Second Team	Kawhi Leonard (Los Angeles Clippers)
All-Seeding Games Second Team	Caris LeVert (Brooklyn Nets)
All-Seeding Games Second Team	Michael Porter Jr. (Denver Nuggets)
All-Seeding Games Second Team	Kristaps Porziņģis (Dallas Mavericks)

== Arenas ==
- This was the Golden State Warriors' first season at the new Chase Center in San Francisco after playing at Oracle Arena in Oakland from 1971 to 2019. The Warriors played their first game there in a preseason game against the Los Angeles Lakers on October 5, 2019. They played their first regular season game there against the Los Angeles Clippers on October 24, 2019, where they lost 141–122.
- The Cleveland Cavaliers' home arena, formerly known as Quicken Loans Arena, was renamed Rocket Mortgage FieldHouse on April 9, 2019.

== Media ==
This was the fourth year of a nine-year deal with ABC, ESPN, TNT and NBA TV.

Under an agreement with the U.S. Department of Justice regarding Disney's acquisition of 21st Century Fox, the Fox Sports Regional Networks were required to be sold off to third parties by June 18, 2019. Fox also invoked a clause to give Yankee Global Enterprises the rights to buy their stake back in the YES Network, which aired the local broadcasts to the NBA's Brooklyn Nets. Including YES, the Fox Sports Regional Networks held the local TV rights to a combined total of 44 NHL, NBA, and MLB teams. On March 8, YES was sold to a consortium including Yankee Global Enterprises, Amazon, and Sinclair Broadcast Group for $3.5 billion. Then on May 3, Sinclair and Entertainment Studios agreed to purchase the rest of the Fox Sports Regional Networks. The networks continued to temporarily use the Fox Sports name under a transitional license agreement while Sinclair explored re-branding options.

== Notable occurrences ==
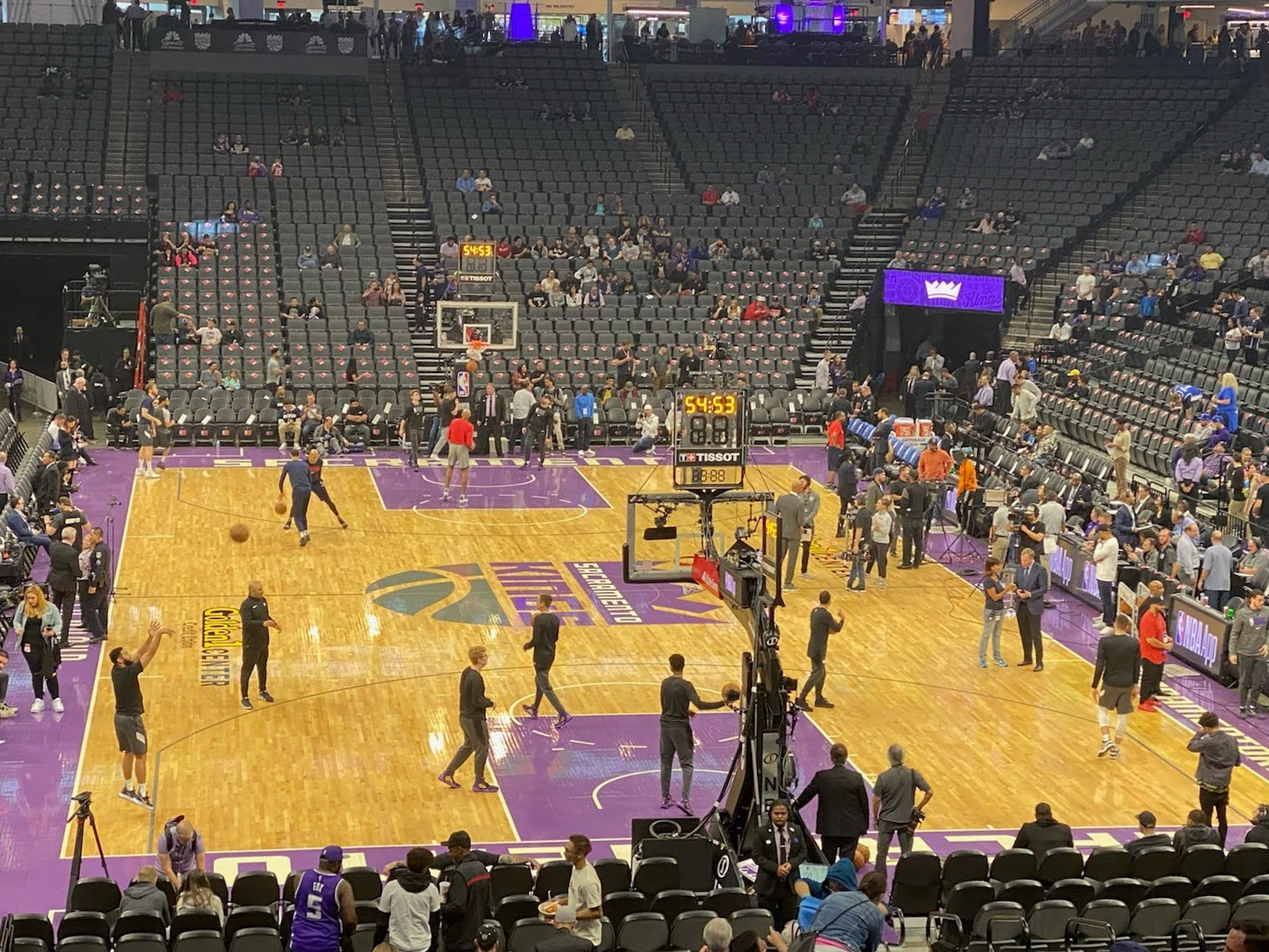
The Golden 1 Center being emptied on March 11, 2020, after the game between the Sacramento Kings and the New Orleans Pelicans was postponed due to COVID-19

- On October 23, 2019, Kyrie Irving of the Brooklyn Nets set the record for most points (50) in debut game with a new team.
- On October 24, 2019, Vince Carter of the Atlanta Hawks became the first player in NBA history to play 22 seasons. Carter officially checked in the game at 6:52 in the first quarter against the Detroit Pistons.
- On October 29, 2019, Anthony Davis set the record for most free throws made (18) in a quarter
- On November 3, 2019, Luka Dončić of the Dallas Mavericks became the youngest player to record consecutive 25-point triple-doubles.
- On November 19, 2019, LeBron James of the Los Angeles Lakers became the first player in NBA history to record a triple-double against all 30 NBA teams.
- On November 25, 2019, Carmelo Anthony of the Portland Trail Blazers passed Alex English for 18th on the NBA all-time scoring list.
- On November 27, 2019, LeBron James became the fourth player in NBA history to reach 33,000 career points.
- On December 3, 2019, James Harden set a record for the most free throws made (24) in a game with no misses
- On December 8, 2019, Luka Dončić surpassed the record for the most consecutive games with at least 20 points, 5 rebounds and 5 assists since the ABA-NBA merger in 1976. Michael Jordan previously held the record, recording 18 consecutive games with at least 20–5–5 between March 13, 1989, and April 4, 1989.
- On December 10, 2019, Vince Carter became the fifth player in NBA history to play at least 1,500 games.
- On December 14, 2019, James Harden became the first player to record back-to-back 50-point games with more than 10 three-pointers
- On December 28, 2019, Jrue Holiday of the New Orleans Pelicans, in addition to Justin Holiday and Aaron Holiday of the Indiana Pacers, became the first three brothers to play in the same NBA game.
- On December 29, 2019, LeBron James became the first player in NBA history to record at least 30,000 points, 9,000 rebounds and 9,000 assists.
- On January 1, 2020, NBA Commissioner Emeritus David Stern died at the age of 77, due to a brain hemorrhage sustained a few weeks prior. For the remainder of the season, all thirty teams wore a black stripe of fabric on the left side of their jerseys in memory of Stern.
- On January 4, 2020, Vince Carter became the only player in NBA history to have played in four different decades.
- On January 13, 2020, Shai Gilgeous-Alexander of the Oklahoma City Thunder became the youngest player in NBA history to record a 20-rebound triple-double at 21 years and 185 days old.
- On January 15, 2020, Chandler Parsons of the Atlanta Hawks was hit by a drunk driver, suffering potentially career-ending injuries.
- On January 17, 2020, Carmelo Anthony of the Portland Trail Blazers became the 18th player in NBA history to reach 26,000 points.
- On January 20, 2020, Russell Westbrook of the Houston Rockets became the second player to record a triple-double against all 30 NBA teams.
- On January 22, 2020, Vince Carter moved past Alex English for 19th on the NBA all-time scoring list.
- On January 25, 2020, LeBron James moved past Kobe Bryant for 3rd on the NBA all-time scoring list.
- On January 26, 2020, a day after being passed by LeBron James for 3rd on the NBA's all-time scoring list, Kobe Bryant and his daughter Gianna died in a helicopter crash in Calabasas, California. During the first minute of each game for this day (outside of the first matchup of the day between the Denver Nuggets and Houston Rockets, which tipped off just minutes after news of the tragedy had broken), players paid tribute by dribbling through the 24-second shot clock violation and the 8-second backcourt violation, referencing the two numbers Bryant wore during his career. In addition to this, the 2020 NBA All-Star Game was played with jersey numbers 24 and 2, the latter to pay tribute to Gianna.
- On January 27, the NBA announced that they would postpone the January 28 game between the Los Angeles Lakers and Los Angeles Clippers at Staples Center out of respect to Bryant, marking the first time an NBA game was postponed for any reason since the 2013 Boston Marathon bombing led to the postponement of a Celtics game. The game was later originally rescheduled for April 9, but was eventually played as the first game of the NBA restart on July 30 following the suspension of play due to the coronavirus pandemic.
- On January 29, 2020, Carmelo Anthony moved past Kevin Garnett for 17th on the NBA all-time scoring list.
- On January 31, 2020, Vince Carter moved up to third place in the NBA all-time games played list with 1,523 passing Dirk Nowitzki in the process.
- On February 23, 2020, the Milwaukee Bucks clinched the earliest playoff berth with their 137–134 win over the Washington Wizards.
- On March 1, 2020, Shake Milton tied the record for most consecutive 3-point field goals made (13) over a span of three games; Brent Price and Terry Mills did as well
- On March 11, 2020, the league suspended the season indefinitely after Utah Jazz center Rudy Gobert tested positive for COVID-19, just hours after the WHO declared the disease a pandemic on the same day. Gobert's positive test causes a massive ripple effect, causing a shutdown of the vast majority of the sports world within five days. Vince Carter played in what became his final game, hitting a three-pointer as his final shot in a 136–131 overtime loss to the New York Knicks.
- On June 4, the NBA board of governors approved 29–1 (with the lone dissenter being the Portland Trail Blazers) resuming the 2019–20 season in Orlando, Florida, at Walt Disney World, after prior consideration of Las Vegas and Houston as potential spots.
- On June 16, 2020, the NBA released a medical protocol to be used during the season restart in the bubble to ensure the health and safety of players, coaches, officials, and staff.
- On June 25, 2020, Vince Carter officially announced his retirement after 22 seasons and four separate decades in the NBA. He is the only player to accomplish both these feats.
- On July 30, 2020, the regular season resumed in the NBA bubble.
- On August 8, 2020, Luka Dončić recorded his 17th triple-double of the season, clinching his spot as the youngest player to ever lead the NBA in triple-doubles in a season.
- On August 10, 2020, Carmelo Anthony moved past John Havlicek and Paul Pierce, respectively, for 16th and 15th on the NBA all-time scoring list.
- On August 13, 2020, the San Antonio Spurs were eliminated from playoff contention, ending an NBA record-tying 22-year streak.
- On August 17, 2020, Donovan Mitchell scored 57 points, the third highest in NBA single-game playoff history, against the Denver Nuggets in game 1 of their playoff series.
- On August 23, 2020, Luka Dončić's performance in game 4 of the Dallas Mavericks playoff series against the Los Angeles Clippers, including 43 points, 17 rebounds, 13 assists, and a game-winning buzzer beater, broke a number of records. He became the youngest player to hit a game-winning buzzer beater in the playoffs, one of only three players to make 40-plus points, 15-plus rebounds, and 10-plus assists in a playoff game, one of only five players to make 40-plus points including a buzzer beater in a playoff game, first Dallas Maverick to have a triple-double in the playoffs, among others.
- On August 23, 2020, Donovan Mitchell scored 51 points and Jamal Murray scored 50 points in a playoff game between the Utah Jazz and the Denver Nuggets, the first time in NBA history that two players scored 50 points in a playoff game.
- On August 26, 2020, the Milwaukee Bucks decided to boycott Game 5 of their First Round series against the Orlando Magic in order to protest the shooting of Jacob Blake a few days prior. Similar decisions by the Oklahoma City Thunder, Houston Rockets, Portland Trail Blazers, and Los Angeles Lakers came shortly after.
- On September 15, 2020, the Denver Nuggets defeated the Los Angeles Clippers in the Western Conference semifinals after initially trailing in the series 3–1. This marked the first time that a team overcame consecutive 3–1 series deficits in a single playoff run, as the Nuggets had previously overcome a 3–1 series deficit to win their first round series against the Utah Jazz.
- On October 11, 2020, Talen Horton-Tucker became the second-youngest NBA player to win an NBA championship after the Los Angeles Lakers beat the Miami Heat 106–93 to win the 2020 NBA Finals.
- Tony Snell had the first 50-50-100 season (min. 100 attempts) in NBA history
- James Harden became the third player, after Michael Jordan and Allen Iverson, to lead the league in total points and total steals in the same season

== See also ==
- COVID-19 pandemic in Canada
- COVID-19 pandemic in the United States
- Impact of the COVID-19 pandemic on basketball
- List of NBA regular season records
