= List of NBA franchise postseason streaks =

This is a list of National Basketball Association (NBA) franchise post-season appearance streaks. This list includes the all-time and the active consecutive playoffs appearance. Aside from the NBA Playoff appearance streaks, this list also includes the NBA Finals appearance streak and the NBA championships win streak.

On March 24, 1971, the Philadelphia 76ers (formerly known as the Syracuse Nationals) set an NBA record of 22 consecutive playoff appearances in the time between the 1950 NBA playoffs and the 1971 NBA playoffs. The 76ers won two NBA championships during their streak. In 2019 the San Antonio Spurs tied the NBA record of 22 consecutive playoff appearances. The Spurs' streak started in the 1998 NBA playoffs and ended after missing the 2020 NBA playoffs. The Spurs won five NBA championships during their streak.

The Boston Celtics hold the longest consecutive NBA Finals appearance streak with ten appearances between 1957 and 1966. During the streak, the Celtics won eight consecutive NBA championships—also an NBA record.

== Active streaks ==
=== NBA Playoffs appearance streaks ===
This is a list of teams that have active and current consecutive seasons with a playoff appearance.

^	Longest streak in team history

2026 Playoff Teams
Streak	Team	NBA Playoffs appearance streak	NBA championships won during streak	Reference
12	Boston Celtics	2015–2026	1 (2024)	
8	Denver Nuggets	2019–2026	1 (2023)	
5	Minnesota Timberwolves	2022–2026	—	
4	Cleveland Cavaliers	2023–2026	—	
4	Los Angeles Lakers	2023–2026	—	
4	New York Knicks	2023–2026	1 (2026)	
3	Oklahoma City Thunder	2024–2026	1 (2025)	
3	Orlando Magic	2024–2026	—	
2	Detroit Pistons	2025–2026	—	
2	Houston Rockets	2025–2026	—	
1	Atlanta Hawks	2026	—	
1	Philadelphia 76ers	2026	—	
1	Phoenix Suns	2026	—	
1	Portland Trail Blazers	2026	—	
1	San Antonio Spurs	2026	—	
1	Toronto Raptors	2026	—	

=== NBA Playoffs series win streaks ===
This is a list of teams that have active and current consecutive seasons with a playoff series win.

List updated through the 2026 playoffs.

^	Longest streak in team history
~	Tied for longest streak in team history

Consecutive seasons with a series win
Streak	Team	NBA Playoffs series win streak	NBA championships won during streak	Reference
4	New York Knicks	2023–2026	1 (2026)	
3	Cleveland Cavaliers	2024–2026	—	
3	Minnesota Timberwolves^	2024–2026	—	
3	Oklahoma City Thunder	2024–2026	1 (2025)	
1	Detroit Pistons	2026	—	
1	Los Angeles Lakers	2026	—	
1	Philadelphia 76ers	2026	—	
1	San Antonio Spurs	2026	—	

== All-time streaks ==
=== NBA Playoffs appearance streaks ===
Appearance streaks updated through the 2026 NBA playoffs.

^	Denotes active streak

Streak	Team	NBA Playoffs appearance streak	NBA championships won during streak	Reference
22	Syracuse Nationals; Philadelphia 76ers	1950–1963; 1964–1971	2 (1955, 1967)	
22	San Antonio Spurs	1998–2019	5 (1999, 2003, 2005, 2007, 2014)	
21	Portland Trail Blazers	1983–2003	—	
20	Utah Jazz	1984–2003	—	
19	Boston Celtics	1951–1969	11 (1957, 1959–1966, 1968, 1969)	
17	Los Angeles Lakers	1977–1993	5 (1980, 1982, 1985, 1987, 1988)	
16	Minneapolis Lakers; Los Angeles Lakers	1959–1960; 1961–1974	1 (1972)	
14	Fort Wayne Pistons; Detroit Pistons	1950–1957; 1958–1963	—	
14	Boston Celtics	1980–1993	3 (1981, 1984, 1986)	
14	Chicago Bulls	1985–1998	6 (1991–1993, 1996–1998)	
14	New York Knicks	1988–2001	—	
13	Phoenix Suns	1989–2001	—	
12	Baltimore Bullets; Capitol Bullets; Washington Bullets	1969–1973; 1974; 1975–1980	1 (1978)	
12	Philadelphia 76ers	1976–1987	1 (1983)	
12	Milwaukee Bucks	1980–1991	—	
12	Dallas Mavericks	2001–2012	1 (2011)	
12	Boston Celtics^	2015–2026	1 (2024)	
11	St. Louis Hawks; Atlanta Hawks	1963–1968; 1969–1973	—	
10	Los Angeles Lakers	1995–2004	3 (2000, 2001, 2002)	
10	Denver Nuggets	2004–2013	—	
10	Atlanta Hawks	2008–2017	—	

=== Longest post-season streaks in team history ===
Updated through 2026 NBA playoffs.

^	Denotes active streak

Team	Longest streak with post-season appearances	Seasons	Reference
Philadelphia 76ers	1950–1971	22	
San Antonio Spurs	1998–2019	22	
Portland Trail Blazers	1983–2003	21	
Utah Jazz	1984–2003	20	
Boston Celtics	1951–1969	19	
Los Angeles Lakers	1977–1993	17	
Detroit Pistons	1950–1963	14	
Chicago Bulls	1985–1998	14	
New York Knicks	1988–2001	14	
Phoenix Suns	1989–2001	13	
Washington Wizards	1969–1980	12	
Milwaukee Bucks	1980–1991	12	
Dallas Mavericks	2001–2012	12	
Atlanta Hawks	1963–1973	11	
Denver Nuggets	2004–2013	10	
Indiana Pacers	1998–2006	9	
Oklahoma City Thunder	1991–1998	8	
Minnesota Timberwolves	1997–2004	8	
Sacramento Kings	1999–2006	8	
Houston Rockets	2013–2020	8	
Memphis Grizzlies	2011–2017	7	
Golden State Warriors	2013–2019	7	
Toronto Raptors	2014–2020	7	
Brooklyn Nets	2002–2007	6	
Orlando Magic	2007–2012	6	
Los Angeles Clippers	2012–2017	6	
Miami Heat	1996–2001; 2009–2014; 2020–2025	6	
Cleveland Cavaliers	1992–1996; 2006–2010	5	
Charlotte Hornets	2000–2002	3	
New Orleans Pelicans	2003–2004; 2008–2009	2	

=== Longest post-season series win streaks in team history ===
Updated through 2026 NBA playoffs.

^	Denotes active streak

Team	Year streak started	Year streak ended	Seasons
Boston Celtics	1957	1988	28^{[a]}
Chicago Bulls	1988	1998	11
Los Angeles Lakers	1982	1991	10
New York Knicks	1992	2000	9
Cleveland Cavaliers	2006	2018	9^{[b]}
San Antonio Spurs	2001	2008	8
Golden State Warriors	2015	active	8^{[c]}
Philadelphia 76ers	1977	1983	7
Detroit Pistons	2002	2008	7
Milwaukee Bucks	1983	1987	5
Houston Rockets	1993	1997	5
Utah Jazz	1996	2000	5
Miami Heat	2011	2016	5^{[d]}
Oklahoma City Thunder	2011	2016	5^{[d]}
Toronto Raptors	2016	2020	5
Atlanta Hawks	1960	1964	4^{[e]}
Phoenix Suns	1992	1995	4
Sacramento Kings	2001	2004	4
Portland Trail Blazers	1990	1992	3
Dallas Mavericks	2001	2003	3
Brooklyn Nets	2002	2004	3
Orlando Magic	2008	2010	3
Indiana Pacers	1998; 2012	2000; 2014	3
Denver Nuggets	2019; 2023	2021; 2025	3
Washington Wizards	1977; 2014	1979; 2017	3^{[f]}
Minnesota Timberwolves	2024	active	3
Charlotte Hornets	2001	2002	2
Los Angeles Clippers	2006; 2014; 2020	2012; 2015; 2021	2^{[g]}
Memphis Grizzlies	2011; 2013; 2015; 2022		1
New Orleans Pelicans	2008; 2018		1

- ^{a} Missed playoffs in 1970, 1971, 1978 and 1979.
- ^{b} Missed playoffs from 2011 to 2014.
- ^{c} Missed playoffs in 2020, 2021, 2024 and 2026.
- ^{d} Missed playoffs in 2015.
- ^{e} Missed playoffs in 1962.
- ^{f} During the second streak, the Wizards missed the playoffs in 2016.
- ^{g} During the first streak, the Clippers missed the playoffs from 2007 to 2011.

=== NBA Conference Finals appearance streaks ===
Appearance streaks up to the 2026 NBA playoffs. Includes both the NBA conference finals, introduced in 1971, and its predecessor division finals.

^	Denotes active streak

Streak	Team	NBA Conference Finals appearance streak	Conference titles won during streak	Reference
13	Boston Celtics	1957–1969	12 (1957–1966, 1968, 1969)	
8	Los Angeles Lakers	1982–1989	7 (1982–1985, 1987–1989)	
7	Minneapolis Lakers	1949–1955	5 (1949, 1950, 1952–1954)	
6	St. Louis Hawks	1956–1961	4 (1957, 1958, 1960, 1961)	
6	Los Angeles Lakers	1968–1973	5 (1968–1970, 1972, 1973)	
6	New York Knicks	1969–1974	3 (1970, 1972, 1973)	
6	Detroit Pistons	2003–2008	2 (2004, 2005)	
5	New York Knicks	1949–1953	3 (1951–1953)	
5	Minneapolis/Los Angeles Lakers	1959–1963	3 (1959, 1962, 1963)	
5	Boston Celtics	1972–1976	2 (1974, 1976)	
5	Boston Celtics	1984–1988	4 (1984–1986)	
5	Detroit Pistons	1987–1991	3 (1988–1990)	
5	Chicago Bulls	1989–1993	3 (1991–1993)	
5	Golden State Warriors	2015–2019	5 (2015–2019)	
4	Syracuse Nationals	1954–1957	2 (1954, 1955)	
4	Philadelphia 76ers	1965–1968	1 (1967)	
4	Philadelphia 76ers	1980–1983	3 (1980, 1982, 1983)	
4	Miami Heat	2011–2014	4 (2011–2014)	
4	Cleveland Cavaliers	2015–2018	4 (2015–2018)	

=== NBA Finals appearance streaks ===
Appearance streaks updated through 2025 NBA playoffs.

^	Denotes active streak

Streak	Team	NBA Finals appearance streak	NBA championships won during streak	Reference
10	Boston Celtics	1957–1966	9 (1957, 1959–1966)	
5	Golden State Warriors	2015–2019	3 (2015, 2017, 2018)	
4	Los Angeles Lakers	1982–1985	2 (1982, 1985)	
4	Boston Celtics	1984–1987	2 (1984, 1986)	
4	Miami Heat	2011–2014	2 (2012, 2013)	
4	Cleveland Cavaliers	2015–2018	1 (2016)	
3	New York Knicks	1951–1953	—	
3	Minneapolis Lakers	1952–1954	3 (1952–1954)	
3	Los Angeles Lakers	1968–1970	—	
3	Los Angeles Lakers	1987–1989	2 (1987, 1988)	
3	Detroit Pistons	1988–1990	2 (1989, 1990)	
3	Chicago Bulls	1991–1993	3 (1991–1993)	
3	Chicago Bulls	1996–1998	3 (1996–1998)	
3	Los Angeles Lakers	2000–2002	3 (2000–2002)	
3	Los Angeles Lakers	2008–2010	2 (2009, 2010)	
2	Philadelphia Warriors	1947–1948	1 (1947)	
2	Minneapolis Lakers	1949–1950	2 (1949, 1950)	
2	Syracuse Nationals	1954–1955	1 (1955)	
2	Fort Wayne Pistons	1955–1956	—	
2	St. Louis Hawks	1957–1958	1 (1958)	
2	St. Louis Hawks	1960–1961	—	
2	Los Angeles Lakers	1962–1963	—	
2	Los Angeles Lakers	1965–1966	—	
2	Boston Celtics	1968–1969	2 (1968, 1969)	
2	Los Angeles Lakers	1972–1973	1 (1972)	
2	New York Knicks	1972–1973	1 (1973)	
2	Washington Bullets	1978–1979	1 (1978)	
2	Seattle SuperSonics	1978–1979	1 (1979)	
2	Philadelphia 76ers	1982–1983	1 (1983)	
2	Houston Rockets	1994–1995	2 (1994, 1995)	
2	Utah Jazz	1997–1998	—	
2	New Jersey Nets	2002–2003	—	
2	Detroit Pistons	2004–2005	1 (2004)	
2	San Antonio Spurs	2013–2014	1 (2014)	

=== NBA championships win streaks ===
Championship streaks up to and including the 2025 NBA playoffs

Streak	Team	NBA championships win streak	Reference
8	Boston Celtics	1959–1966	
3	Minneapolis Lakers	1952–1954	
3	Chicago Bulls	1991–1993	
3	Chicago Bulls	1996–1998	
3	Los Angeles Lakers	2000–2002	
2	Minneapolis Lakers	1949–1950	
2	Boston Celtics	1968–1969	
2	Los Angeles Lakers	1987–1988	
2	Detroit Pistons	1989–1990	
2	Houston Rockets	1994–1995	
2	Los Angeles Lakers	2009–2010	
2	Miami Heat	2012–2013	
2	Golden State Warriors	2017–2018	

== See also ==
- List of NBA franchise postseason droughts
- List of NFL franchise post-season streaks
- List of MLB franchise postseason streaks
- List of NHL franchise post-season appearance streaks
