= 1979 NBA Finals =

1979 basketball championship series

Team	Coach	Wins
Seattle SuperSonics	Lenny Wilkens	4
Washington Bullets	Dick Motta	1
- Dates: May 20–June 1
- MVP: Dennis Johnson (Seattle SuperSonics)
- Hall of Famers: SuperSonics: Dennis Johnson (2010); Jack Sikma (2019); Bullets: Bob Dandridge (2021); Elvin Hayes (1990); Wes Unseld (1988); Coaches: Lenny Wilkens (1998); Officials: Hugh Evans (2022); Darell Garretson (2016)
- Eastern finals: Bullets defeated Spurs, 4–3
- Western finals: SuperSonics defeated Suns, 4–3

The 1979 NBA World Championship Series was the championship series played at the conclusion of the National Basketball Association (NBA)'s 1978–79 season. The Western Conference champion Seattle SuperSonics played the Eastern Conference champion Washington Bullets, with the Bullets holding home-court advantage, due to a better regular season record. The SuperSonics defeated the Bullets in five quick games for their first championship in franchise history. The series was a rematch of the previous year’s NBA Finals, which the Bullets won in seven games.

Dennis Johnson of the SuperSonics was named as the NBA Finals MVP, while Gus Williams of the SuperSonics was the top scorer, averaging 28.6 points per game.

This was Seattle's second men's professional sports championship, following the Seattle Metropolitans' victory in the 1917 Stanley Cup Final. The city's next title wouldn't be until 2014 when the Seattle Seahawks won Super Bowl XLVIII.

This was the franchise's only championship until the 2025 NBA Finals, when they were the Oklahoma City Thunder. It is also, to date, the last time the Bullets/Wizards have appeared in the Finals.

Both the 1978 and 1979 NBA Finals were informally dubbed the "George Washington series", because both teams were playing in places named after the first President of the United States (the SuperSonics represented Seattle, Washington while the Bullets represented Washington, D.C., albeit playing in nearby Landover, Maryland).

== Background ==
This was a rematch of the 1978 NBA Finals, which the Bullets won 4–3. Seattle lost Marvin Webster to the New York Knicks but acquired Lonnie Shelton in exchange. Other than that, both teams' rosters stayed virtually intact. Unlike the previous year, both teams finished 1–2 in the NBA, with the Bullets topping the league at 54 wins; the Sonics with 52 wins. In the playoffs, Seattle defeated the Los Angeles Lakers 4–1 and the Phoenix Suns 4–3, while Washington had a much tougher road, eliminating the Atlanta Hawks in an unexpectedly tough seven-game series and coming back from a 3–1 deficit to eliminate the San Antonio Spurs in seven. Both earned a first-round bye.

=== Television ===
The Finals were carried by CBS television (the network's NBA on CBS aired league games from 1973 to 1990), with Brent Musburger as the lead announcer. The 1979 Finals has been preserved in full, unlike the previous year's, in which Games 2, 3 and 4 are missing. (Except for 1978, all NBA Finals since 1975 have been completely preserved.)

=== Road to the Finals ===
Seattle SuperSonics (Western Conference champion)		Washington Bullets (Eastern Conference champion)
# / Western Conference; # / Team / W / L / PCT / GB; 1 / z-Seattle SuperSonics / 52 / 30 / .634 / –; 2 / y-Kansas City Kings / 48 / 34 / .585 / 4; 3 / x-Phoenix Suns / 50 / 32 / .610 / 2; 4 / x-Denver Nuggets / 47 / 35 / .573 / 5; 5 / x-Los Angeles Lakers / 47 / 35 / .573 / 5; 6 / x-Portland Trail Blazers / 45 / 37 / .549 / 7; 7 / San Diego Clippers / 43 / 39 / .524 / 9; 8 / Indiana Pacers / 38 / 44 / .463 / 14; 9 / Milwaukee Bucks / 38 / 44 / .463 / 14; 10 / Golden State Warriors / 38 / 44 / .463 / 14; 11 / Chicago Bulls / 31 / 51 / .378 / 21; 1st seed in the West, 2nd best league record	Regular season	# / Eastern Conference; # / Team / W / L / PCT / GB; 1 / z-Washington Bullets / 54 / 28 / .659 / –; 2 / y-San Antonio Spurs / 48 / 34 / .585 / 6; 3 / x-Philadelphia 76ers / 47 / 35 / .573 / 7; 4 / x-Houston Rockets / 47 / 35 / .573 / 7; 5 / x-Atlanta Hawks / 46 / 36 / .561 / 8; 6 / x-New Jersey Nets / 37 / 45 / .451 / 17; 7 / New York Knicks / 31 / 51 / .378 / 23; 8 / Cleveland Cavaliers / 30 / 52 / .366 / 24; 8 / Detroit Pistons / 30 / 52 / .366 / 24; 10 / Boston Celtics / 29 / 53 / .354 / 25; 11 / New Orleans Jazz / 26 / 56 / .317 / 28; 1st seed in the East, best league record
Earned first-round bye	First round	Earned first-round bye
Defeated the (5) Los Angeles Lakers, 4–1	Conference semifinals	Defeated the (5) Atlanta Hawks, 4–3
Defeated the (3) Phoenix Suns, 4–3	Conference finals	Defeated the (2) San Antonio Spurs, 4–3

=== Regular season series ===
The teams split the four-game series in the regular season:

October 25, 1978

Washington Bullets 92, Seattle SuperSonics 121

Kingdome, Seattle

January 23, 1979

Seattle SuperSonics 103, Washington Bullets 100

Capital Centre, Landover, Maryland

February 18, 1979

Washington Bullets 105, Seattle SuperSonics 94

Kingdome, Seattle

February 23, 1979

Seattle SuperSonics 110, Washington Bullets 132

Capital Centre, Landover, Maryland

== Series summary ==
Game	Date	Home team	Result	Road team
Game 1	May 20	Washington Bullets	99–97 (1–0)	Seattle SuperSonics
Game 2	May 24	Washington Bullets	82–92 (1–1)	Seattle SuperSonics
Game 3	May 27	Seattle SuperSonics	105–95 (2–1)	Washington Bullets
Game 4	May 29	Seattle SuperSonics	114–112 (3–1)	Washington Bullets
Game 5	June 1	Washington Bullets	93–97 (1–4)	Seattle SuperSonics

== Game summaries ==
=== Game 1 ===
May 20

Seattle SuperSonics 97, Washington Bullets 99
Scoring by quarter: 25–26, 25–33, 21–23, 26–17
Pts: Gus Williams 32; Rebs: John Johnson 11; Asts: Dennis Johnson 7	Pts: Larry Wright 26; Rebs: Wes Unseld 12; Asts: Tom Henderson 6
Washington leads the series, 1–0

Capital Centre, Landover, Maryland
Attendance: 19,035
Referees:
- No. 10 Darell Garreson,
- No. 4 Ed T. Rush
- No. 18 Ed Middleton

The Bullets controlled the game and led by 18 in the fourth, but Seattle mounted a furious comeback to tie it at 97. Larry Wright, who had 26 points off the bench, drove to the basket as time ran down and had his shot blocked by Dennis Johnson, but the referees called a foul on Johnson. Wright went to the line with one second left and hit two of three foul shots (NBA rules at the time awarded an extra free throw attempt when a team was in the penalty foul situation) to win the game.

=== Game 2 ===
May 24
9 p.m. EDT

Seattle SuperSonics 92, Washington Bullets 82
Scoring by quarter: 28–23, 21–29, 19–14, 24–16
Pts: Gus Williams 23; Rebs: Jack Sikma 13; Asts: Dennis Johnson, John Johnson 6 each	Pts: Bob Dandridge 21; Rebs: Elvin Hayes 14; Asts: Bob Dandridge 5
Series tied, 1–1

Capital Centre, Landover, Maryland
Attendance: 19,035
Referees:
- No. 9 John Vanak
- No. 14 Jack Madden
- No. 19 Jim Capers

Elvin Hayes had 11 points in the first quarter, but only nine the rest of the way as Seattle turned its defense up a notch, holding the Bullets to 30 points in the second half.

Outside of the two metropolitan areas of the competing teams, as well as Baltimore and Portland, the game was shown on tape delay beginning at 11:35 Eastern and Pacific/10:35 p.m. Central and Mountain. This was the first of six championship series games shown by CBS on tape delay over a three-season span. Four of the six games in the championship series two years later were shown on tape delay outside of the markets of the competing clubs.

=== Game 3 ===
May 27

Washington Bullets 95, Seattle SuperSonics 105
Scoring by quarter: 25–31, 19–24, 22–26, 29–24
Pts: Bob Dandridge 28; Rebs: Unseld, Hayes 14 each Asts: Bob Dandridge 5	Pts: Gus Williams 31; Rebs: Jack Sikma 17; Asts: Dennis Johnson 9
Seattle leads the series, 2–1

Kingdome, Seattle, Washington
Attendance: 35,928
Referees:
- No. 11 Jake O'Donnell
- No. 7 Joe Gushue
- No. 25 Hugh Evans

Seattle dominated this game, which wasn't as close as the final margin indicated. Gus Williams scored 31 points, Jack Sikma had 21 and 17 rebounds, and Dennis Johnson had a fine all-around game with 17 points, 9 rebounds, and two blocked shots.

=== Game 4 ===
May 29

Washington Bullets 112, Seattle SuperSonics 114 (OT)
Scoring by quarter: 16–24, 37–28, 28–32, 23–20, Overtime: 8–10
Pts: Hayes, Grevey, Charles Johnson 18 each Rebs: Wes Unseld 16; Asts: Tom Henderson 8	Pts: Gus Williams 36; Rebs: Jack Sikma 17; Asts: John Johnson 13
Seattle leads the series, 3–1

Seattle Center Coliseum, Seattle, Washington
Attendance: 14,098
Referees:
- No. 15 Bob Rakel
- No. 8 Lee Jones
- No. 10 Darell Garretson

The Sonics won a close one in OT 114–112, staving off a late Bullets comeback behind 36 points by Gus Williams and 32 by Dennis Johnson. Williams and Johnson dominated the Bullets' guards all series, as they were plagued by poor shooting. Johnson also had four blocks in the game, the last on Kevin Grevey with 4 seconds left to ensure the Seattle victory.

=== Game 5 ===
June 1

Seattle SuperSonics 97, Washington Bullets 93
Scoring by quarter: 19–30, 24–21, 23–18, 31–24
Pts: Gus Williams 23; Rebs: Jack Sikma 17; Asts: John Johnson 6	Pts: Elvin Hayes 29; Rebs: Elvin Hayes 14; Asts: Bob Dandridge 7
Seattle wins the series, 4–1

Capital Centre, Landover, Maryland
Attendance: 19,035
Referees:
- No. 11 Jake O'Donnell
- No. 7 Joe Gushue
- No. 22 Paul Mihalak

Back home, Elvin Hayes had a hot first half, scoring 20, but injuries to starting guards Tom Henderson, Kevin Grevey and prolonged poor shooting by their replacements took their toll. Hayes had only nine points in the second half as Seattle closed out the series.

== Player statistics ==
Legend
GP	Games played	GS	Games started	MPG	Minutes per game
FG%	Field-goal percentage	3P%	3-point field-goal percentage	FT%	Free-throw percentage
RPG	Rebounds per game	APG	Assists per game	SPG	Steals per game
BPG	Blocks per game	PPG	Points per game

Seattle SuperSonics

Seattle SuperSonics statistics
Player	GP	GS	MPG	FG%	3P%	FT%	RPG	APG	SPG	BPG	PPG

Washington Bullets

Washington Bullets statistics
Player	GP	GS	MPG	FG%	3P%	FT%	RPG	APG	SPG	BPG	PPG

== Team rosters ==
=== Seattle SuperSonics ===
1978–79 Seattle SuperSonics roster
Players

Pos.	No.	Player	Height	Weight	DOB	From
C	21	Dennis Awtrey	6 ft 10 in (2.08 m)	235 lb (107 kg)		Santa Clara
SG	32	Fred Brown	6 ft 3 in (1.91 m)	182 lb (83 kg)		Iowa
SG	10	Joe Hassett	6 ft 5 in (1.96 m)	180 lb (82 kg)		Providence
SG	24	Dennis Johnson	6 ft 4 in (1.93 m)	185 lb (84 kg)		Pepperdine
SF	27	John Johnson	6 ft 7 in (2.01 m)	200 lb (91 kg)		Iowa
C	23	Tom LaGarde	6 ft 10 in (2.08 m)	220 lb (100 kg)		North Carolina
SF	22	Jackie Robinson	6 ft 6 in (1.98 m)	200 lb (91 kg)		UNLV
PF	8	Lonnie Shelton	6 ft 8 in (2.03 m)	240 lb (109 kg)		Oregon State
C	43	Jack Sikma	6 ft 11 in (2.11 m)	230 lb (104 kg)		Illinois Wesleyan
PF	35	Paul Silas	6 ft 7 in (2.01 m)	220 lb (100 kg)		Creighton
SG	11	Dick Snyder	6 ft 5 in (1.96 m)	207 lb (94 kg)		Davidson
SF	42	Wally Walker	6 ft 7 in (2.01 m)	190 lb (86 kg)		Virginia
PG	1	Gus Williams	6 ft 2 in (1.88 m)	175 lb (79 kg)		USC

Coaches
Head coach
- (United States) Lenny Wilkens

Legend
- (DP) Unsigned draft pick
- (FA) Free agent
- (S) Suspended
- Injured

=== Washington Bullets ===
1978–79 Washington Bullets roster
Players

Pos.	No.	Player	Height	Weight	DOB	From
SF	42	Greg Ballard	6 ft 7 in (2.01 m)	215 lb (98 kg)		Oregon
SG	45	Phil Chenier	6 ft 3 in (1.91 m)	180 lb (82 kg)		California
C	40	Dave Corzine	6 ft 11 in (2.11 m)	250 lb (113 kg)		DePaul
SF	10	Bob Dandridge	6 ft 6 in (1.98 m)	195 lb (88 kg)		Norfolk State
SF	35	Kevin Grevey	6 ft 5 in (1.96 m)	210 lb (95 kg)		Kentucky
PG	14	Tom Henderson	6 ft 3 in (1.91 m)	190 lb (86 kg)		Hawaiʻi
PF	11	Elvin Hayes	6 ft 9 in (2.06 m)	235 lb (107 kg)		Houston
PF	25	Mitch Kupchak	6 ft 9 in (2.06 m)	230 lb (104 kg)		North Carolina
SG	15	Charles Johnson	6 ft 0 in (1.83 m)	170 lb (77 kg)		California
SG	22	Roger Phegley	6 ft 6 in (1.98 m)	205 lb (93 kg)		Bradley
C	41	Wes Unseld	6 ft 7 in (2.01 m)	245 lb (111 kg)		Louisville
PG	32	Larry Wright	6 ft 1 in (1.85 m)	160 lb (73 kg)		Grambling State

Coaches
Head coach
- Dick Motta

Legend
- (DP) Unsigned draft pick
- (FA) Free agent
- (S) Suspended
- Injured

== Aftermath ==
Until 2023, this was the most recent time that a Western Conference team not based in Texas or California won an NBA title, and the last of only two occasions alongside the 1976–77 Portland Trail Blazers when a team from the present-day Northwest Division won the league title. This is by 24 years the longest league championship drought for any division of the four major North American sports leagues. (Note: By comparison, the longest divisional title drought in the National Football League is nineteen seasons by the AFC South; every division has won at least one championship since 2015 in Major League Baseball; and in the National Hockey League the longest drought is seven seasons by the Pacific Division.) Between 1980 and 2022, the following Western teams have gone on to win an NBA title: the Los Angeles Lakers (eleven times), the San Antonio Spurs (five times), the Golden State Warriors (four times), the Houston Rockets (twice), and the Dallas Mavericks (once). The remaining twenty-one titles between 1980 and 2022 were won by Eastern Conference teams. (Note: Eight Eastern Conference teams from seven US states and Canada have won NBA Championships since 1980: Chicago Bulls (six times), Boston Celtics (four times), Detroit Pistons and Miami Heat (thrice each), and Philadelphia 76ers, Milwaukee Bucks, Cleveland Cavaliers and Toronto Raptors (once each).)

1979 represents the last year the Bullets/Wizards franchise won 50 games in a season, by far the longest drought in NBA history. It also remains their last NBA Finals, and last Conference Finals, appearance.

The city of Seattle did not win another championship in one of the four big North American sports until the Seattle Seahawks won Super Bowl XLVIII in 2014.

The SuperSonics did come close to another NBA championship before their move to Oklahoma City. They would return to the NBA Finals in 1996, but lost to the record-setting 72-win Chicago Bulls in six games, becoming the first victim of the Bulls’ second three-peat from 1996 to 1998. After their move to Oklahoma City, the Thunder made it back to the Finals in 2012 but lost to the Big Three-led Miami Heat in five games. They would eventually win the championship again in 2025 over the Indiana Pacers in seven games.

Even though the NBA considered both the SuperSonics and Thunder as one continuous franchise pending the expansion of a future Seattle team, the Thunder have never acknowledged the SuperSonics' 1979 championship as part of their history, as seen on their media guides and on the gold jersey tab which only denoted their 2025 championship. Additionally, as part of a relocation settlement between the Thunder and the city of Seattle, the SuperSonics' 1979 championship trophy and banner remain in Seattle's possession, and are currently stored in the Seattle Museum of History & Industry.

== See also ==
- 1979 NBA playoffs
