= List of Washington Wizards seasons =

This is a list of seasons completed by the Washington Wizards, a professional basketball team based in Washington, D.C. The Wizards are a member of the National Basketball Association (NBA), and currently play their home games at the Capital One Arena, in the Chinatown neighborhood of Washington, D.C.

== Table key ==
ASG MVP	All-Star Game Most Valuable Player
COY	Coach of the Year
DPOY	Defensive Player of the Year
Finish	Final position in league or division standings
GB	Games behind first-place team in division (Note: The formula is as follows: $\mathrm{Games}\ \mathrm{behind} = \frac{(\mathrm{Team A's}\ \mathrm{wins}-\mathrm{Team B's}\ \mathrm{wins}) + (\mathrm{Team B's}\ \mathrm{losses} - \mathrm{Team A's}\ \mathrm{losses})}{\mathrm{2}}$)
L	Number of regular season losses
EOY	Executive of the Year
FMVP	Finals Most Valuable Player
JWKC	J. Walter Kennedy Citizenship
MVP	Most Valuable Player
ROY	Rookie of the Year
SMOY	Sixth Man of the Year
MIP	Most Improved Player Award
W	Number of regular season wins

== Seasons ==
NBA champions	Conference champions	Division champions	Playoff berth

Season	Team	Conference	Finish	Division	Finish	Wins	Losses	Win%	GB	Playoffs	Awards	Head coach
Chicago Packers
1961–62	1961–62	—	—	Western	5th	18	62	.225	36		Walt Bellamy (ROY)	Jim Pollard
Chicago Zephyrs
1962–63	1962–63	—	—	Western	5th	25	55	.313	28		Terry Dischinger (ROY)	Jack McMahon; Bobby Leonard
Baltimore Bullets
1963–64	1963–64	—	—	Western	4th	31	49	.388	17			Bobby Leonard
1964–65	1964–65	—	—	Western	3rd	37	43	.463	12	Won Division semifinals (Hawks) 3–1; Lost Division finals (Lakers) 4–2		Buddy Jeannette
1965–66	1965–66	—	—	Western	2nd	38	42	.475	7	Lost Division semifinals (Hawks) 3–0		Paul Seymour
1966–67	1966–67	—	—	Eastern	5th	20	61	.247	48			Mike Farmer; Buddy Jeannette; Gene Shue
1967–68	1967–68	—	—	Eastern	6th	36	46	.439	26		Earl Monroe (ROY)	Gene Shue
1968–69	1968–69	—	—	Eastern	1st	57	25	.695	—	Lost Division semifinals (Knicks) 4–0	Wes Unseld (MVP, ROY); Gene Shue (COY)	Gene Shue
1969–70	1969–70	—	—	Eastern	3rd	50	32	.610	10	Lost Division semifinals (Knicks) 4–3		Gene Shue
1970–71	1970–71	Eastern	2nd	Central	1st	42	40	.512	—	Won conference semifinals (76ers) 4–3; Won conference finals (Knicks) 4–3; Lost NBA Finals (Bucks) 4–0		Gene Shue
1971–72	1971–72	Eastern	2nd	Central	1st	38	44	.463	—	Lost conference semifinals (Knicks) 4–2		Gene Shue
1972–73	1972–73	Eastern	2nd	Central	1st	52	30	.634	—	Lost conference semifinals (Knicks) 4–1		Gene Shue
Capital Bullets
1973–74	1973–74	Eastern	2nd	Central	1st	47	35	.573	—	Lost conference semifinals (Knicks) 4–3		K. C. Jones
Washington Bullets
1974–75	1974–75	Eastern	2nd	Central	1st	60	22	.732	—	Won conference semifinals (Braves) 4–3; Won conference finals (Celtics) 4–2; Lost NBA Finals (Warriors) 4–0	Wes Unseld (JWKC)	K. C. Jones
1975–76	1975–76	Eastern	3rd	Central	2nd	48	34	.585	1	Lost conference semifinals (Cavaliers) 4–3	Dave Bing (ASG MVP)	K. C. Jones
1976–77	1976–77	Eastern	3rd	Central	2nd	48	34	.585	1	Won First round (Cavaliers) 2–1; Lost conference semifinals (Rockets) 4–2	Dave Bing (JWKC)	Dick Motta
1977–78	1977–78	Eastern	3rd	Central	2nd	44	38	.537	8	Won First round (Hawks) 2–0; Won conference semifinals (Spurs) 4–2; Won conference finals (76ers) 4–2; Won NBA Finals (SuperSonics) 4–3	Wes Unseld (FMVP)	Dick Motta
1978–79	1978–79	Eastern	1st	Atlantic	1st	54	28	.659	—	Won conference semifinals (Hawks) 4–3; Won conference finals (Spurs) 4–3; Lost NBA Finals (SuperSonics) 4–1	Bob Ferry (EOY)	Dick Motta
1979–80	1979–80	Eastern	6th	Atlantic	3rd	39	43	.476	22	Lost First round (76ers) 2–0		Dick Motta
1980–81	1980–81	Eastern	7th	Atlantic	4th	39	43	.476	23			Gene Shue
1981–82	1981–82	Eastern	5th	Atlantic	4th	43	39	.524	20	Won First round (Nets) 2–0; Lost conference semifinals (Celtics) 4–1	Gene Shue (COY); Bob Ferry (EOY)	Gene Shue
1982–83	1982–83	Eastern	7th	Atlantic	5th	42	40	.512	23			Gene Shue
1983–84	1983–84	Eastern	8th	Atlantic	5th	35	47	.427	27	Lost First round (Celtics) 3–1		Gene Shue
1984–85	1984–85	Eastern	6th	Atlantic	4th	40	42	.488	23	Lost First round (76ers) 3–1		Gene Shue
1985–86	1985–86	Eastern	6th	Atlantic	4th	39	43	.476	28	Lost First round (76ers) 3–2		Gene Shue; Kevin Loughery
1986–87	1986–87	Eastern	6th	Atlantic	3rd	42	40	.512	17	Lost First round (Pistons) 3–0		Kevin Loughery
1987–88	1987–88	Eastern	7th	Atlantic	2nd	38	44	.463	19	Lost First round (Pistons) 3–2		Kevin Loughery; Wes Unseld
1988–89	1988–89	Eastern	9th	Atlantic	4th	40	42	.488	12			Wes Unseld
1989–90	1989–90	Eastern	10th	Atlantic	4th	31	51	.378	22			Wes Unseld
1990–91	1990–91	Eastern	10th	Atlantic	4th	30	52	.366	26			Wes Unseld
1991–92	1991–92	Eastern	13th	Atlantic	6th	25	57	.305	26		Pervis Ellison (MIP)	Wes Unseld
1992–93	1992–93	Eastern	14th	Atlantic	7th	22	60	.268	38			Wes Unseld
1993–94	1993–94	Eastern	12th	Atlantic	7th	24	58	.293	33		Don MacLean (MIP)	Wes Unseld
1994–95	1994–95	Eastern	14th	Atlantic	7th	21	61	.256	36			Jim Lynam
1995–96	1995–96	Eastern	10th	Atlantic	4th	39	43	.476	21		Gheorghe Mureșan (MIP)	Jim Lynam
1996–97	1996–97	Eastern	8th	Atlantic	4th	44	38	.537	17	Lost First round (Bulls) 3–0		Jim Lynam; Bob Staak; Bernie Bickerstaff
Washington Wizards
1997–98	1997–98	Eastern	9th	Atlantic	4th	42	40	.512	13			Bernie Bickerstaff
1998–99 (Note: Due to a lockout, the season did not start until February 5, 1999, and all 29 teams played a shortened 50 game regular season schedule.)	1998–99	Eastern	13th	Atlantic	6th	18	32	.360	15			Bernie Bickerstaff; Jim Brovelli
1999–2000	1999–00	Eastern	13th	Atlantic	7th	29	53	.354	23			Gar Heard; Darrell Walker
2000–01	2000–01	Eastern	14th	Atlantic	7th	19	63	.232	37			Leonard Hamilton
2001–02	2001–02	Eastern	10th	Atlantic	5th	37	45	.451	15			Doug Collins
2002–03	2002–03	Eastern	10th	Atlantic	6th	37	45	.451	12			Doug Collins
2003–04	2003–04	Eastern	13th	Atlantic	6th	25	57	.305	22			Eddie Jordan
2004–05	2004–05	Eastern	5th	Southeast	2nd	45	37	.549	14	Won First round (Bulls) 4–2; Lost conference semifinals (Heat) 4–0		Eddie Jordan
2005–06	2005–06	Eastern	5th	Southeast	2nd	42	40	.512	10	Lost First round (Cavaliers) 4–2		Eddie Jordan
2006–07	2006–07	Eastern	7th	Southeast	2nd	41	41	.500	3	Lost First round (Cavaliers) 4–0		Eddie Jordan
2007–08	2007–08	Eastern	5th	Southeast	2nd	43	39	.524	9	Lost First round (Cavaliers) 4–2		Eddie Jordan
2008–09	2008–09	Eastern	15th	Southeast	5th	19	63	.232	40			Eddie Jordan; Ed Tapscott
2009–10	2009–10	Eastern	14th	Southeast	5th	26	56	.317	33			Flip Saunders
2010–11	2010–11	Eastern	13th	Southeast	5th	23	59	.280	35			Flip Saunders
2011–12	2011–12	Eastern	14th	Southeast	4th	20	46	.303	26			Flip Saunders; Randy Wittman
2012–13	2012–13	Eastern	12th	Southeast	3rd	29	53	.354	37			Randy Wittman
2013–14	2013–14	Eastern	5th	Southeast	2nd	44	38	.537	10	Won First round (Bulls) 4–1; Lost conference semifinals (Pacers) 4–2		Randy Wittman
2014–15	2014–15	Eastern	5th	Southeast	2nd	46	36	.561	14	Won First round (Raptors) 4–0; Lost conference semifinals (Hawks) 4–2		Randy Wittman
2015–16	2015–16	Eastern	10th	Southeast	4th	41	41	.500	16			Randy Wittman
2016–17	2016–17	Eastern	4th	Southeast	1st	49	33	.598	—	Won First round (Hawks) 4–2; Lost conference semifinals (Celtics) 4–3		Scott Brooks
2017–18	2017–18	Eastern	8th	Southeast	2nd	43	39	.524	1	Lost First round (Raptors) 4–2		Scott Brooks
2018–19	2018–19	Eastern	11th	Southeast	4th	32	50	.390	10			Scott Brooks
2019–20	2019–20	Eastern	10th	Southeast	4th	25	47	.347	18.5			Scott Brooks
2020–21	2020–21	Eastern	8th	Southeast	3rd	34	38	.472	7	Lost First round (76ers) 4–1		Scott Brooks
2021–22	2021–22	Eastern	12th	Southeast	4th	35	47	.427	18			Wes Unseld Jr.
2022–23	2022–23	Eastern	12th	Southeast	3rd	35	47	.427	9			Wes Unseld Jr.
2023–24	2023–24	Eastern	14th	Southeast	5th	15	67	.183	32			Wes Unseld Jr. Brian Keefe
2024–25	2024–25	Eastern	15th	Southeast	5th	18	64	.220	23			Brian Keefe
2025–26	2025–26	Eastern	15th	Southeast	5th	17	65	.207	29			Brian Keefe

== All-time records ==
Note: Statistics are correct as of the conclusion of the 2025–26 NBA season.

Statistic	Wins	Losses	Win%
Chicago Packers / Zephyrs regular season record (1961–1963)	43	117	.269
Baltimore Bullets regular season record (1963–1973)	401	412	.493
Capital / Washington Bullets regular season record (1973–1997)	934	1,034	.475
Washington Wizards regular season record (1997–present)	972	1,498	.394
All-time regular season record	2,307	2,944	.439
Baltimore Bullets post-season record (1963–1973)	19	34	.358
Capital / Washington Bullets post-season record (1973–1997)	50	63	.442
Washington Wizards post-season record (1997–present)	30	41	.423
All-time post-season record	99	138	.418
All-time regular and post-season record	2,406	3,082	.438
