= List of Los Angeles Clippers seasons =

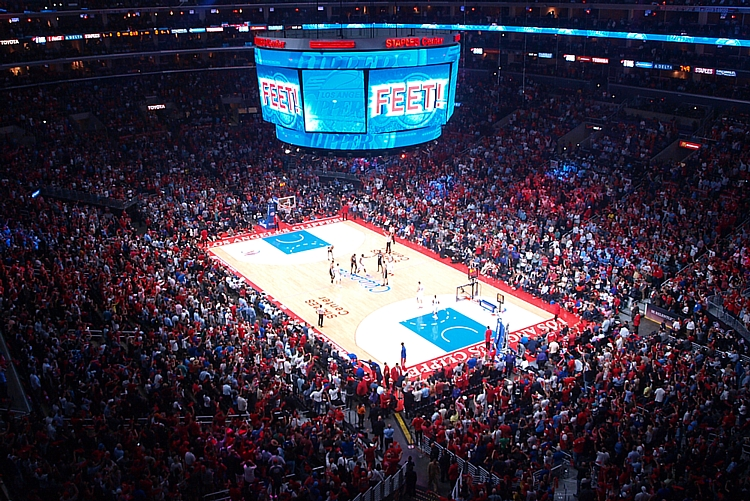
The Clippers hosting the San Antonio Spurs in Game 5 of the 2015 NBA playoffs first round series.

The Los Angeles Clippers are a professional basketball team based in the Greater Los Angeles area. They play in the National Basketball Association (NBA) and are a member of the NBA Western Conference's Pacific Division. The Clippers were founded in 1970 as the Buffalo Braves. They were one of three franchises that joined the NBA as an expansion team in the 1970–71 season. The Braves moved to San Diego, California after the 1977–78 season, and became known as the San Diego Clippers. For the 1984–85 NBA season, the Clippers moved north to Los Angeles and became known as the Los Angeles Clippers.

On October 14, 1970, the Braves beat the Cleveland Cavaliers 107–92 in their first game. In the 1972 NBA draft, the Braves selected Bob McAdoo, who later won such awards as Rookie of the Year and Most Valuable Player. During McAdoo's years (1972–76) with the franchise, the Braves reached the postseason three times and had a record of nine wins and 13 losses during that time.

Overall, the Clippers have qualified for the postseason 19 times; most recently in the 2024-25 season. They passed the first round of the playoffs seven times (1975–76, 2005–06, 2011–12, 2013–14, 2014–15, 2019–20 and 2020–21). The Clippers have never won league or Conference titles. Their 51-year drought between entering Western Conference finals (before doing so in 2020–21) is one of the longest in league history and the 30-year drought between winning a playoffs round (before doing so in 2005–06) is the longest in league history. They also have only 16 seasons with a winning percentage of .500 or better, and as a result, in their April 17, 2000 issue, the Sports Illustrated had three Clippers fans on the cover that stated "The worst franchise in sports history". A decade later, the additions of Blake Griffin and Chris Paul helped them win their first division title during the 2012–13 season, their 43rd year in the league, and they repeated the feat the following year. Paul and Griffin departed in 2017, and after a short transition period, the Clippers signed All-Stars Kawhi Leonard and Paul George in 2019.

== Table key ==
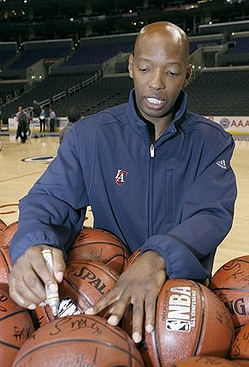
Sam Cassell was the co-captain of the Clippers during their 2005–06 postseason appearance.

Finish	Final position in league or division standings
GB	Games behind first-place team in division (Note: The formula is: $\mathrm{Games}\ \mathrm{behind} = \frac{(\mathrm{Team A's}\ \mathrm{wins}-\mathrm{Team B's}\ \mathrm{wins}) + (\mathrm{Team B's}\ \mathrm{losses} - \mathrm{Team A's}\ \mathrm{losses})}{\mathrm{2}}$)
ASG MVP	All-Star Game Most Valuable Player
EOY	Executive of the Year
MVP	Most Valuable Player
ROY	Rookie of the Year
MIP	Most Improved Player
W	Number of regular season wins
L	Number of regular season losses

== Seasons ==
Note: Statistics are correct as of the end of the 2025–26 season.

League champions	Conference champions	Division champions	Playoff berth	Play-in berth

Season	Team	League	Conference	Finish	Division	Finish	Wins	Losses	Win%	GB	Playoffs	Awards	Head coach
Buffalo Braves
1970–71	1970–71	NBA	Eastern	7th	Atlantic	4th	22	60	.268	30		—	Dolph Schayes
1971–72	1971–72	NBA	Eastern	8th	Atlantic	4th	22	60	.268	34		—	Dolph Schayes; Johnny McCarthy
1972–73	1972–73	NBA	Eastern	7th	Atlantic	3rd	21	61	.256	47		Bob McAdoo (ROY)	Jack Ramsay
1973–74	1973–74	NBA	Eastern	4th	Atlantic	3rd	42	40	.512	14	Lost conference semifinals (Celtics) 4–2	Ernie DiGregorio (ROY); Eddie Donovan (EOY)	Jack Ramsay
1974–75	1974–75	NBA	Eastern	3rd	Atlantic	2nd	49	33	.598	11	Lost conference semifinals (Bullets) 4–3	Bob McAdoo (MVP)	Jack Ramsay
1975–76	1975–76	NBA	Eastern	5th	Atlantic	2nd	46	36	.561	8	Won First round (76ers) 2–1; Lost conference semifinals (Celtics) 4–2	—	Jack Ramsay
1976–77	1976–77	NBA	Eastern	10th	Atlantic	4th	30	52	.366	20		Adrian Dantley (ROY)	Tates Locke; Bob MacKinnon; Joe Mullaney
1977–78	1977–78	NBA	Eastern	10th	Atlantic	4th	27	55	.329	28		Randy Smith (ASG MVP)	Cotton Fitzsimmons
San Diego Clippers
1978–79	1978–79 (Note: The team relocated to San Diego, California.)	NBA	Western	7th	Pacific	5th	43	39	.524	9		—	Gene Shue
1979–80	1979–80	NBA	Western	7th	Pacific	5th	35	47	.427	25		—	Gene Shue
1980–81	1980–81	NBA	Western	9th	Pacific	5th	36	46	.439	21		—	Paul Silas
1981–82	1981–82	NBA	Western	12th	Pacific	6th	17	65	.207	40		—	Paul Silas
1982–83	1982–83	NBA	Western	11th	Pacific	6th	25	57	.305	33		Terry Cummings (ROY)	Paul Silas
1983–84	1983–84	NBA	Western	11th	Pacific	6th	30	52	.366	24		—	Jim Lynam
Los Angeles Clippers
1984–85	1984–85 (Note: The team relocated to Los Angeles, California.)	NBA	Western	11th	Pacific	4th	31	51	.378	31		—	Jim Lynam; Don Chaney
1985–86	1985–86	NBA	Western	10th	Pacific	3rd	32	50	.390	30		—	Don Chaney
1986–87	1986–87	NBA	Western	12th	Pacific	6th	12	70	.146	53		—	Don Chaney
1987–88	1987–88	NBA	Western	12th	Pacific	6th	17	65	.207	45		—	Gene Shue
1988–89	1988–89	NBA	Western	11th	Pacific	7th	21	61	.256	36		—	Gene Shue; Don Casey
1989–90	1989–90	NBA	Western	11th	Pacific	6th	30	52	.366	33		—	Don Casey
1990–91	1990–91	NBA	Western	10th	Pacific	6th	31	51	.378	32		—	Mike Schuler
1991–92	1991–92	NBA	Western	7th	Pacific	5th	45	37	.549	12	Lost First round (Jazz) 3–2	—	Mike Schuler; Mack Calvin; Larry Brown
1992–93	1992–93	NBA	Western	7th	Pacific	4th	41	41	.500	21	Lost First round (Rockets) 3–2	—	Larry Brown
1993–94	1993–94	NBA	Western	11th	Pacific	7th	27	55	.329	36		—	Bob Weiss
1994–95	1994–95	NBA	Western	13th	Pacific	7th	17	65	.207	42		—	Bill Fitch
1995–96	1995–96	NBA	Western	11th	Pacific	7th	29	53	.354	35		—	Bill Fitch
1996–97	1996–97	NBA	Western	8th	Pacific	5th	36	46	.439	21	Lost First round (Jazz) 3–0	—	Bill Fitch
1997–98	1997–98	NBA	Western	13th	Pacific	7th	17	65	.207	44		—	Bill Fitch
1998–99 (Note: Due to a lockout, the season did not start until February 5, 1999, and all 29 teams played a shortened 50 game regular season schedule.)	1998–99	NBA	Western	13th	Pacific	7th	9	41	.180	26		—	Chris Ford
1999–00	1999–2000	NBA	Western	14th	Pacific	7th	15	67	.183	52		—	Chris Ford; Jim Todd
2000–01	2000–01	NBA	Western	12th	Pacific	6th	31	51	.378	25		—	Alvin Gentry
2001–02	2001–02	NBA	Western	9th	Pacific	5th	39	43	.476	22		—	Alvin Gentry
2002–03	2002–03	NBA	Western	13th	Pacific	7th	27	55	.329	32		—	Alvin Gentry; Dennis Johnson
2003–04	2003–04	NBA	Western	14th	Pacific	7th	28	54	.341	28		—	Mike Dunleavy
2004–05	2004–05	NBA	Western	10th	Pacific	3rd	37	45	.451	25		Bobby Simmons (MIP)	Mike Dunleavy
2005–06	2005–06	NBA	Western	6th	Pacific	2nd	47	35	.573	7	Won First round (Nuggets) 4–1; Lost conference semifinals (Suns) 4–3	Elgin Baylor (EOY); Elton Brand (SPOR)	Mike Dunleavy
2006–07	2006–07	NBA	Western	9th	Pacific	4th	40	42	.488	21		—	Mike Dunleavy
2007–08	2007–08	NBA	Western	12th	Pacific	5th	23	59	.280	34		—	Mike Dunleavy
2008–09	2008–09	NBA	Western	14th	Pacific	4th	19	63	.232	46		—	Mike Dunleavy
2009–10	2009–10	NBA	Western	12th	Pacific	3rd	29	53	.354	28		—	Mike Dunleavy; Kim Hughes
2010–11	2010–11	NBA	Western	13th	Pacific	4th	32	50	.390	25		Blake Griffin (ROY)	Vinny Del Negro
2011–12 (Note: Due to a lockout, the season did not start until December 25, 2011 and all 30 teams played a shortened 66 game regular season schedule.)	2011–12	NBA	Western	5th	Pacific	2nd	40	26	.606	1	Won First round (Grizzlies) 4–3; Lost conference semifinals (Spurs) 4–0	—	Vinny Del Negro
2012–13	2012–13	NBA	Western	4th	Pacific	1st	56	26	.683	–	Lost First round (Grizzlies) 4–2	Chris Paul (ASG MVP)	Vinny Del Negro
2013–14	2013–14	NBA	Western	3rd	Pacific	1st	57	25	.695	–	Won First round (Warriors) 4–3; Lost conference semifinals (Thunder) 4–2	Jamal Crawford (SIX)	Doc Rivers
2014–15	2014–15	NBA	Western	3rd	Pacific	2nd	56	26	.683	11	Won First round (Spurs) 4–3; Lost conference semifinals (Rockets) 4–3	—	Doc Rivers
2015–16	2015–16	NBA	Western	4th	Pacific	2nd	53	29	.646	20	Lost First round (Trail Blazers) 4–2	Jamal Crawford (SIX)	Doc Rivers
2016–17	2016–17	NBA	Western	4th	Pacific	2nd	51	31	.622	16	Lost First round (Jazz) 4–3	—	Doc Rivers
2017–18	2017–18	NBA	Western	10th	Pacific	2nd	42	40	.512	16		Lou Williams (SIX)	Doc Rivers
2018–19	2018-19	NBA	Western	8th	Pacific	2nd	48	34	.585	9	Lost First round (Warriors) 4–2	Lou Williams (SIX)	Doc Rivers
2019–20	2019–20	NBA	Western	2nd	Pacific	2nd	49	23	.681	3.5	Won First round (Mavericks) 4–2; Lost conference semifinals (Nuggets) 4–3	Montrezl Harrell (SIX); Lawrence Frank (EOY); Kawhi Leonard (ASG MVP)	Doc Rivers
2020–21	2020–21	NBA	Western	4th	Pacific	2nd	47	25	.653	4	Won First round (Mavericks) 4–3; Won conference semifinals (Jazz) 4–2; Lost conference finals (Suns) 4–2	—	Tyronn Lue
2021–22	2021–22	NBA	Western	9th (Note: Fell to the 9th seed after losing to the New Orleans Pelicans in the NBA play-in tournament.)	Pacific	3rd	42	40	.512	22		—	Tyronn Lue
2022–23	2022–23	NBA	Western	5th	Pacific	3rd	44	38	.537	4	Lost First round (Suns) 4–1	—	Tyronn Lue
2023–24	2023–24	NBA	Western	4th	Pacific	1st	51	31	.622	–	Lost First round (Mavericks) 4–2	—	Tyronn Lue
2024–25	2024–25	NBA	Western	5th	Pacific	2nd	50	32	.610	–	Lost First round (Nuggets) 4–3	—	Tyronn Lue
2025–26	2025–26	NBA	Western	10th (Note: Fell to the 10th seed after losing to the Golden State Warriors in the NBA play-in tournament.)	Pacific	3rd	42	40	.512	11		—	Tyronn Lue

=== All-time records ===
Note: Statistics are correct as of the end of the 2025–26 season.

Statistic	Wins	Losses	W–L%
Buffalo Braves regular season record (1970–1978)	259	397	.395
San Diego Clippers regular season record (1978–1984)	186	306	.378
Los Angeles Clippers regular season record (1984–present)	1,490	1,886	.441
All-time regular season record	1,935	2,589	.428
Buffalo Braves postseason record (1970–1978)	9	13	.409
San Diego Clippers postseason record (1978–1984)	0	0	—
Los Angeles Clippers postseason record (1984–present)	60	78	.435
All-time postseason record	69	91	.431
All-time regular and postseason record	2,004	2,680	.428
