= List of Utah Jazz seasons =

Utah Jazz joined the National Basketball Association (NBA) as New Orleans Jazz, an expansion team that played in the 1974–75 season. The Jazz relocated from New Orleans to Salt Lake City, Utah, for the 1979–80 season.

== Seasons ==
NBA champions	Conference champions	Division champions	Playoff berth

Season	League	Conference	Finish	Division	Finish	Wins	Losses	Win%	GB	Playoffs	Awards	Head coach
New Orleans Jazz
1974–75	NBA	Eastern	9th	Central	5th	23	59	.280	37			Scotty Robertson; Elgin Baylor; Butch van Breda Kolff
1975–76	NBA	Eastern	8th	Central	4th	38	44	.463	11			Butch van Breda Kolff
1976–77	NBA	Eastern	8th	Central	5th	35	47	.427	14			Butch van Breda Kolff; Elgin Baylor
1977–78	NBA	Eastern	7th	Central	5th	39	43	.476	13			Elgin Baylor
1978–79	NBA	Eastern	11th	Central	6th	26	56	.317	22			Elgin Baylor
Utah Jazz
1979–80	NBA	Western	10th	Midwest	5th	24	58	.293	25			Tom Nissalke
1980–81	NBA	Western	11th	Midwest	5th	28	54	.341	24		Darrell Griffith (ROY)	Tom Nissalke
1981–82	NBA	Western	11th	Midwest	6th	25	57	.305	23			Tom Nissalke; Frank Layden
1982–83	NBA	Western	9th	Midwest	5th	30	52	.366	23			Frank Layden
1983–84	NBA	Western	2nd	Midwest	1st	45	37	.549	—	Won First round (Nuggets) 3–2; Lost conference semifinals (Suns) 4–2	Frank Layden (COY, EOY, JWKC); Adrian Dantley (CPOY)	Frank Layden
1984–85	NBA	Western	6th	Midwest	4th	41	41	.500	11	Won First round (Rockets) 3–2; Lost conference semifinals (Nuggets) 4–1	Mark Eaton (DPOY)	Frank Layden
1985–86	NBA	Western	5th	Midwest	4th	42	40	.512	9	Lost First round (Mavericks) 3–1		Frank Layden
1986–87	NBA	Western	4th	Midwest	2nd	44	38	.537	11	Lost First round (Warriors) 3–2		Frank Layden
1987–88	NBA	Western	5th	Midwest	3rd	47	35	.573	7	Won First round (Trail Blazers) 3–1; Lost conference semifinals (Lakers) 4–3		Frank Layden
1988–89	NBA	Western	2nd	Midwest	1st	51	31	.622	—	Lost First round (Warriors) 3–0	Mark Eaton (DPOY); Karl Malone (ASG MVP); Thurl Bailey (JWKC)	Frank Layden; Jerry Sloan
1989–90	NBA	Western	4th	Midwest	2nd	55	27	.671	1	Lost First round (Suns) 3–2		Jerry Sloan
1990–91	NBA	Western	5th	Midwest	2nd	54	28	.659	1	Won First round (Suns) 3–1; Lost conference semifinals (Trail Blazers) 4–1		Jerry Sloan
1991–92	NBA	Western	2nd	Midwest	1st	55	27	.671	—	Won First round (Clippers) 3–2; Won conference semifinals (SuperSonics) 4–1; Lost conference finals (Trail Blazers) 4–2		Jerry Sloan
1992–93	NBA	Western	6th	Midwest	3rd	47	35	.573	8	Lost First round (SuperSonics) 3–2	Karl Malone (ASG MVP); John Stockton (ASG MVP)	Jerry Sloan
1993–94	NBA	Western	5th	Midwest	3rd	53	29	.646	5	Won First round (Spurs) 3–1; Won conference semifinals (Nuggets) 4–3; Lost conference finals (Rockets) 4–1		Jerry Sloan
1994–95	NBA	Western	3rd	Midwest	2nd	60	22	.732	2	Lost First round (Rockets) 3–2		Jerry Sloan
1995–96	NBA	Western	3rd	Midwest	2nd	55	27	.671	4	Won First round (Trail Blazers) 3–2; Won conference semifinals (Spurs) 4–2; Lost conference finals (SuperSonics) 4–3		Jerry Sloan
1996–97	NBA	Western	1st	Midwest	1st	64	18	.780	—	Won First round (Clippers) 3–0; Won conference semifinals (Lakers) 4–1; Won conference finals (Rockets) 4–2; Lost NBA Finals (Bulls) 4–2	Karl Malone (MVP)	Jerry Sloan
1997–98	NBA	Western	1st	Midwest	1st	62	20	.756	—	Won First round (Rockets) 3–2; Won conference semifinals (Spurs) 4–1; Won conference finals (Lakers) 4–0; Lost NBA Finals (Bulls) 4–2		Jerry Sloan
1998–99	NBA	Western	3rd	Midwest	2nd	37	13	.740	—	Won First round (Kings) 3–2; Lost conference semifinals (Trail Blazers) 4–2	Karl Malone (MVP)	Jerry Sloan
1999–00	NBA	Western	2nd	Midwest	1st	55	27	.671	—	Won First round (SuperSonics) 3–2; Lost conference semifinals (Trail Blazers) 4–1		Jerry Sloan
2000–01	NBA	Western	4th	Midwest	2nd	53	29	.646	5	Lost First round (Mavericks) 3–2		Jerry Sloan
2001–02	NBA	Western	8th	Midwest	4th	44	38	.537	14	Lost First round (Kings) 3–1		Jerry Sloan
2002–03	NBA	Western	7th	Midwest	4th	47	35	.573	13	Lost First round (Kings) 4–1		Jerry Sloan
2003–04	NBA	Western	9th	Midwest	7th	42	40	.512	16			Jerry Sloan
2004–05	NBA	Western	14th	Northwest	5th	26	56	.317	26			Jerry Sloan
2005–06	NBA	Western	9th	Northwest	2nd	41	41	.500	3			Jerry Sloan
2006–07	NBA	Western	4th	Northwest	1st	51	31	.622	—	Won First round (Rockets) 4–3; Won conference semifinals (Warriors) 4–1; Lost conference finals (Spurs) 4–1		Jerry Sloan
2007–08	NBA	Western	4th	Northwest	1st	54	28	.659	—	Won First round (Rockets) 4–2; Lost conference semifinals (Lakers) 4–2		Jerry Sloan
2008–09	NBA	Western	8th	Northwest	3rd	48	34	.585	6	Lost First round (Lakers) 4–1		Jerry Sloan
2009–10	NBA	Western	5th	Northwest	2nd	53	29	.646	—	Won First round (Nuggets) 4–2; Lost conference semifinals (Lakers) 4–0		Jerry Sloan
2010–11	NBA	Western	11th	Northwest	4th	39	43	.476	16			Jerry Sloan; Tyrone Corbin
2011–12	NBA	Western	8th	Northwest	3rd	36	30	.545	11	Lost First round (Spurs) 4–0		Tyrone Corbin
2012–13	NBA	Western	9th	Northwest	3rd	43	39	.524	17			Tyrone Corbin
2013–14	NBA	Western	15th	Northwest	5th	25	57	.305	34			Tyrone Corbin
2014–15	NBA	Western	11th	Northwest	3rd	38	44	.463	13			Quin Snyder
2015–16	NBA	Western	9th	Northwest	3rd	40	42	.488	15			Quin Snyder
2016–17	NBA	Western	5th	Northwest	1st	51	31	.622	—	Won First round (Clippers) 4–3; Lost conference semifinals (Warriors) 4–0		Quin Snyder
2017–18	NBA	Western	5th	Northwest	3rd	48	34	.585	1	Won First round (Thunder) 4–2; Lost conference semifinals (Rockets) 4–1	Rudy Gobert (DPOY)	Quin Snyder
2018–19	NBA	Western	5th	Northwest	3rd	50	32	.610	4	Lost First round (Rockets) 4–1	Rudy Gobert (DPOY)	Quin Snyder
2019–20	NBA	Western	6th	Northwest	3rd	44	28	.611	1.5	Lost First round (Nuggets) 4–3		Quin Snyder
2020–21	NBA	Western	1st	Northwest	1st	52	20	.722	—	Won First round (Grizzlies) 4–1; Lost conference semifinals (Clippers) 4–2	Rudy Gobert (DPOY); Jordan Clarkson (SIX)	Quin Snyder
2021–22	NBA	Western	5th	Northwest	1st	49	33	.598	—	Lost First round (Mavericks) 4–2		Quin Snyder
2022–23	NBA	Western	12th	Northwest	4th	37	45	.451	16		Lauri Markkanen (MIP)	Will Hardy
2023–24	NBA	Western	12th	Northwest	4th	31	51	.378	26			Will Hardy
2024–25	NBA	Western	15th	Northwest	5th	17	65	.207	51			Will Hardy
2025–26	NBA	Western	15th	Northwest	5th	22	60	.268	42			Will Hardy
All-time regular and playoff totals						2,351	2,137	.524	1974–present			
Regular season totals						2,216	1,980	.528	1974–present			
Playoff totals						135	157	.462	Playoff Series Record: 25–31			
