= List of Phoenix Suns seasons =

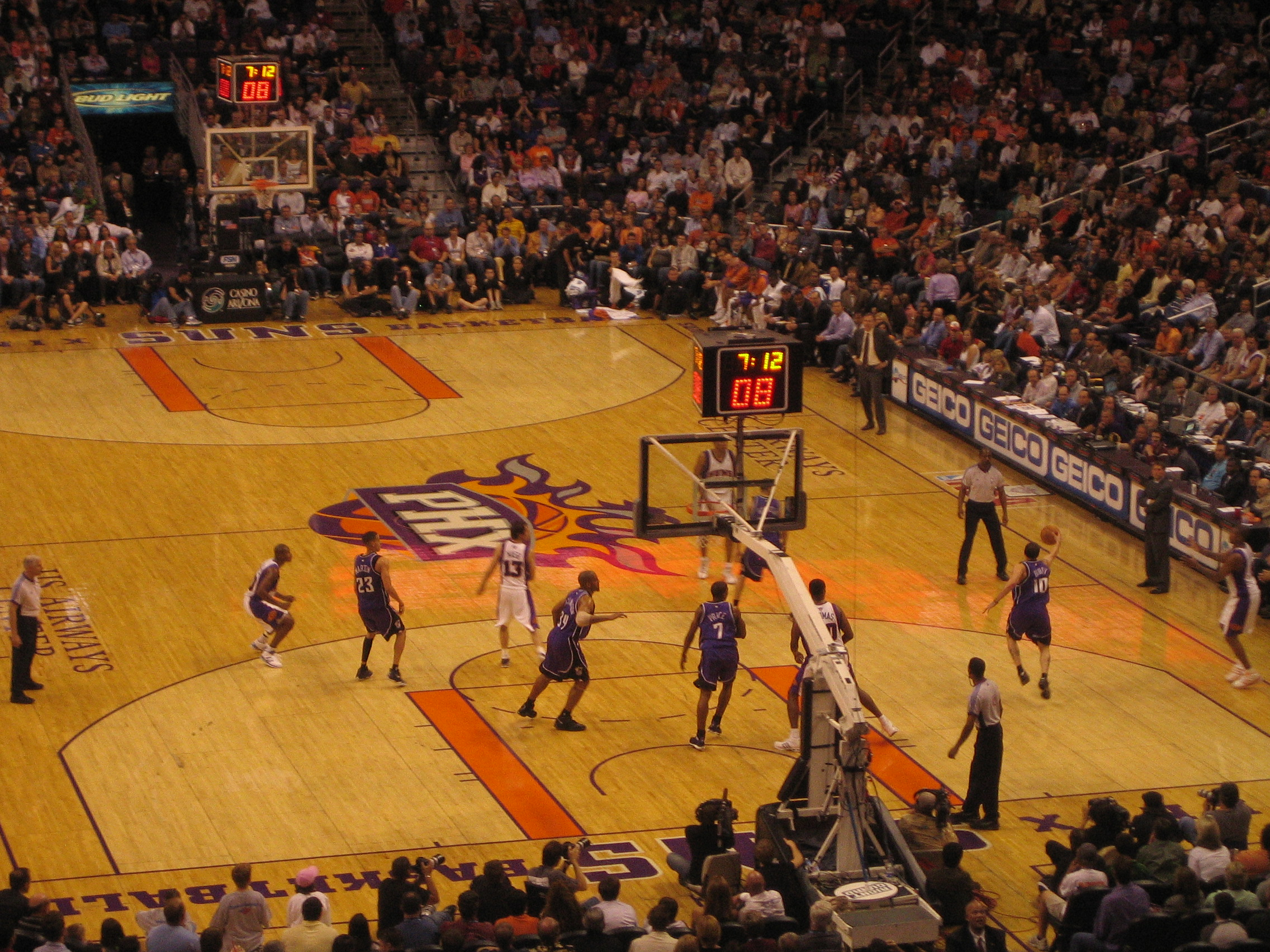
A home game against the Sacramento Kings in the 2006–07 NBA season

The Phoenix Suns are a professional basketball team based in Phoenix, Arizona, United States. They are members of the Pacific Division of the Western Conference in the National Basketball Association (NBA). The Suns began playing in the NBA as an expansion team in the 1968–69 NBA season. In their inaugural season, the Suns posted a win–loss record of 16–66. They participated in the playoffs only once in their first seven seasons.

In the 1975–76 season, a rookie Alvan Adams helped the team reach its first NBA Finals, which they lost to the Boston Celtics 4–2. Charles Barkley and Steve Nash won the Most Valuable Player (MVP) award while playing for the Suns. Barkley led the Suns to the 1993 NBA Finals, where they lost to the Chicago Bulls. After signing with the Suns in 2004, Nash led the team to three straight division titles, but after reaching the conference finals in 2009–10 the Suns subsequently experienced their worst period of on-court failure, missing the playoffs for ten consecutive seasons until the 2020–21 season (the franchise's previous record playoff drought was five seasons, which happened after the team made the postseason in only their second year of existence during the 1969–70 campaign).

Despite their failures in the 2010s, the Suns franchise has the NBA's eighth-best all-time winning percentage, having won nearly 54% of their contests as of the conclusion of the 2022–23 NBA season. In their first forty-three seasons, the Suns made the playoffs 29 times, posted nineteen seasons with fifty or more wins, appeared nine times in the Western Conference finals, and advanced to the NBA Finals three times in 1976, 1993, and 2021. As a result, based on their all-time winning percentage, the Suns are the 2nd-most successful franchise to never win an NBA championship, behind only the Utah Jazz.

== Table key ==
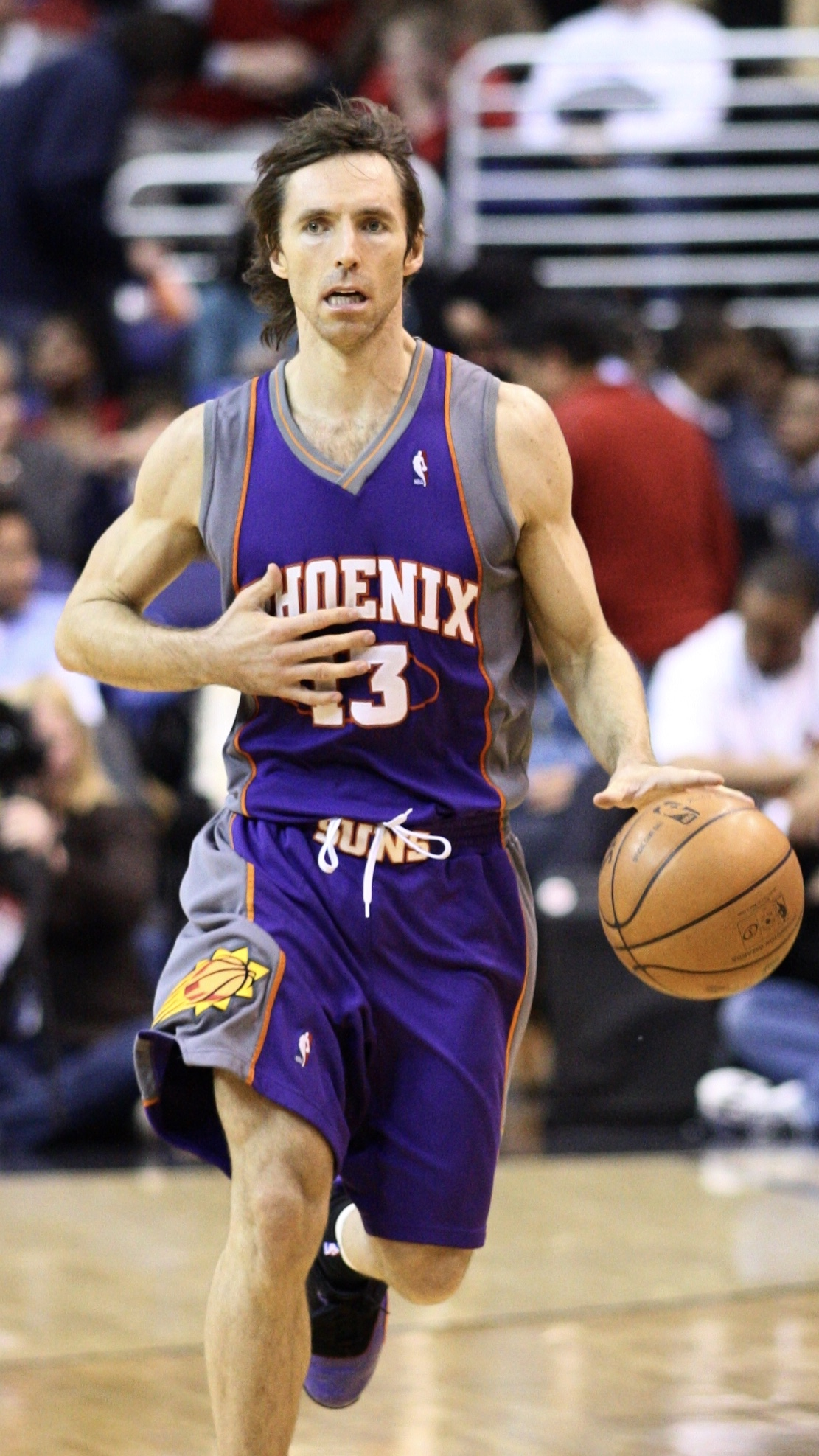
Steve Nash won two MVP awards as a member of the Suns.

ASG MVP	All-Star Game Most Valuable Player
COY	Coach of the Year
Finish	Final position in league or division standings
GB	Games behind first-place team in division^{[a]}
Losses	Number of regular season losses
EOY	Executive of the Year
JWKC	J. Walter Kennedy Citizenship
MVP	Most Valuable Player
ROY	Rookie of the Year
SIX	Sixth Man of the Year
SPOR	Sportmanship Award
Wins	Number of regular season wins
Win%	Winning percentage

== Seasons ==
Note: Statistics are correct as of the end of the 2025–26 season.

NBA champions	Conference champions	Division champions	Playoff berth	Play-in berth

Season	League	Conference	Finish	Division	Finish	Wins	Losses	Win%	GB	Playoffs	Awards	Head coach
1968–69	NBA	—	—	Western	7th	16	66	.195	39			Johnny Kerr
1969–70	NBA	—	—	Western	4th	39	43	.476	9	Lost Division semifinals (Lakers) 4–3		Johnny Kerr; Jerry Colangelo
1970–71	NBA	Western	5th	Midwest	3rd	48	34	.585	18			Cotton Fitzsimmons
1971–72	NBA	Western	5th	Midwest	3rd	49	33	.598	14			Cotton Fitzsimmons
1972–73	NBA	Western	6th	Pacific	3rd	38	44	.463	22			Butch van Breda Kolff; Jerry Colangelo
1973–74	NBA	Western	8th	Pacific	4th	30	52	.366	17			John MacLeod
1974–75	NBA	Western	8th	Pacific	4th	32	50	.390	16			John MacLeod
1975–76	NBA	Western	3rd	Pacific	3rd	42	40	.512	17	Won conference semifinals (SuperSonics) 4–2; Won conference finals (Warriors) 4–3; Lost NBA Finals (Celtics) 4–2	Alvan Adams (ROY); Jerry Colangelo (EOY)	John MacLeod
1976–77	NBA	Western	10th	Pacific	5th	34	48	.415	19			John MacLeod
1977–78	NBA	Western	3rd	Pacific	2nd	49	33	.598	9	Lost First round (Bucks) 2–0	Walter Davis (ROY)	John MacLeod
1978–79	NBA	Western	3rd	Pacific	2nd	50	32	.610	2	Won First round (Trail Blazers) 2–1; Won conference semifinals (Kings) 4–1; Lost conference finals (SuperSonics) 4–3		John MacLeod
1979–80	NBA	Western	4th	Pacific	3rd	55	27	.671	5	Won First round (Kings) 2–1; Lost conference semifinals (Lakers) 4–1		John MacLeod
1980–81	NBA	Western	1st	Pacific	1st	57	25	.695	—	Lost conference semifinals (Kings) 4–3	Jerry Colangelo (EOY)	John MacLeod
1981–82	NBA	Western	5th	Pacific	3rd	46	36	.561	11	Won First round (Nuggets) 2–1; Lost conference semifinals (Lakers) 4–0		John MacLeod
1982–83	NBA	Western	3rd	Pacific	2nd	53	29	.646	5	Lost First round (Nuggets) 2–1		John MacLeod
1983–84	NBA	Western	6th	Pacific	4th	41	41	.500	13	Won First round (Trail Blazers) 3–2; Won conference semifinals (Jazz) 4–2; Lost conference finals (Lakers) 4–2		John MacLeod
1984–85	NBA	Western	8th	Pacific	3rd	36	46	.439	26	Lost First round (Lakers) 3–0		John MacLeod
1985–86	NBA	Western	9th	Pacific	3rd	32	50	.390	30			John MacLeod
1986–87	NBA	Western	9th	Pacific	5th	36	46	.439	29			John MacLeod; Dick Van Arsdale
1987–88	NBA	Western	9th	Pacific	4th	28	54	.341	34			John Wetzel
1988–89	NBA	Western	3rd	Pacific	2nd	55	27	.671	2	Won First round (Nuggets) 3–0; Won conference semifinals (Warriors) 4–1; Lost conference finals (Lakers) 4–0	Eddie Johnson (SIX); Kevin Johnson (MIP); Cotton Fitzsimmons (COY); Jerry Colangelo (EOY)	Cotton Fitzsimmons
1989–90	NBA	Western	5th	Pacific	3rd	54	28	.659	9	Won First round (Jazz) 3–2; Won conference semifinals (Lakers) 4–1; Lost conference finals (Trail Blazers) 4–2		Cotton Fitzsimmons
1990–91	NBA	Western	4th	Pacific	3rd	55	27	.671	8	Lost First round (Jazz) 3–1	Kevin Johnson (JWKC)	Cotton Fitzsimmons
1991–92	NBA	Western	4th	Pacific	3rd	53	29	.646	4	Won First round (Spurs) 3–0; Lost conference semifinals (Trail Blazers) 4–1		Cotton Fitzsimmons
1992–93	NBA	Western	1st	Pacific	1st	62	20	.756	—	Won First round (Lakers) 3–2; Won conference semifinals (Spurs) 4–2; Won conference finals (SuperSonics) 4–3; Lost NBA Finals (Bulls) 4–2	Charles Barkley (MVP); Jerry Colangelo (EOY)	Paul Westphal
1993–94	NBA	Western	3rd	Pacific	2nd	56	26	.683	7	Won First round (Warriors) 3–0; Lost conference semifinals (Rockets) 4–3		Paul Westphal
1994–95	NBA	Western	2nd	Pacific	1st	59	23	.720	—	Won First round (Trail Blazers) 3–0; Lost conference semifinals (Rockets) 4–3		Paul Westphal
1995–96	NBA	Western	7th	Pacific	4th	41	41	.500	23	Lost First round (Spurs) 3–1		Paul Westphal; Cotton Fitzsimmons
1996–97	NBA	Western	7th	Pacific	4th	40	42	.488	17	Lost First round (SuperSonics) 3–2		Cotton Fitzsimmons; Danny Ainge
1997–98	NBA	Western	4th	Pacific	3rd	56	26	.683	5	Lost First round (Spurs) 3–1	Danny Manning (SIX)	Danny Ainge
1998–99^{[b]}	NBA	Western	7th	Pacific	3rd	27	23	.540	8	Lost First round (Trail Blazers) 3–0		Danny Ainge
1999–00	NBA	Western	5th	Pacific	3rd	53	29	.646	14	Won First round (Spurs) 3–1; Lost conference semifinals (Lakers) 4–1	Rodney Rogers (SIX)	Danny Ainge; Scott Skiles
2000–01	NBA	Western	6th	Pacific	3rd	51	31	.623	5	Lost First round (Kings) 3–1		Scott Skiles
2001–02	NBA	Western	10th	Pacific	6th	36	46	.439	25			Scott Skiles; Frank Johnson
2002–03	NBA	Western	8th	Pacific	4th	44	38	.537	15	Lost First round (Spurs) 4–2	Amar'e Stoudemire (ROY)	Frank Johnson
2003–04	NBA	Western	13th	Pacific	6th	29	53	.354	27			Frank Johnson; Mike D'Antoni
2004–05	NBA	Western	1st	Pacific	1st	62	20	.756	—	Won First round (Grizzlies) 4–0; Won conference semifinals (Mavericks) 4–2; Lost conference finals (Spurs) 4–1	Steve Nash (MVP); Mike D'Antoni (COY); Bryan Colangelo (EOY)	Mike D'Antoni
2005–06	NBA	Western	2nd	Pacific	1st	54	28	.659	—	Won First round (Lakers) 4–3; Won conference semifinals (Clippers) 4–3; Lost conference finals (Mavericks) 4–2	Steve Nash (MVP); Boris Diaw (MIP)	Mike D'Antoni
2006–07	NBA	Western	2nd	Pacific	1st	61	21	.744	—	Won First round (Lakers) 4–1; Lost conference semifinals (Spurs) 4–2	Leandro Barbosa (SIX); Steve Nash (JWKC)	Mike D'Antoni
2007–08	NBA	Western	6th	Pacific	2nd	55	27	.671	2	Lost First round (Spurs) 4–1	Grant Hill (SPOR)	Mike D'Antoni
2008–09	NBA	Western	9th	Pacific	2nd	46	36	.561	19		Shaquille O'Neal^{[d]} (ASG MVP)	Terry Porter; Alvin Gentry
2009–10	NBA	Western	3rd	Pacific	2nd	54	28	.659	3	Won First round (Trail Blazers) 4–2; Won conference semifinals (Spurs) 4–0; Lost conference finals (Lakers) 4–2	Grant Hill (SPOR)	Alvin Gentry
2010–11	NBA	Western	10th	Pacific	2nd	40	42	.488	17			Alvin Gentry
2011–12^{[c]}	NBA	Western	10th	Pacific	3rd	33	33	.500	17			Alvin Gentry
2012–13	NBA	Western	15th	Pacific	5th	25	57	.305	32			Alvin Gentry; Lindsey Hunter
2013–14	NBA	Western	9th	Pacific	3rd	48	34	.585	9		Goran Dragić (MIP)	Jeff Hornacek
2014–15	NBA	Western	10th	Pacific	3rd	39	43	.476	28			Jeff Hornacek
2015–16	NBA	Western	14th	Pacific	4th	23	59	.280	50			Jeff Hornacek; Earl Watson
2016–17	NBA	Western	15th	Pacific	5th	24	58	.293	43			Earl Watson
2017–18	NBA	Western	15th	Pacific	5th	21	61	.256	37			Earl Watson; Jay Triano
2018–19	NBA	Western	15th	Pacific	5th	19	63	.232	38			Igor Kokoškov
2019–20	NBA	Western	10th	Pacific	3rd	34	39	.466	19			Monty Williams
2020–21	NBA	Western	2nd	Pacific	1st	51	21	.708	—	Won First round (Lakers) 4–2; Won conference semifinals (Nuggets) 4–0; Won conference finals (Clippers) 4–2; Lost NBA Finals (Bucks) 4–2	James Jones (EOY)	Monty Williams
2021–22	NBA	Western	1st	Pacific	1st	64	18	.780	—	Won First round (Pelicans) 4–2; Lost conference semifinals (Mavericks) 4–3	Monty Williams (COY)	Monty Williams
2022–23	NBA	Western	4th	Pacific	2nd	45	37	.549	3	Won First round (Clippers) 4–1; Lost conference semifinals (Nuggets) 4–2		Monty Williams
2023–24	NBA	Western	6th	Pacific	2nd	49	33	.598	2	Lost First round (Timberwolves) 4–0		Frank Vogel
2024–25	NBA	Western	11th	Pacific	5th	36	46	.439	14			Mike Budenholzer
2025–26	NBA	Western	8th^{[e]}	Pacific	2nd	45	37	.549	8	Lost First round (Thunder) 4–0		Jordan Ott

=== All-time records ===
Statistic	Wins	Losses	Win%
Regular season record (1968–present)	2,510	2,179	.535
Postseason record (1968–present)	160	168	.488
All-time regular and post-season record (1968–present)	2,670	2,347	.532

== Notes ==
- ^{a} This is determined by adding the absolute difference in wins between the leading team and the team of interest to the absolute difference in losses between the two teams, and dividing by two.
- ^{b} Because of a lockout, the season did not start until February 5, 1999, and all 29 teams played a shortened 50-game regular season schedule.
- ^{c} Because of a lockout, the season did not start until December 25, 2011, and all 30 teams played a shortened 66-game regular season schedule.
- ^{d} Shaquille O'Neal shared the All-Star Game Most Valuable Player award with Kobe Bryant of the Los Angeles Lakers.
- ^{e} Fell to 8th after losing to the Portland Trail Blazers in the NBA play-in tournament.
