= List of Cleveland Cavaliers seasons =

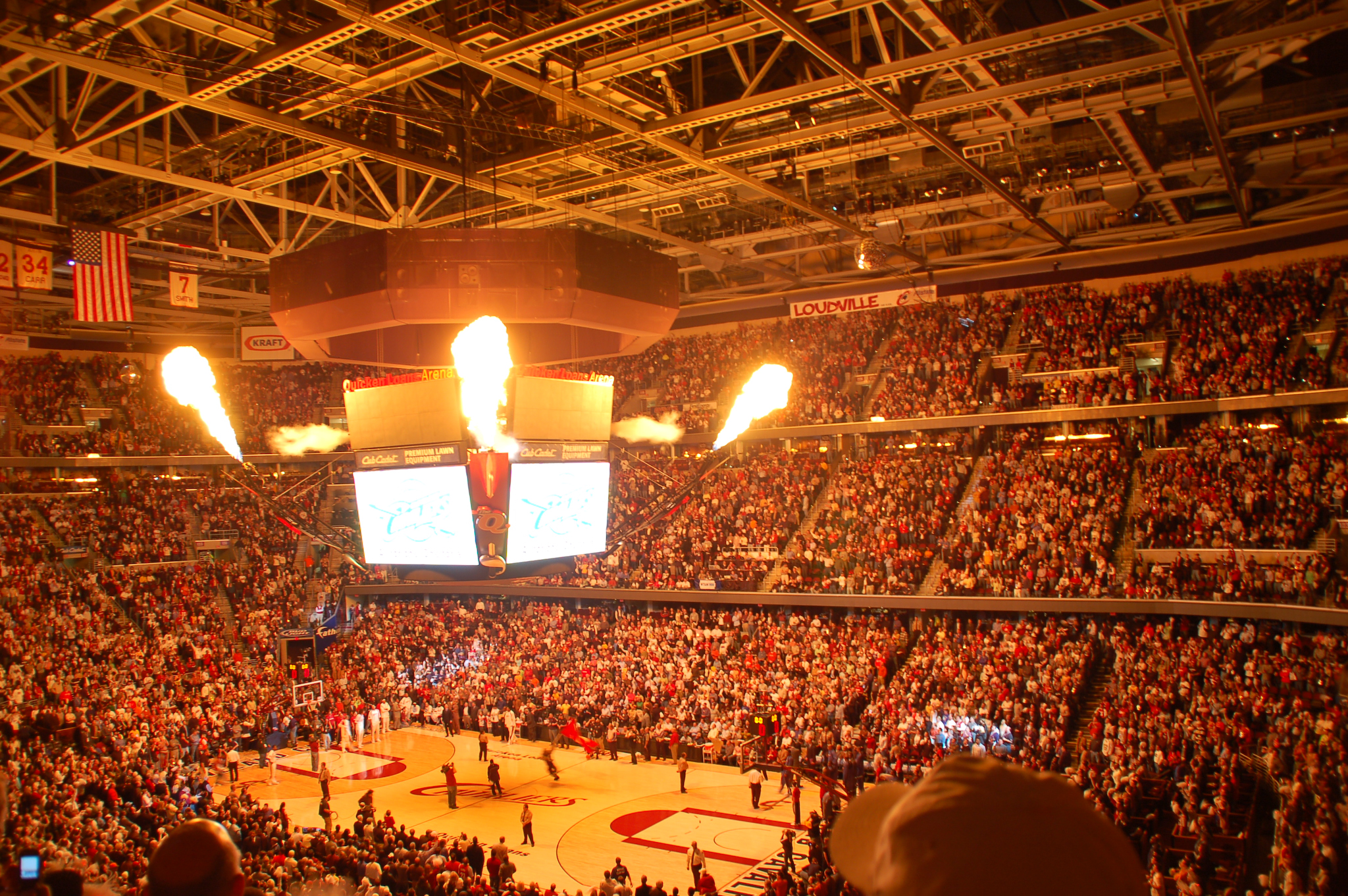
Rocket Arena, home of the Cleveland Cavaliers since 1994.

The Cleveland Cavaliers (also known simply as the Cavs) are an American professional basketball team based in Cleveland, Ohio. They began playing in the National Basketball Association (NBA) in 1970. This list summarizes the team's season-by-season records, including post-season, and includes select season-end awards won by the team's players and/or coaches. The Cavaliers were founded in 1970 as an expansion franchise and since their first season, they have always played in the Central Division and the Eastern Conference.

On October 14, 1970, the Cavs lost to the Buffalo Braves 92–107 in their first game. They have been awarded the first overall draft pick six times, choosing Austin Carr (1971), Brad Daugherty (1986), LeBron James (2003), Kyrie Irving (2011), Anthony Bennett (2013) and Andrew Wiggins (2014). In his last season with the Cavs, Austin Carr won the J. Walter Kennedy Citizenship Award, the first of four Cavaliers to win the award (Eric Snow, Luol Deng and LeBron James won the award in 2005, 2014 and 2017, respectively). As a Cavalier, LeBron won Rookie of the Year as well as two MVP awards and two All Star Game MVP awards. He also led the Cavaliers to five NBA Finals, including the last 4 straight, and won the 2016 title as Finals MVP. Cleveland's next first overall pick after James, Kyrie Irving, won Rookie of the Year in 2012 and NBA All-Star Game MVP in 2014.

In their 56 seasons, the Cavs have achieved a winning record 28 times. Highlights include 26 playoff appearances, which includes winning the Central Division championship eight times (1975–76, 2008–09, 2009–10, 2014–15, 2015–16, 2016–17, 2017–18, and 2024–25) winning the Eastern Conference championship five times (2006–07, 2014–15, 2015–16, 2016–17, and 2017–18), and winning the NBA championship in 2016. In five straight playoff appearances with LeBron James in his first tenure with Cleveland, the Cavs won more playoff games than they lost each season, something they only ever managed, barely, once before, in the 1991–92 season. Overall, their record is 2148–2369 (.476) as of the 2025–26 season. They are 144–129 (.527) in the playoffs.

== Key ==
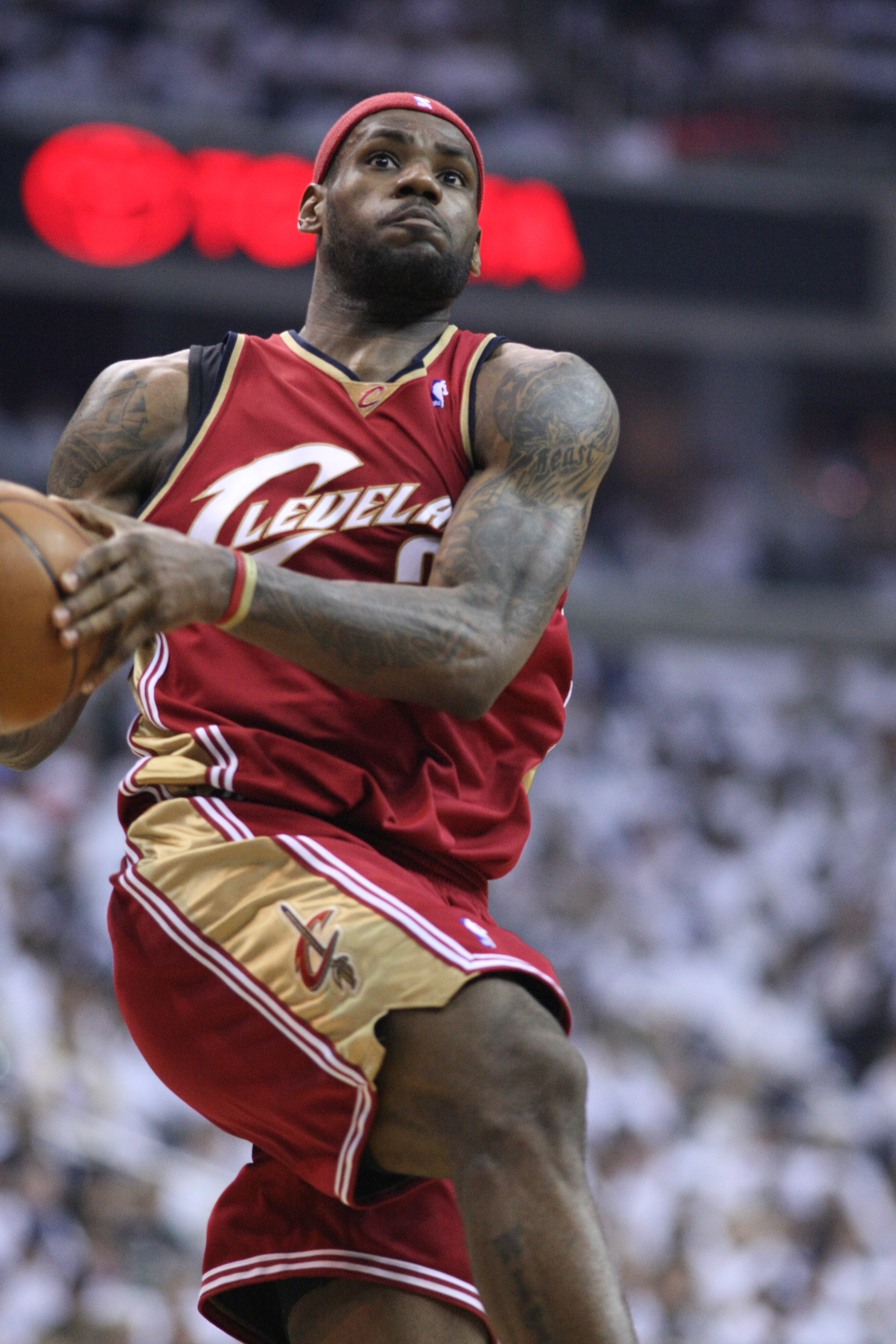
LeBron James - who in his 11 seasons with the Cavaliers (in two separate stints) was the 2004 Rookie of the Year, 2008 Scoring Champion, two-time NBA MVP, three-time All-Star Game MVP, 2016 NBA Champion, and 2016 Finals MVP.

Finish	Final position in league or division standings
ECSF	Eastern Conference Semifinals
ECF	Eastern Conference Finals
ASG MVP	All-Star Game Most Valuable Player
COY	Coach of the Year
EOY	Executive of the Year
MVP	Most Valuable Player
FMVP	NBA Finals Most Valuable Player Award
ROY	Rookie of the Year
DPOY	Defensive Player of the Year
SPOR	Sportsmanship Award
JWKC	J. Walter Kennedy Citizenship Award
	NBA Champions
	Conference Champions
	Division Champions
	Playoff berth
	Play-in berth

== Seasons ==
Note: Statistics are correct as of the 2025–26 season.

Season	Team	League	Conference	Finish	Division	Finish	Wins	Losses	Win%	GB	Playoffs	Awards	Head coach	Ref.
1970–71	1970–71	NBA	Eastern	8th	Central	4th	15	67	.183	27	—	—	Bill Fitch	
1971–72	1971–72	NBA	Eastern	7th	Central	4th	23	59	.280	15	—	—	Bill Fitch	
1972–73	1972–73	NBA	Eastern	6th	Central	4th	32	50	.390	20	—	—	Bill Fitch	
1973–74	1973–74	NBA	Eastern	7th	Central	4th	29	53	.354	18	—	—	Bill Fitch	
1974–75	1974–75	NBA	Eastern	6th	Central	3rd	40	42	.488	20	—	—	Bill Fitch	
1975–76	1975–76	NBA	Eastern	2nd	Central	1st	49	33	.598	—	Won ECSF (Bullets) 4–3; Lost ECF (Celtics) 4–2	Bill Fitch (COY)	Bill Fitch	
1976–77	1976–77	NBA	Eastern	6th	Central	4th	43	39	.524	6	Lost First round (Bullets) 2–1	—	Bill Fitch	
1977–78	1977–78	NBA	Eastern	4th	Central	3rd	43	39	.524	9	Lost First round (Knicks) 2–0	—	Bill Fitch	
1978–79	1978–79	NBA	Eastern	8th	Central	5th (Note: The Cavaliers and Pistons ended the 1978–79 season with identical 30–52 records.)	30	52	.366	18	—	—	Bill Fitch	
1979–80	1979–80	NBA	Eastern	8th	Central	5th (Note: The Cavaliers and Pacers ended the 1979–80 season with identical 37–45 records.)	37	45	.451	13	—	Austin Carr (JWKC)	Stan Albeck	
1980–81	1980–81	NBA	Eastern	9th	Central	5th	28	54	.341	32	—	—	Bill Musselman (25–46); Don Delaney (3–8)	
1981–82	1981–82	NBA	Eastern	11th	Central	6th	15	67	.183	40	—	—	Don Delaney (4–11); Bob Kloppenburg (0–3); Chuck Daly (9–32); Bill Musselman (2–21)	
1982–83	1982–83	NBA	Eastern	10th	Central	5th	23	59	.280	28	—	—	Tom Nissalke	
1983–84	1983–84	NBA	Eastern	9th	Central	4th	28	54	.341	22	—	—	Tom Nissalke	
1984–85	1984–85	NBA	Eastern	8th	Central	4th	36	46	.439	23	Lost First round (Celtics) 3–1	—	George Karl	
1985–86	1985–86	NBA	Eastern	9th	Central	5th	29	53	.354	28	—	—	George Karl (25–42); Gene Littles (4–11)	
1986–87	1986–87	NBA	Eastern	9th	Central	6th	31	51	.380	26	—	—	Lenny Wilkens	
1987–88	1987–88	NBA	Eastern	6th	Central	5th (Note: The Cavaliers and Bucks ended the 1987–88 season with identical 42–40 records.)	42	40	.512	12	Lost First round (Bulls) 3–2	—	Lenny Wilkens	
1988–89	1988–89	NBA	Eastern	3rd	Central	2nd	57	25	.695	6	Lost First round (Bulls) 3–2	—	Lenny Wilkens	
1989–90	1989–90	NBA	Eastern	7th	Central	4th (Note: The Cavaliers and Pacers ended the 1989–90 season with identical 42–40 records.)	42	40	.512	17	Lost First round (76ers) 3–2	—	Lenny Wilkens	
1990–91	1990–91	NBA	Eastern	9th	Central	6th	33	49	.402	28	—	—	Lenny Wilkens	
1991–92	1991–92	NBA	Eastern	3rd	Central	2nd	57	25	.695	10	Won First round (Nets) 3–1; Won ECSF (Celtics) 4–3; Lost ECF (Bulls) 4–2	Wayne Embry (EOY)	Lenny Wilkens	
1992–93	1992–93	NBA	Eastern	3rd	Central	2nd	54	28	.658	3	Won First round (Nets) 3–2; Lost ECSF (Bulls) 4–0	—	Lenny Wilkens	
1993–94	1993–94	NBA	Eastern	6th	Central	4th (Note: The Cavaliers and Pacers ended the 1993–94 season with identical 47–35 records.)	47	35	.573	10	Lost First round (Bulls) 3–0	—	Mike Fratello	
1994–95	1994–95	NBA	Eastern	6th	Central	4th	43	39	.524	9	Lost First round (Knicks) 3–1	—	Mike Fratello	
1995–96	1995–96	NBA	Eastern	4th	Central	3rd	47	35	.573	25	Lost First round (Knicks) 3–0	—	Mike Fratello	
1996–97	1996–97	NBA	Eastern	9th	Central	5th	42	40	.512	27	—	Terrell Brandon (SPOR)	Mike Fratello	
1997–98	1997–98	NBA	Eastern	6th	Central	5th	47	35	.573	15	Lost First round (Pacers) 3–1	Wayne Embry (EOY)	Mike Fratello	
1998–99 (Note: Due to a lockout, the 1998–99 season was shortened to 50 games, with teams beginning play on February 5, 1999.)	1998–99	NBA	Eastern	11th	Central	7th	22	28	.440	11	—	—	Mike Fratello	
1999–2000	1999–2000	NBA	Eastern	11th	Central	6th	32	50	.390	24	—	—	Randy Wittman	
2000–01	2000–01	NBA	Eastern	11th	Central	6th	30	52	.366	22	—	—	Randy Wittman	
2001–02	2001–02	NBA	Eastern	14th	Central	7th	29	53	.354	21	—	—	John Lucas II	
2002–03	2002–03	NBA	Eastern	15th	Central	8th	17	65	.207	33	—	—	John Lucas II (8–34); Keith Smart (9–31)	
2003–04	2003–04	NBA	Eastern	9th	Central	5th	35	47	.427	26	—	LeBron James (ROY)	Paul Silas	
2004–05	2004–05	NBA	Eastern	9th	Central	4th	42	40	.512	12	—	Eric Snow (JWKC)	Paul Silas (34–30); Brendan Malone (8–10)	
2005–06	2005–06	NBA	Eastern	4th	Central	2nd	50	32	.610	14	Won First round (Wizards) 4–2; Lost ECSF (Pistons) 4–3	LeBron James (ASG MVP)	Mike Brown	
2006–07	2006–07	NBA	Eastern	2nd	Central	2nd	50	32	.610	3	Won First round (Wizards) 4–0; Won ECSF (Nets) 4–2; Won ECF (Pistons) 4–2; Lost NBA Finals (Spurs) 4–0	—	Mike Brown	
2007–08	2007–08	NBA	Eastern	4th	Central	2nd	45	37	.549	14	Won First round (Wizards) 4–2; Lost ECSF (Celtics) 4–3	LeBron James (ASG MVP)	Mike Brown	
2008–09	2008–09	NBA	Eastern	1st	Central	1st	66	16	.805	—	Won First round (Pistons) 4–0; Won ECSF (Hawks) 4–0; Lost ECF (Magic) 4–2	LeBron James (MVP); Mike Brown (COY)	Mike Brown	
2009–10	2009–10	NBA	Eastern	1st	Central	1st	61	21	.744	—	Won First round (Bulls) 4–1; Lost ECSF (Celtics) 4–2	LeBron James (MVP)	Mike Brown	
2010–11	2010–11	NBA	Eastern	15th	Central	5th	19	63	.232	43	—	—	Byron Scott	
2011–12 (Note: Due to a lockout, the 2011–12 season was shortened to 66 games, with teams beginning play on December 25, 2011.)	2011–12	NBA	Eastern	13th	Central	5th	21	45	.318	29	—	Kyrie Irving (ROY)	Byron Scott	
2012–13	2012–13	NBA	Eastern	13th	Central	5th	24	58	.293	25.5	—	—	Byron Scott	
2013–14	2013–14	NBA	Eastern	10th	Central	3rd	33	49	.402	23	—	Kyrie Irving (ASG MVP); Luol Deng (JWKC)	Mike Brown	
2014–15	2014–15	NBA	Eastern	2nd	Central	1st	53	29	.646	—	Won First round (Celtics) 4–0; Won ECSF (Bulls) 4–2; Won ECF (Hawks) 4–0; Lost NBA Finals (Warriors) 4–2	—	David Blatt	
2015–16	2015–16	NBA	Eastern	1st	Central	1st	57	25	.695	—	Won First round (Pistons) 4–0; Won ECSF (Hawks) 4–0; Won ECF (Raptors) 4–2; Won NBA Finals (Warriors) 4–3	LeBron James (FMVP)	David Blatt (30–11); Tyronn Lue (27–14)	
2016–17	2016–17	NBA	Eastern	2nd	Central	1st	51	31	.622	—	Won First round (Pacers) 4–0; Won ECSF (Raptors) 4–0; Won ECF (Celtics) 4–1; Lost NBA Finals (Warriors) 4–1	LeBron James (JWKC)	Tyronn Lue	
2017–18	2017–18	NBA	Eastern	4th	Central	1st	50	32	.610	—	Won First round (Pacers) 4–3; Won ECSF (Raptors) 4–0; Won ECF (Celtics) 4–3; Lost NBA Finals (Warriors) 4–0	LeBron James (ASG MVP)	Tyronn Lue	
2018–19	2018–19	NBA	Eastern	14th	Central	5th	19	63	.232	41	—	—	Tyronn Lue (0–6); Larry Drew (19–57)	
2019–20 (Note: The 2019–20 season was suspended on March 11, 2020 due to the COVID-19 pandemic, and restarted on July 30, 2020, but the Cavaliers were not invited back to play due to playoff ineligibility, thus ending their season after 65 games.)	2019–20	NBA	Eastern	15th	Central	5th	19	46	.292	33	—	—	John Beilein (14–40); J. B. Bickerstaff (5–6)	
2020–21 (Note: The 2020–21 season was shortened to 72 games due to the COVID-19 pandemic, with teams beginning play on December 22, 2020.)	2020–21	NBA	Eastern	13th	Central	4th	22	50	.306	27	—	—	J. B. Bickerstaff	
2021–22	2021–22	NBA	Eastern	9th (Note: Ended the regular season as the eighth seed. Fell to the ninth seed after losing to the Brooklyn Nets and the Atlanta Hawks in the NBA play-in tournament.)	Central	3rd	44	38	.537	9	—	—	J. B. Bickerstaff	
2022–23	2022–23	NBA	Eastern	4th	Central	2nd	51	31	.622	7	Lost First round (Knicks) 4–1	—	J. B. Bickerstaff	
2023–24	2023–24	NBA	Eastern	4th	Central	2nd	48	34	.585	16	Won First round (Magic) 4–3; Lost ECSF (Celtics) 4–1	—	J. B. Bickerstaff	
2024–25	2024–25	NBA	Eastern	1st	Central	1st	64	18	.780	—	Won First round (Heat) 4–0; Lost ECSF (Pacers) 4–1	Evan Mobley (DPOY); Kenny Atkinson (COY)	Kenny Atkinson	
2025–26	2025–26	NBA	Eastern	4th	Central	2nd	52	30	.634	8	Won First round (Raptors) 4–3; Won ECSF (Pistons) 4–3; Lost ECF (Knicks) 4–0		Kenny Atkinson	

=== All-time records ===
Statistic	Wins	Losses	Win%
Regular season	2,148	2,369	.476
Postseason	144	129	.527
Total	2,292	2,498	.478
