= List of Milwaukee Bucks seasons =

This is a list of seasons completed by the Milwaukee Bucks of the National Basketball Association (NBA). The Bucks joined the NBA as an expansion team in the 1968 season. Milwaukee's 1971 NBA title in their 3rd year of existence marks the Bucks as the fastest team ever to go from being an entirely new franchise to being an NBA champion. With their 2021 title, the Bucks are now the only NBA franchise to win championships while having been in both the Western (1971) and Eastern (2021) conferences.

== Seasons ==
NBA champions	Conference champions	Division champions	Playoff berth

Season	League	Conference	Finish	Division	Finish	Wins	Losses	Win%	GB	Playoffs	Awards	Head coach
1968–69	NBA	—	—	Eastern	7th	27	55	.329	30			Larry Costello
1969–70	NBA	—	—	Eastern	2nd	56	26	.683	4	Won Division semifinals (76ers) 4–1; Lost Division finals (Knicks) 4–1	Lew Alcindor (ROY)	Larry Costello
1970–71	NBA	Western	1st	Midwest	1st	66	16	.805	—	Won conference semifinals (Warriors) 4–1; Won conference finals (Lakers) 4–1; Won NBA Finals (Bullets) 4–0	Lew Alcindor (MVP, FMVP)	Larry Costello
1971–72	NBA	Western	2nd	Midwest	1st	63	19	.768	—	Won conference semifinals (Warriors) 4–1; Lost conference finals (Lakers) 4–2	Kareem Abdul-Jabbar (MVP)	Larry Costello
1972–73	NBA	Western	1st	Midwest	1st	60	22	.732	—	Lost conference semifinals (Warriors) 4–2		Larry Costello
1973–74	NBA	Western	1st	Midwest	1st	59	23	.720	—	Won conference semifinals (Lakers) 4–1; Won conference finals (Bulls) 4–0; Lost NBA Finals (Celtics) 4–3	Kareem Abdul-Jabbar (MVP)	Larry Costello
1974–75	NBA	Western	7th	Midwest	4th	38	44	.463	9			Larry Costello
1975–76	NBA	Western	4th	Midwest	1st	38	44	.463	—	Lost First round (Pistons) 2–1		Larry Costello
1976–77	NBA	Western	11th	Midwest	6th	30	52	.366	20			Larry Costello; Don Nelson
1977–78	NBA	Western	6th	Midwest	2nd	44	38	.537	4	Won First round (Suns) 2–0; Lost conference semifinals (Nuggets) 4–3		Don Nelson
1978–79	NBA	Western	9th	Midwest	4th	38	44	.463	10			Don Nelson
1979–80	NBA	Western	2nd	Midwest	1st	49	33	.598	—	Lost conference semifinals (SuperSonics) 4–3		Don Nelson
1980–81	NBA	Eastern	2nd	Central	1st	60	22	.732	—	Lost conference semifinals (76ers) 4–3		Don Nelson
1981–82	NBA	Eastern	2nd	Central	1st	55	27	.671	—	Lost conference semifinals (76ers) 4–2		Don Nelson
1982–83	NBA	Eastern	2nd	Central	1st	51	31	.622	—	Won conference semifinals (Celtics) 4–0; Lost conference finals (76ers) 4–1	Sidney Moncrief (DPOY); Don Nelson (COY)	Don Nelson
1983–84	NBA	Eastern	2nd	Central	1st	50	32	.610	—	Won First round (Hawks) 3–2; Won conference semifinals (Nets) 4–2; Lost conference finals (Celtics) 4–1	Sidney Moncrief (DPOY)	Don Nelson
1984–85	NBA	Eastern	2nd	Central	1st	59	23	.720	—	Won First round (Bulls) 3–1; Lost conference semifinals (76ers) 4–0	Don Nelson (COY)	Don Nelson
1985–86	NBA	Eastern	2nd	Central	1st	57	25	.695	—	Won First round (Nets) 3–0; Won conference semifinals (76ers) 4–3; Lost conference finals (Celtics) 4–0		Don Nelson
1986–87	NBA	Eastern	4th	Central	3rd	50	32	.610	7	Won First round (76ers) 3–2; Lost conference semifinals (Celtics) 4–3	Ricky Pierce (SIX)	Don Nelson
1987–88	NBA	Eastern	5th	Central	4th	42	40	.512	12	Lost First round (Hawks) 3–2		Del Harris
1988–89	NBA	Eastern	5th	Central	4th	49	33	.598	14	Won First round (Hawks) 3–2; Lost conference semifinals (Pistons) 4–0		Del Harris
1989–90	NBA	Eastern	6th	Central	3rd	44	38	.537	15	Lost First round (Bulls) 3–1	Ricky Pierce (SIX)	Del Harris
1990–91	NBA	Eastern	4th	Central	3rd	48	34	.585	13	Lost First round (76ers) 3–0		Del Harris
1991–92	NBA	Eastern	11th	Central	7th	31	51	.378	36			Del Harris; Frank Hamblen
1992–93	NBA	Eastern	12th	Central	7th	28	54	.341	29			Mike Dunleavy
1993–94	NBA	Eastern	13th	Central	7th	20	62	.244	37			Mike Dunleavy
1994–95	NBA	Eastern	9th	Central	6th	34	48	.415	18			Mike Dunleavy
1995–96	NBA	Eastern	13th	Central	7th	25	57	.305	47			Mike Dunleavy
1996–97	NBA	Eastern	11th	Central	7th	33	49	.402	36			Chris Ford
1997–98	NBA	Eastern	13th	Central	7th	36	46	.439	26			Chris Ford
1998–99	NBA	Eastern	7th	Central	4th	28	22	.560	5	Lost First round (Pacers) 3–0		George Karl
1999–00	NBA	Eastern	8th	Central	5th	42	40	.512	14	Lost First round (Pacers) 3–2		George Karl
2000–01	NBA	Eastern	2nd	Central	1st	52	30	.634	—	Won First round (Magic) 3–1; Won conference semifinals (Hornets) 4–3; Lost conference finals (76ers) 4–3		George Karl
2001–02	NBA	Eastern	9th	Central	5th	41	41	.500	9			George Karl
2002–03	NBA	Eastern	7th	Central	4th	42	40	.512	8	Lost First round (Nets) 4–2		George Karl
2003–04	NBA	Eastern	6th	Central	4th	41	41	.500	20	Lost First round (Pistons) 4–1		Terry Porter
2004–05	NBA	Eastern	13th	Central	5th	30	52	.366	24			Terry Porter
2005–06	NBA	Eastern	8th	Central	5th	40	42	.488	24	Lost First round (Pistons) 4–1		Terry Stotts
2006–07	NBA	Eastern	14th	Central	5th	28	54	.341	25			Terry Stotts; Larry Krystkowiak
2007–08	NBA	Eastern	13th	Central	5th	26	56	.317	33			Larry Krystkowiak
2008–09	NBA	Eastern	12th	Central	5th	34	48	.415	32			Scott Skiles
2009–10	NBA	Eastern	6th	Central	2nd	46	36	.561	17	Lost First round (Hawks) 4–3	John Hammond (EOY)	Scott Skiles
2010–11	NBA	Eastern	9th	Central	3rd	35	47	.427	27			Scott Skiles
2011–12	NBA	Eastern	9th	Central	3rd	31	35	.469	19			Scott Skiles
2012–13	NBA	Eastern	8th	Central	3rd	38	44	.463	11½	Lost First round (Heat) 4–0		Scott Skiles; Jim Boylan
2013–14	NBA	Eastern	15th	Central	5th	15	67	.183	41			Larry Drew
2014–15	NBA	Eastern	6th	Central	3rd	41	41	.500	12	Lost First round (Bulls) 4–2		Jason Kidd
2015–16	NBA	Eastern	12th	Central	5th	33	49	.402	24			Jason Kidd
2016–17	NBA	Eastern	6th	Central	2nd	42	40	.512	11	Lost First round (Raptors) 4–2	Giannis Antetokounmpo (MIP); Malcolm Brogdon (ROY)	Jason Kidd
2017–18	NBA	Eastern	7th	Central	3rd	44	38	.537	15	Lost First round (Celtics) 4–3		Jason Kidd; Joe Prunty
2018–19	NBA	Eastern	1st	Central	1st	60	22	.732	—	Won First round (Pistons) 4–0; Won conference semifinals (Celtics) 4–1; Lost conference finals (Raptors) 4–2	Giannis Antetokounmpo (MVP); Mike Budenholzer (COY); Jon Horst (EOY)	Mike Budenholzer
2019–20	NBA	Eastern	1st	Central	1st	56	17	.767	—	Won First round (Magic) 4–1; Lost conference semifinals (Heat) 4–1	Giannis Antetokounmpo (MVP, DPOY)	Mike Budenholzer
2020–21	NBA	Eastern	3rd	Central	1st	46	26	.639	—	Won First round (Heat) 4–0; Won conference semifinals (Nets) 4–3; Won conference finals (Hawks) 4–2; Won NBA Finals (Suns) 4–2	Giannis Antetokounmpo (FMVP, ASG MVP); Jrue Holiday (SPOR)	Mike Budenholzer
2021–22	NBA	Eastern	3rd	Central	1st	51	31	.622	—	Won First round (Bulls) 4–1; Lost conference semifinals (Celtics) 4–3		Mike Budenholzer
2022–23	NBA	Eastern	1st	Central	1st	58	24	.707	—	Lost First round (Heat) 4–1		Mike Budenholzer
2023–24	NBA	Eastern	3rd	Central	1st	49	33	.598	—	Lost First round (Pacers) 4–2	Damian Lillard (ASG MVP)	Adrian Griffin; Joe Prunty; Doc Rivers
2024–25	NBA	Eastern	5th	Central	3rd	48	34	.585	16	Lost First round (Pacers) 4–1		Doc Rivers
2025–26	NBA	Eastern	11th	Central	3rd	32	50	.390	16			Doc Rivers
Regular Season Totals (1968–2026)						2,469	2,220	.527	2 NBA Championships			
Playoff Totals (1968–2026)						153	164	.483	2 NBA Championships			
All-Time Regular Season and Playoff Record						2,622	2,384	.524	2 NBA Championships			
