= List of Houston Rockets seasons =

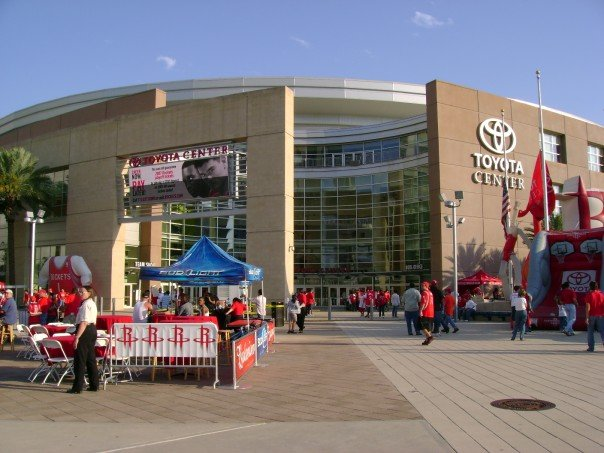
The Rockets moved into the Toyota Center at the start of the 2003–2004 season.

The Houston Rockets are an American professional basketball team based in Houston, Texas. The Rockets play in the Southwest Division of the Western Conference in the National Basketball Association (NBA). The team was established in 1967, and played in San Diego, California for four years, before moving to Houston, Texas.

In the Rockets' debut season, their win–loss record was 15–67. After drafting Elvin Hayes first overall in the 1968 NBA draft, they made their first appearance in the playoffs in 1969. After Hayes was traded, Moses Malone replaced him. Malone won two Most Valuable Player awards during his time in Houston, and led the Rockets to the 1977 Eastern Conference finals in his first year with the Rockets. He also led the Rockets to the NBA Finals in 1981, but they were defeated in six games by the Boston Celtics. Two years after advancing to the finals, the Rockets won a franchise-low 14 games.

In 1984, the Rockets drafted future Hall-of-Famer Hakeem Olajuwon, who led them to the 1986 Finals in his second year, in which they lost again to Boston. In the next seven seasons, they lost in the first round of the playoffs four times. They did not win their first championship until 1994, when Olajuwon led them to a franchise-best 58 wins, and the championship. The Rockets repeated the feat in 1995, but have not advanced to the finals since. They missed the playoffs from 1999 to 2003, and did not reach the playoffs until after they drafted Yao Ming in 2003. They did not advance past the first round of the playoffs for 13 years, until the 2008–09 NBA season. After the arrival of James Harden in 2012 and Dwight Howard the following year, the Rockets had their best seasons since the Olajuwon days, culminating in the Southwest Division title and a return to the Western Conference finals in 2015. The 2017–18 Rockets made franchise history by becoming the first Houston team ever to win 60 or more games in a regular season, finishing at 65–17.

The Rockets have played 54 seasons, and advanced to the playoffs in 34 of those seasons. They also have regular season records of .500 or better in 38 of their 54 seasons, placing them well into the upper third of NBA franchises in overall win–loss records. They have won eight division titles, and have been conference champions four times. Their overall record is 2,444 wins and 2,328 losses.

== Table key ==
| ASG MVP | All-Star Game Most Valuable Player |
| COY | Coach of the Year |
| DPOY | Defensive Player of the Year |
| EOY | Executive of the Year |
| Finish | Final position in league or division standings |
| FMVP | Finals Most Valuable Player |
| GB | Games behind first-place team in division (Note: The formula is: $\mathrm{Games}\ \mathrm{behind} = \frac{(\mathrm{Team A's}\ \mathrm{wins}-\mathrm{Team B's}\ \mathrm{wins}) + (\mathrm{Team B's}\ \mathrm{losses} - \mathrm{Team A's}\ \mathrm{losses})}{\mathrm{2}}$) |
| L | Number of regular-season losses |
| JWKC | J. Walter Kennedy Citizenship |
| MVP | Most Valuable Player |
| ROY | Rookie of the Year |
| W | Number of regular-season wins |

== Seasons ==
Note: Statistics are correct as of the 2025–26 season.

| NBA champions | Conference champions | Division champions | Playoff berth | Play-in berth |

| Season | League | Conference | Finish | Division | Finish | Wins | Losses | Win% | GB | Playoffs | Awards | Head coach |
|---|---|---|---|---|---|---|---|---|---|---|---|---|
San Diego Rockets
| 1967–68 | NBA | — | — | Western | 6th | 15 | 67 | .183 | 41 | | — | Jack McMahon |
| 1968–69 | NBA | — | — | Western | 4th | 37 | 45 | .451 | 18 | Lost Division semifinals (Hawks) 4–2 | — | Jack McMahon |
| 1969–70 | NBA | — | — | Western | 7th | 27 | 55 | .329 | 21 | | — | Jack McMahon; Alex Hannum |
| 1970–71 | NBA | Western | 7th | Pacific (Note: The Western Division was renamed to the Western Conference and split into the Midwest and Pacific divisions.) | 3rd | 40 | 42 | .488 | 8 | | — | Alex Hannum |
Houston Rockets
| 1971–72 | NBA | Western | 7th | Pacific | 4th | 34 | 48 | .415 | 35 | | — | Tex Winter |
| 1972–73 | NBA | Eastern | 5th | Central | 3rd | 33 | 49 | .402 | 19 | | — | Tex Winter; Johnny Egan |
| 1973–74 | NBA | Eastern | 6th | Central | 3rd | 32 | 50 | .390 | 15 | | — | Johnny Egan |
| 1974–75 | NBA | Eastern | 4th | Central | 2nd | 41 | 41 | .500 | 19 | Won First round (Knicks) 2–1; Lost conference semifinals (Celtics) 4–1 | — | Johnny Egan |
| 1975–76 | NBA | Eastern | 6th | Central | 3rd | 40 | 42 | .488 | 9 | | — | Johnny Egan |
| 1976–77 | NBA | Eastern | 2nd | Central | 1st | 49 | 33 | .598 | — | Won conference semifinals (Bullets) 4–2; Lost conference finals (76ers) 4–2 | Tom Nissalke (COY); Ray Patterson (EOY) | Tom Nissalke |
| 1977–78 | NBA | Eastern | 9th | Central | 6th | 28 | 54 | .341 | 24 | | — | Tom Nissalke |
| 1978–79 | NBA | Eastern | 4th | Central | 2nd | 47 | 35 | .573 | 1 | Lost First round (Hawks) 2–0 | Moses Malone (MVP); Calvin Murphy (JWKC) | Tom Nissalke |
| 1979–80 | NBA | Eastern | 4th | Central | 2nd | 41 | 41 | .500 | 9 | Won First round (Spurs) 2–1; Lost conference semifinals (Celtics) 4–0 | — | Del Harris |
| 1980–81 | NBA | Western | 6th | Midwest | 3rd (Note: Though the Rockets had the same record as the Kansas City Kings in the Midwest Division, the Rockets lost the tiebreaker and finished third.) | 40 | 42 | .488 | 12 | Won First round (Lakers) 2–1; Won conference semifinals (Spurs) 4–3; Won conference finals (Kings) 4–1; Lost NBA Finals (Celtics) 4–2 | — | Del Harris |
| 1981–82 | NBA | Western | 6th | Midwest | 3rd (Note: Though the Rockets had the same record as the Denver Nuggets in the Midwest Division, the Rockets lost the tiebreaker and finished third.) | 46 | 36 | .561 | 2 | Lost First round (SuperSonics) 2–1 | Moses Malone (MVP) | Del Harris |
| 1982–83 | NBA | Western | 12th | Midwest | 6th | 14 | 68 | .171 | 39 | | — | Del Harris |
| 1983–84 | NBA | Western | 12th | Midwest | 6th | 29 | 53 | .354 | 16 | | Ralph Sampson (ROY) | Bill Fitch |
| 1984–85 | NBA | Western | 3rd | Midwest | 2nd | 48 | 34 | .585 | 4 | Lost First round (Jazz) 3–2 | Ralph Sampson (ASG MVP) | Bill Fitch |
| 1985–86 | NBA | Western | 2nd | Midwest | 1st | 51 | 31 | .622 | — | Won First round (Kings) 3–0; Won conference semifinals (Nuggets) 4–2; Won conference finals (Lakers) 4–1; Lost NBA Finals (Celtics) 4–2 | — | Bill Fitch |
| 1986–87 | NBA | Western | 6th | Midwest | 3rd | 42 | 40 | .512 | 13 | Won First round (Trail Blazers) 3–1; Lost conference semifinals (SuperSonics) 4–2 | — | Bill Fitch |
| 1987–88 | NBA | Western | 6th | Midwest | 4th | 46 | 36 | .561 | 8 | Lost First round (Mavericks) 3–1 | — | Bill Fitch |
| 1988–89 | NBA | Western | 5th | Midwest | 2nd | 45 | 37 | .549 | 6 | Lost First round (SuperSonics) 3–1 | — | Don Chaney |
| 1989–90 | NBA | Western | 8th | Midwest | 5th | 41 | 41 | .500 | 15 | Lost First round (Lakers) 3–1 | — | Don Chaney |
| 1990–91 | NBA | Western | 6th | Midwest | 3rd | 52 | 30 | .634 | 3 | Lost First round (Lakers) 3–0 | Don Chaney (COY) | Don Chaney |
| 1991–92 | NBA | Western | 9th | Midwest | 3rd | 42 | 40 | .512 | 13 | | — | Don Chaney; Rudy Tomjanovich |
| 1992–93 | NBA | Western | 2nd | Midwest | 1st | 55 | 27 | .671 | — | Won First round (Clippers) 3–2; Lost conference semifinals (SuperSonics) 4–3 | Hakeem Olajuwon (DPOY) | Rudy Tomjanovich |
| 1993–94 | NBA | Western | 2nd | Midwest | 1st | 58 | 24 | .707 | — | Won First round (Trail Blazers) 3–1; Won conference semifinals (Suns) 4–3; Won conference finals (Jazz) 4–1; Won NBA Finals (Knicks) 4–3 | Hakeem Olajuwon (MVP, FMVP, DPOY) | Rudy Tomjanovich |
| 1994–95 | NBA | Western | 6th | Midwest | 3rd | 47 | 35 | .573 | 15 | Won First round (Jazz) 3–2; Won conference semifinals (Suns) 4–3; Won conference finals (Spurs) 4–2; Won NBA Finals (Magic) 4–0 | Hakeem Olajuwon (FMVP) | Rudy Tomjanovich |
| 1995–96 | NBA | Western | 5th | Midwest | 3rd | 48 | 34 | .585 | 11 | Won First round (Lakers) 3–1; Lost conference semifinals (SuperSonics) 4–0 | — | Rudy Tomjanovich |
| 1996–97 | NBA | Western | 3rd | Midwest | 2nd | 57 | 25 | .695 | 7 | Won First round (Timberwolves) 3–0; Won conference semifinals (SuperSonics) 4–3; Lost conference finals (Jazz) 4–2 | — | Rudy Tomjanovich |
| 1997–98 | NBA | Western | 8th | Midwest | 4th | 41 | 41 | .500 | 21 | Lost First round (Jazz) 3–2 | — | Rudy Tomjanovich |
| 1998–99 (Note: Due to a lockout, the season did not start until February 5, 1999, and all 29 teams played a shortened 50-game regular season schedule.) | NBA | Western | 5th | Midwest | 3rd | 31 | 19 | .620 | 6 | Lost First round (Lakers) 3–1 | — | Rudy Tomjanovich |
| 1999–00 | NBA | Western | 11th | Midwest | 6th | 34 | 48 | .415 | 21 | | Steve Francis (Note: Francis shared Rookie of the Year honors with Elton Brand of the Chicago Bulls.) (ROY) | Rudy Tomjanovich |
| 2000–01 | NBA | Western | 9th | Midwest | 5th | 45 | 37 | .549 | 13 | | — | Rudy Tomjanovich |
| 2001–02 | NBA | Western | 11th | Midwest | 5th | 28 | 54 | .341 | 30 | | — | Rudy Tomjanovich |
| 2002–03 | NBA | Western | 9th | Midwest | 5th | 43 | 39 | .524 | 17 | | — | Rudy Tomjanovich |
| 2003–04 | NBA | Western | 7th | Midwest | 5th | 45 | 37 | .549 | 13 | Lost First round (Lakers) 4–1 | — | Jeff Van Gundy |
| 2004–05 | NBA | Western | 5th | Southwest | 3rd | 51 | 31 | .622 | 8 | Lost First round (Mavericks) 4–3 | — | Jeff Van Gundy |
| 2005–06 | NBA | Western | 12th | Southwest | 5th | 34 | 48 | .415 | 29 | | — | Jeff Van Gundy |
| 2006–07 | NBA | Western | 5th | Southwest | 3rd | 52 | 30 | .634 | 15 | Lost First round (Jazz) 4–3 | — | Jeff Van Gundy |
| 2007–08 | NBA | Western | 5th | Southwest | 3rd | 55 | 27 | .671 | 1 | Lost First round (Jazz) 4–2 | — | Rick Adelman |
| 2008–09 | NBA | Western | 5th | Southwest | 2nd | 53 | 29 | .646 | 1 | Won First round (Trail Blazers) 4–2; Lost conference semifinals (Lakers) 4–3 | Dikembe Mutombo (JWKC) | Rick Adelman |
| 2009–10 | NBA | Western | 9th | Southwest | 3rd | 42 | 40 | .512 | 13 | | Aaron Brooks (MIP) | Rick Adelman |
| 2010–11 | NBA | Western | 9th | Southwest | 5th | 43 | 39 | .524 | 18 | | — | Rick Adelman |
| 2011–12 (Note: Due to a lockout, the season did not start until December 25, 2011 and all 30 teams played a shortened 66 game regular season schedule.) | NBA | Western | 9th | Southwest | 4th | 34 | 32 | .515 | 16 | | — | Kevin McHale |
| 2012–13 | NBA | Western | 8th | Southwest | 3rd | 45 | 37 | .549 | 15 | Lost First round (Thunder) 4–2 | — | Kevin McHale |
| 2013–14 | NBA | Western | 4th | Southwest | 2nd | 54 | 28 | .659 | 8 | Lost First round (Trail Blazers) 4–2 | — | Kevin McHale |
| 2014–15 | NBA | Western | 2nd | Southwest | 1st | 56 | 26 | .683 | — | Won First round (Mavericks) 4–1; Won conference semifinals (Clippers) 4–3; Lost conference finals (Warriors) 4–1 | — | Kevin McHale |
| 2015–16 | NBA | Western | 8th | Southwest | 4th | 41 | 41 | .500 | 26 | Lost First round (Warriors) 4–1 | — | Kevin McHale; J. B. Bickerstaff |
| 2016–17 | NBA | Western | 3rd | Southwest | 2nd | 55 | 27 | .671 | 6 | Won First round (Thunder) 4–1; Lost conference semifinals (Spurs) 4–2 | Eric Gordon (SIX); Mike D'Antoni (COY) | Mike D'Antoni |
| 2017–18 | NBA | Western | 1st | Southwest | 1st | 65 | 17 | .793 | — | Won First round (Timberwolves) 4–1; Won conference semifinals (Jazz) 4–1; Lost conference finals (Warriors) 4–3 | James Harden (MVP); Daryl Morey (EOY) | Mike D'Antoni |
| 2018–19 | NBA | Western | 4th | Southwest | 1st | 53 | 29 | .646 | — | Won First round (Jazz) 4–1; Lost conference semifinals (Warriors) 4–2 | — | Mike D'Antoni |
| 2019–20 (Note: Season suspended mid-season due to the global COVID-19 pandemic) | NBA | Western | 4th | Southwest | 1st | 44 | 28 | .611 | — | Won First round (Thunder) 4–3; Lost conference semifinals (Lakers) 4–1 | — | Mike D'Antoni |
| 2020–21 | NBA | Western | 15th | Southwest | 5th | 17 | 55 | .236 | 25 | | — | Stephen Silas |
| 2021–22 | NBA | Western | 15th | Southwest | 5th | 20 | 62 | .244 | 44 | | — | Stephen Silas |
| 2022–23 | NBA | Western | 14th | Southwest | 4th | 22 | 60 | .268 | 30.5 | | — | Stephen Silas |
| 2023–24 | NBA | Western | 11th | Southwest | 3rd | 41 | 41 | .500 | 9 | | — | Ime Udoka |
| 2024–25 | NBA | Western | 2nd | Southwest | 1st | 52 | 30 | .634 | — | Lost First round (Warriors) 4–3 | — | Ime Udoka |
| 2025–26 | NBA | Western | 5th | Southwest | 2nd | 52 | 30 | .634 | 10 | Lost First round (Lakers) 4–2 | — | Ime Udoka |
| Total (59 seasons) | | | | | | 2,473 | 2,297 | .518 | 2 NBA Championships | | | 16 Head Coaches |

=== All-time records ===
Complete through the 2025–26 NBA season.

| Statistic | Wins | Losses | Win% |
|---|---|---|---|
| San Diego Rockets regular season record (1968–1971) | 119 | 209 | .363 |
| Houston Rockets regular season record (1971–present) | 2,354 | 2,088 | .530 |
| All-time regular season record (1968–present) | 2,473 | 2,297 | .518 |
| San Diego Rockets post-season record (1969) | 2 | 4 | .333 |
| Houston Rockets post-season record (1975–present) | 161 | 168 | .489 |
| All-time post-season record (1969–present) | 163 | 172 | .487 |
| All-time regular and post-season record | 2,636 | 2,469 | .516 |
