= List of Miami Heat seasons =

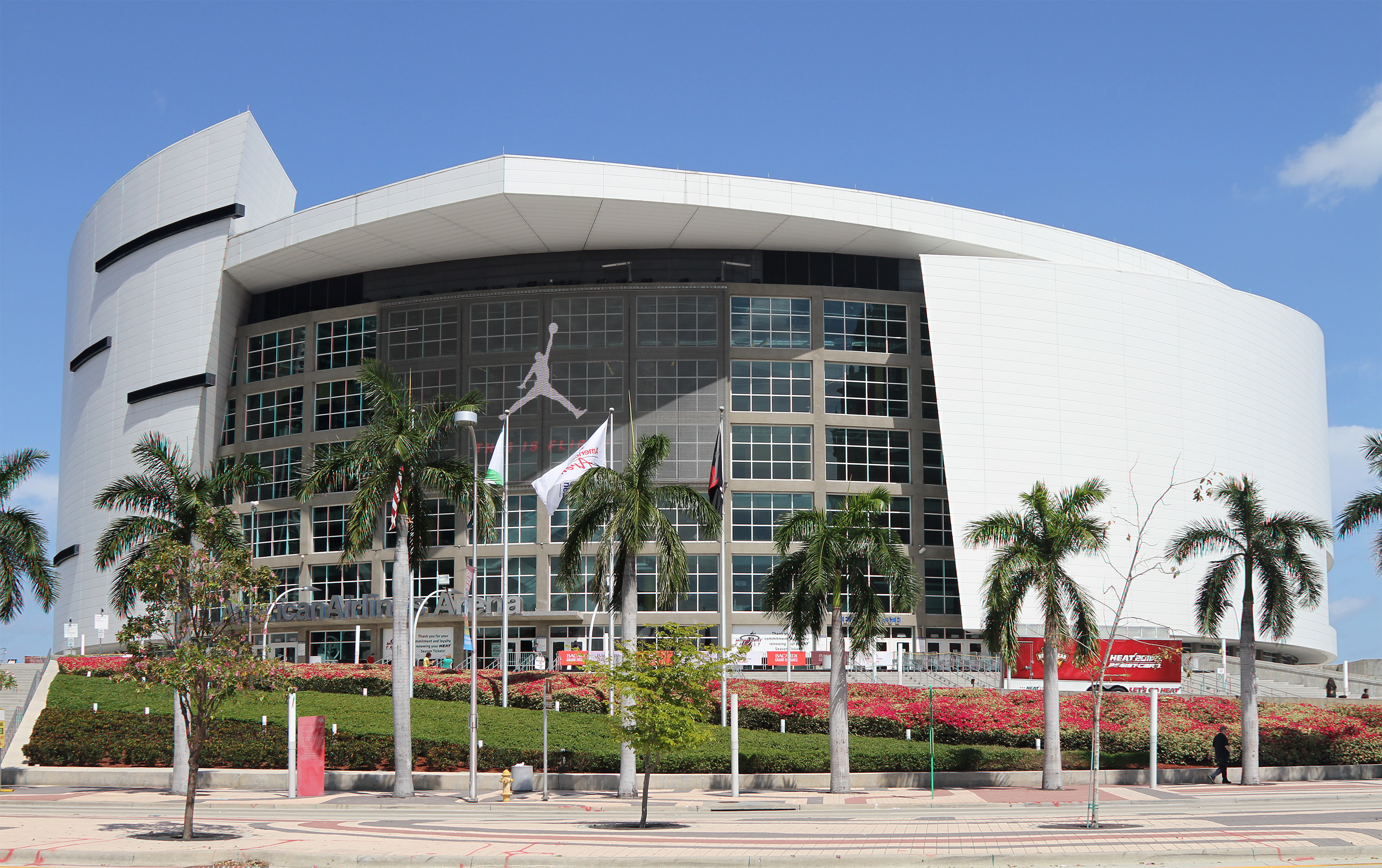
Kaseya Center has been home to the Heat since 2000

The Miami Heat are a professional basketball team based in Miami that competes in the National Basketball Association (NBA). The Heat formed in 1988 as an expansion franchise and have since made the playoffs 24 out of 35 seasons, captured 16 division titles, seven conference titles, and three NBA championships. Along with the Orlando Magic, they are one of two NBA teams representing the state of Florida. As of the 2024–25 season, they are one of two franchises formed after 1980 to win the NBA title, along with the Toronto Raptors. They defeated the Dallas Mavericks in the 2006 NBA Finals, the Oklahoma City Thunder in the 2012 NBA Finals, and the San Antonio Spurs in the 2013 NBA Finals.

== Table key ==
ASG MVP	All-Star Game Most Valuable Player
COY	Coach of the Year
DPOY	Defensive Player of the Year
Finish	Final position in league or division standings
GB	Games behind first-place team in division (Note: The formula is as follows: $\mathrm{Games}\ \mathrm{behind} = \frac{(\mathrm{Team A's}\ \mathrm{wins}-\mathrm{Team B's}\ \mathrm{wins}) + (\mathrm{Team B's}\ \mathrm{losses} - \mathrm{Team A's}\ \mathrm{losses})}{\mathrm{2}}$)
L	Number of regular season losses
EOY	Executive of the Year
FMVP	Finals Most Valuable Player
JWKC	J. Walter Kennedy Citizenship
MVP	Most Valuable Player
ROY	Rookie of the Year
SIX	Sixth Man of the Year
MIP	Most Improved Player Award
W	Number of regular season wins

== Seasons ==
Note: Statistics are correct as of the 2025–26 season.

NBA champions	Conference champions	Division champions	Playoff berth	Play-in berth

Season	League	Conference	Finish	Division	Finish	Wins	Losses	Win%	GB	Playoffs	Awards	Head coach
1988–89	NBA	Western	13th	Midwest	6th	15	67	.183	42	—	—	Ron Rothstein
1989–90	NBA	Eastern	11th	Atlantic	5th	18	64	.220	41	—	Rony Seikaly (MIP)	Ron Rothstein
1990–91	NBA	Eastern	13th	Atlantic	6th	24	58	.293	37	—	—	Ron Rothstein
1991–92	NBA	Eastern	8th	Atlantic	4th	38	44	.463	29	Lost first round (Bulls) 3–0	—	Kevin Loughery
1992–93	NBA	Eastern	11th	Atlantic	5th	36	46	.439	24	—	—	Kevin Loughery
1993–94	NBA	Eastern	8th	Atlantic	4th	42	40	.512	15	Lost first round (Hawks) 3–2	—	Kevin Loughery
1994–95	NBA	Eastern	10th	Atlantic	4th	32	50	.390	25	—	—	Kevin Loughery; Alvin Gentry
1995–96	NBA	Eastern	8th	Atlantic	3rd	42	40	.512	30	Lost first round (Bulls) 3–0	—	Pat Riley
1996–97	NBA	Eastern	2nd	Atlantic	1st	61	21	.744	8	Won first round (Magic) 3–2; Won conference semifinals (Knicks) 4–3; Lost conference finals (Bulls) 4–1	Isaac Austin (MIP); Pat Riley (COY); P.J. Brown (JWKC)	Pat Riley
1997–98	NBA	Eastern	2nd	Atlantic	1st	55	27	.671	7	Lost first round (Knicks) 3–2	—	Pat Riley
1998–99 (Note: Due to a lockout, the season did not start until February 5, 1999, and all 29 teams played a shortened 50-game regular-season schedule.)	NBA	Eastern	1st	Atlantic	1st	33	17	.660	—	Lost first round (Knicks) 3–2	Alonzo Mourning (DPOY)	Pat Riley
1999–00	NBA	Eastern	2nd	Atlantic	1st	52	30	.634	4	Won first round (Pistons) 3–0; Lost conference semifinals (Knicks) 4–3	Alonzo Mourning (DPOY)	Pat Riley
2000–01	NBA	Eastern	3rd	Atlantic	2nd	50	32	.610	6	Lost first round (Hornets) 3–0	—	Pat Riley
2001–02	NBA	Eastern	11th	Atlantic	6th	36	46	.439	16	—	Alonzo Mourning (JWKC)	Pat Riley
2002–03	NBA	Eastern	13th	Atlantic	7th	25	57	.305	25	—	—	Pat Riley
2003–04	NBA	Eastern	4th	Atlantic	2nd	42	40	.512	19	Won first round (Hornets) 4–3; Lost conference semifinals (Pacers) 4–2	—	Stan Van Gundy
2004–05	NBA	Eastern	1st	Southeast	1st	59	23	.720	—	Won first round (Nets) 4–0; Won conference semifinals (Wizards) 4–0; Lost conference finals (Pistons) 4–3	—	Stan Van Gundy
2005–06	NBA	Eastern	2nd	Southeast	1st	52	30	.634	12	Won first round (Bulls) 4–2; Won conference semifinals (Nets) 4–1; Won conference finals (Pistons) 4–2; Won NBA Finals (Mavericks) 4–2	Dwyane Wade (FMVP)	Stan Van Gundy; Pat Riley
2006–07	NBA	Eastern	4th	Southeast	1st	44	38	.537	9	Lost first round (Bulls) 4–0	—	Pat Riley
2007–08	NBA	Eastern	15th	Southeast	5th	15	67	.183	51	—	—	Pat Riley
2008–09	NBA	Eastern	5th	Southeast	3rd	43	39	.524	23	Lost first round (Hawks) 4–3	—	Erik Spoelstra
2009–10	NBA	Eastern	5th	Southeast	3rd	47	35	.573	14	Lost first round (Celtics) 4–1	Dwyane Wade (ASG MVP)	Erik Spoelstra
2010–11	NBA	Eastern	2nd	Southeast	1st	58	24	.707	4	Won first round (76ers) 4–1; Won conference semifinals (Celtics) 4–1; Won conference finals (Bulls) 4–1; Lost NBA Finals (Mavericks) 4–2	Pat Riley (EOY)	Erik Spoelstra
2011–12 (Note: Due to a lockout, the season did not start until December 25, 2011 and all 30 teams played a shortened 66-game regular-season schedule.)	NBA	Eastern	2nd	Southeast	1st	46	20	.697	4	Won first round (Knicks) 4–1; Won conference semifinals (Pacers) 4–2; Won conference finals (Celtics) 4–3; Won NBA Finals (Thunder) 4–1	LeBron James (MVP, FMVP)	Erik Spoelstra
2012–13	NBA	Eastern	1st	Southeast	1st	66	16	.805	—	Won first round (Bucks) 4–0; Won conference semifinals (Bulls) 4–1; Won conference finals (Pacers) 4–3; Won NBA Finals (Spurs) 4–3	LeBron James (MVP, FMVP)	Erik Spoelstra
2013–14	NBA	Eastern	2nd	Southeast	1st	54	28	.659	2	Won first round (Bobcats) 4–0; Won conference semifinals (Nets) 4–1; Won conference finals (Pacers) 4–2; Lost NBA Finals (Spurs) 4–1	—	Erik Spoelstra
2014–15	NBA	Eastern	10th	Southeast	3rd	37	45	.451	23	—	—	Erik Spoelstra
2015–16	NBA	Eastern	3rd	Southeast	1st	48	34	.585	9	Won first round (Hornets) 4–3; Lost conference semifinals (Raptors) 4–3	—	Erik Spoelstra
2016–17	NBA	Eastern	9th	Southeast	3rd	41	41	.500	12	—	—	Erik Spoelstra
2017–18	NBA	Eastern	6th	Southeast	1st	44	38	.537	15	Lost first round (76ers) 4–1	—	Erik Spoelstra
2018–19	NBA	Eastern	10th	Southeast	3rd	39	43	.476	21	—	—	Erik Spoelstra
2019–20 (Note: Due to COVID-19 pandemic, season was suspended on March 11, 2020 and play resumed on July 30, 2020.)	NBA	Eastern	5th	Southeast	1st	44	29	.603	12	Won first round (Pacers) 4–0; Won conference semifinals (Bucks) 4–1; Won conference finals (Celtics) 4–2; Lost NBA Finals (Lakers) 4–2	—	Erik Spoelstra
2020–21 (Note: Due to COVID-19 pandemic, the season did not start until December 22, 2020 and all 30 teams played a shortened 72-game regular-season schedule.)	NBA	Eastern	6th	Southeast	2nd	40	32	.556	9	Lost first round (Bucks) 4–0	—	Erik Spoelstra
2021–22	NBA	Eastern	1st	Southeast	1st	53	29	.646	—	Won first round (Hawks) 4–1; Won conference semifinals (76ers) 4–2; Lost conference finals (Celtics) 4–3	Tyler Herro (SIX)	Erik Spoelstra
2022–23	NBA	Eastern	8th (Note: Fell to the 8th seed after losing to the Atlanta Hawks in the NBA play-in tournament.)	Southeast	1st	44	38	.537	14	Won first round (Bucks) 4–1; Won conference semifinals (Knicks) 4–2; Won conference finals (Celtics) 4–3; Lost NBA Finals (Nuggets) 4–1	—	Erik Spoelstra
2023–24	NBA	Eastern	8th	Southeast	2nd	46	36	.561	18	Lost first round (Celtics) 4–1	—	Erik Spoelstra
2024–25	NBA	Eastern	8th (Note: Rose to the 8th seed after defeating the Chicago Bulls and Atlanta Hawks in the NBA play-in tournament.)	Southeast	3rd	37	45	.451	27	Lost first round (Cavaliers) 4–0	—	Erik Spoelstra
2025–26	NBA	Eastern	10th	Southeast	4th	43	39	.524	17	—	—	Erik Spoelstra
37 seasons											List of awards	

== All-time records ==
Statistics are correct as of the conclusion of the 2025–26 NBA season.

Statistic	Wins	Losses	W–L%
All-time regular season record	1,601	1,448	.525
All-time postseason record	163	136	.545
All-time regular and postseason record	1,764	1,584	.527
