= List of NBA franchise postseason droughts =

This is a list of National Basketball Association (NBA) franchise post-season appearance droughts. This list includes the all-time and the active consecutive non-playoffs. Aside from the NBA playoff appearance droughts, this list also includes droughts of series wins, appearances in the NBA Finals and NBA championship wins. The oldest franchise to never win the championship is the Suns (54 seasons), while the Royals/Kings and the Hawks have even longer championship droughts (71 and 64 seasons, respectively). Five franchises have never been to the NBA Finals, tied with the National Hockey League for the highest number among the major North American sports. The oldest such team is the Braves/Clippers franchise (52 seasons); the Kings and the Hawks have appearance droughts that are even longer (71 and 61 seasons, respectively). The longest a franchise has gone without appearing in the playoffs at all is 16 seasons: the Kings franchise from 2006 to 2023.

Of the 20 franchises that have won an NBA championship, 5 have droughts of 41 seasons or more, which is to say that the past 40 championships have been shared among only 15 franchises: the Lakers (8), Bulls (6), Spurs (5), Warriors (4), Pistons (3), Celtics (3), Heat (3), Rockets (2), Mavericks (1), Cavaliers (1), Raptors (1), Bucks (1), Nuggets (1), Thunder (1), and Knicks (1). By contrast, the other three major North American sports have each had at least 18 franchises become champions over the same period of time.

== Active droughts ==
=== NBA Playoffs appearance droughts ===
Appearance droughts updated through May 30, 2026.
Playoff picture at NBA.com.
Play-in games do not count as a playoff game or series.

^	Longest drought in team history
†	Tied for longest drought in team history

Seasons	Team	Last appearance in NBA playoffs	Reference
10	Charlotte Hornets ^	2016 First Round	
5	Washington Wizards	2021 First Round	
4	Chicago Bulls	2022 First Round	
4	Utah Jazz	2022 First Round	
3	Brooklyn Nets	2023 First Round	
3	Sacramento Kings	2023 First Round	
2	New Orleans Pelicans	2024 First Round	
2	Dallas Mavericks	2024 NBA Finals	
1	Milwaukee Bucks	2025 First Round	
1	Miami Heat	2025 First Round	
1	Los Angeles Clippers	2025 First Round	
1	Golden State Warriors	2025 Conference Semifinals	
1	Memphis Grizzlies	2025 First Round	
1	Indiana Pacers	2025 NBA Finals	
2026 Playoff teams
0	Boston Celtics	2026 First Round	
0	Toronto Raptors	2026 First Round	
0	Atlanta Hawks	2026 First Round	
0	Orlando Magic	2026 First Round	
0	Denver Nuggets	2026 First Round	
0	Houston Rockets	2026 First Round	
0	Portland Trail Blazers	2026 First Round	
0	Phoenix Suns	2026 First Round	
0	Minnesota Timberwolves	2026 Conference Semifinals	
0	Los Angeles Lakers	2026 Conference Semifinals	
0	Philadelphia 76ers	2026 Conference Semifinals	
0	Detroit Pistons	2026 Conference Semifinals	
0	Oklahoma City Thunder	2026 Conference Finals	
0	Cleveland Cavaliers	2026 Conference Finals	
0	New York Knicks	2026 NBA Finals	
0	San Antonio Spurs	2026 NBA Finals	

=== NBA Playoffs series win droughts ===
Droughts updated through May 30, 2026.
Playoff picture at NBA.com

^	Longest drought in team history
♦	Most consecutive series losses in team history

Current Playoff series loss streak
Seasons since win	Team	Last series win in NBA Playoffs	Losing streak	Series losses – teams	Ref
22^{[a]}	Charlotte Hornets ^	2002 Eastern First Round	4 ♦	2002 New Jersey; 2010 Orlando; 2014 Miami; 2016 Miami	
22	Sacramento Kings ^	2004 Western First Round	4	2004 Minnesota; 2005 Seattle; 2006 San Antonio; 2023 Golden State	
16	Orlando Magic ^	2010 Eastern Semifinals	8 ♦	2010 Boston; 2011 Atlanta; 2012 Indiana; 2019 Toronto; 2020 Milwaukee; 2024 Cleveland; 2025 Boston; 2026 Detroit	
11	Chicago Bulls ^	2015 Eastern First Round	3	2015 Cleveland; 2017 Boston; 2022 Milwaukee	
9	Washington Wizards	2017 Eastern First Round	3	2017 Boston; 2018 Toronto; 2021 Philadelphia	
8	New Orleans Pelicans	2018 Western First Round	3	2018 Golden State; 2022 Phoenix; 2024 Oklahoma City	
7	Portland Trail Blazers	2019 Western Semifinals	4	2019 Golden State; 2020 L. A. Lakers; 2021 Denver; 2026 San Antonio	
6	Toronto Raptors	2020 Eastern First Round	3	2020 Boston; 2022 Philadelphia; 2026 Cleveland	
6	Houston Rockets	2020 Western First Round	3	2020 L. A. Lakers; 2025 Golden State; 2026 L. A. Lakers	
5	Utah Jazz	2021 Western First Round	2	2021 L. A. Clippers; 2022 Dallas	
5	Brooklyn Nets	2021 Eastern First Round	3	2021 Milwaukee; 2022 Boston; 2023 Philadelphia	
5	Los Angeles Clippers	2021 Western Semifinals	4	2021 Phoenix; 2023 Phoenix; 2024 Dallas; 2025 Denver	
5	Atlanta Hawks	2021 Eastern Semifinals	4	2021 Milwaukee; 2022 Miami; 2023 Boston; 2026 New York	
4	Milwaukee Bucks	2022 Eastern First Round	4	2022 Boston; 2023 Miami; 2024 Indiana; 2025 Indiana	
4	Memphis Grizzlies	2022 Western First Round	3	2022 Golden State; 2023 L. A. Lakers; 2025 Oklahoma City	
3	Phoenix Suns	2023 Western First Round	3	2023 Denver; 2024 Minnesota; 2026 Oklahoma City	
3	Miami Heat	2023 Eastern Conference Finals	3	2023 Denver; 2024 Boston; 2025 Cleveland	
2	Dallas Mavericks	2024 Western Conference Finals	1	2024 Boston	
1	Golden State Warriors	2025 Western First Round	1	2025 Minnesota	
1	Boston Celtics	2025 Eastern First Round	2	2025 New York; 2026 Philadelphia	
1	Denver Nuggets	2025 Western First Round	2	2025 Oklahoma City; 2026 Minnesota	
1	Indiana Pacers	2025 Eastern Conference Finals	1	2025 Oklahoma City	
	2026 Playoff Series	Winners			
0	Minnesota Timberwolves	2026 Western First Round	0	2026 San Antonio	
0	Los Angeles Lakers	2026 Western First Round	0	2026 Oklahoma City	
0	Philadelphia 76ers	2026 Eastern First Round	0	2026 New York	
0	Detroit Pistons	2026 Eastern First Round	0	2026 Cleveland	
0	Cleveland Cavaliers	2026 Eastern Semifinals	0	2026 New York	
0	Oklahoma City Thunder	2026 Western Semifinals	0	2026 San Antonio	
0	New York Knicks	2026 Eastern Conference Finals	0	4-series win streak	
0	San Antonio Spurs	2026 Western Conference Finals	0	2026 New York	

^{a} Includes 10 seasons as the Charlotte Bobcats. Charlotte was also inactive for two years following the 2001–02 season.

=== NBA Conference Finals appearance droughts ===
^	Longest drought in team history

Seasons	Team	Last appearance in Conference Finals	Result	Reference
47	Washington Wizards ^^{[c]}	1979	Won vs. San Antonio	
38	Charlotte Hornets ^	Never (enfranchised 1988)		
25	Philadelphia 76ers ^	2001	Won vs. Milwaukee	
24	Sacramento Kings	2002	Lost vs. L.A. Lakers	
24	New Orleans Pelicans ^	Never (enfranchised 2002)		
23	Brooklyn Nets ^{[d]}	2003	Won vs. Detroit	
19	Utah Jazz	2007	Lost vs. San Antonio	
18	Detroit Pistons	2008	Lost vs. Boston	
16	Orlando Magic	2010	Lost vs. Boston	
15	Chicago Bulls	2011	Lost vs. Miami	
13	Memphis Grizzlies	2013	Lost vs. San Antonio	
8	Houston Rockets	2018	Lost vs. Golden State	
7	Toronto Raptors	2019	Won vs. Milwaukee	
7	Portland Trail Blazers	2019	Lost vs. Golden State	
5	Phoenix Suns	2021	Won vs. L.A. Clippers	
5	Los Angeles Clippers	2021	Lost vs. Phoenix	
5	Milwaukee Bucks	2021	Won vs. Atlanta	
5	Atlanta Hawks	2021	Lost vs. Milwaukee	
4	Golden State Warriors	2022	Won vs. Dallas	
3	Denver Nuggets	2023	Won vs. L.A. Lakers	
3	Los Angeles Lakers	2023	Lost vs. Denver	
3	Miami Heat	2023	Won vs. Boston	
2	Boston Celtics	2024	Won vs. Indiana	
2	Dallas Mavericks	2024	Won vs. Minnesota	
1	Indiana Pacers	2025	Won vs. New York	
1	Minnesota Timberwolves	2025	Lost vs. Oklahoma City	
	2026 Conference Finalists			
0	New York Knicks	2026	Won vs. Cleveland	
0	Oklahoma City Thunder	2026	Lost vs. San Antonio	
0	San Antonio Spurs	2026	Won vs. Oklahoma City	
0	Cleveland Cavaliers	2026	Lost vs. New York	

=== NBA Finals appearance droughts ===
Seasons	Team	Last appearance in NBA Finals	Result	Reference
75	Sacramento Kings	1951^{[a]}	Won vs. New York	
65	Atlanta Hawks	1961^{[b]}	Lost vs. Boston	
56	Los Angeles Clippers	Never (enfranchised 1970)		
47	Washington Wizards^{[c]}	1979	Lost vs. Seattle	
38	Charlotte Hornets	Never (enfranchised 1988)		
37	Minnesota Timberwolves	Never (enfranchised 1989)		
34	Portland Trail Blazers	1992	Lost vs. Chicago	
31	Houston Rockets	1995	Won vs. Orlando	
31	Memphis Grizzlies	Never (enfranchised 1995)		
28	Utah Jazz	1998	Lost vs. Chicago	
28	Chicago Bulls	1998	Won vs. Utah	
25	Philadelphia 76ers	2001	Lost vs. L. A. Lakers	
24	New Orleans Pelicans	Never (enfranchised 2002)		
23	Brooklyn Nets^{[d]}	2003	Lost vs. San Antonio	
21	Detroit Pistons	2005	Lost vs. San Antonio	
17	Orlando Magic	2009	Lost vs. L. A. Lakers	
8	Cleveland Cavaliers	2018	Lost vs. Golden State	
7	Toronto Raptors	2019	Won vs. Golden State	
6	Los Angeles Lakers	2020	Won vs. Miami	
5	Milwaukee Bucks	2021	Won vs. Phoenix	
5	Phoenix Suns	2021	Lost vs. Milwaukee	
4	Golden State Warriors	2022	Won vs. Boston	
3	Denver Nuggets	2023	Won vs. Miami	
3	Miami Heat	2023	Lost vs. Denver	
2	Dallas Mavericks	2024	Lost vs. Boston	
2	Boston Celtics	2024	Won vs. Dallas	
1	Oklahoma City Thunder	2025	Won vs. Indiana	
1	Indiana Pacers	2025	Lost vs. Oklahoma City	
	2026 Finalists			
0	New York Knicks	2026	Won vs. San Antonio	
0	San Antonio Spurs	2026	Lost vs. New York	

- ^{a} The Sacramento Kings last appeared in the 1951 NBA Finals as the Rochester Royals. Predates NBA-ABA merger.
- ^{b} The Atlanta Hawks last appeared in the 1961 NBA Finals as the St. Louis Hawks. Predates NBA-ABA merger.
- ^{c} The Washington Wizards last appeared in the 1979 Conference Finals and NBA Finals as the Washington Bullets.
- ^{d} The Brooklyn Nets last appeared in the 2003 Conference Finals and NBA Finals as the New Jersey Nets.

=== NBA championship title droughts ===
Seasons	Team	Last NBA championship	Reference
Walter A. Brown Trophy ^{[c]}
75	Sacramento Kings	1951^{[a]}	
68	Atlanta Hawks	1958^{[b]}	
58	Phoenix Suns	Never (enfranchised 1968)	
56	Los Angeles Clippers	Never (enfranchised 1970)	
52	Utah Jazz	Never (enfranchised 1974)	
50	Brooklyn Nets	Never (joined NBA in 1976)	
50	Indiana Pacers	Never (joined NBA in 1976)	
Larry O'Brien Championship Trophy
49	Portland Trail Blazers	1977	
48	Washington Wizards^{[d]}	1978	
43	Philadelphia 76ers	1983	
37	Orlando Magic	Never (enfranchised 1989)	
37	Minnesota Timberwolves	Never (enfranchised 1989)	
38	Charlotte Hornets	Never (enfranchised 1988)	
31	Houston Rockets	1995	
31	Memphis Grizzlies	Never (enfranchised 1995)	
28	Chicago Bulls	1998	
24	New Orleans Pelicans	Never (enfranchised 2002)	
22	Detroit Pistons	2004	
15	Dallas Mavericks	2011	
13	Miami Heat	2013	
12	San Antonio Spurs	2014	
10	Cleveland Cavaliers	2016	
7	Toronto Raptors	2019	
6	Los Angeles Lakers	2020	
5	Milwaukee Bucks	2021	
4	Golden State Warriors	2022	
3	Denver Nuggets	2023	
2	Boston Celtics	2024	
1	Oklahoma City Thunder	2025	
0	New York Knicks	2026	

- ^{a} The Sacramento Kings last won an NBA championship in 1951 as the Rochester Royals.
- ^{b} The Atlanta Hawks last won an NBA championship in 1958 as the St. Louis Hawks.
- ^{c} Predates the NBA-ABA merger.
- ^{d} The Washington Wizards last won an NBA championship in 1978 as the Washington Bullets.

== All-time droughts ==
=== NBA championship droughts ===
Team	Seasons	Last title	Drought	Next title
Sacramento Kings (Note: Previously the Rochester Royals, Cincinnati Royals, Kansas City–Omaha Kings and Kansas City Kings.)	74	1951	1951–present	—N/a
Atlanta Hawks (Note: Previously the St. Louis Hawks.)	67	1958	1958–present	—N/a
Phoenix Suns	57	—N/a	1968–present	—N/a
Los Angeles Clippers (Note: Previously the Buffalo Braves and San Diego Clippers.)	55	—N/a	1970–present	—N/a
New York Knicks	52	1973	1973–2025	2026
Utah Jazz (Note: Previously the New Orleans Jazz.)	51	—N/a	1974–present	—N/a
Brooklyn Nets (Note: Previously the New York Nets and New Jersey Nets.)	49	—N/a	1976–present	—N/a
Milwaukee Bucks	49	1971	1971–2020	2021
Indiana Pacers	48	—N/a	1976–present	—N/a
Portland Trail Blazers	48	1977	1977–present	—N/a
Washington Wizards (Note: Previously the Washington Bullets.)	47	1978	1978–present	—N/a
Denver Nuggets	46	—N/a	1976–2022	2023
Cleveland Cavaliers	45	—N/a	1970–2015	2016
Oklahoma City Thunder (Note: Previously the Seattle SuperSonics.)	45	1979	1979–2024	2025
Philadelphia 76ers	42	1983	1983–present	—N/a
Detroit Pistons (Note: Previously the Fort Wayne Pistons.)	40	—N/a	1948–1988	1989
Golden State Warriors	39	1975	1975–2014	2015
Charlotte Hornets (Note: Previously the Charlotte Bobcats.)	37 (Note: Includes two seasons when the team was inactive from 2002 to 2004.)	—N/a	1988–present	—N/a
Minnesota Timberwolves	36	—N/a	1989–present	—N/a
Orlando Magic	35	—N/a	1989–present	—N/a
Memphis Grizzlies (Note: Previously the Vancouver Grizzlies.)	30	—N/a	1995–present	—N/a
Dallas Mavericks	30	—N/a	1980–2010	2011

=== Closest approaches without winning ===
Updated through the 2025 NBA Finals.

Last team to leave list – Denver Nuggets 2023
Team	Conference Quarter-Final appearances	Conference Semi-Final appearances	Conference Final appearances	NBA Final appearances	Fewest wins short of NBA Championship
Indiana Pacers	29	12	10	2	1 win short : 2025
Phoenix Suns	33	21	10	3	2 wins short : 1976, 1993, 2021
Utah Jazz	31	17	6	2	2 wins short : 1997, 1998
Brooklyn Nets	24	8	2	2	2 wins short : 2003
Orlando Magic	18	5	4	2	3 wins short : 2009
Los Angeles Clippers	19	9	1		6 wins short : 2021
Minnesota Timberwolves	13	3	3		6 wins short : 2004
Memphis Grizzlies	14	4	1		8 wins short : 2013
New Orleans Pelicans	9	2			9 wins short : 2008
Charlotte Hornets	10	4			9 wins short : 2001

=== Longest post-season droughts in team history ===
Updated through the 2025–26 season.

^	Denotes active drought

Team	Longest streak with no post-season appearances	Seasons
Sacramento Kings	2006–07 through 2021–22	16
Los Angeles Clippers	1976–77 through 1990–91	15
Minnesota Timberwolves	2004–05 through 2016–17	13
Golden State Warriors	1994–95 through 2005–06	12
Dallas Mavericks	1990–91 through 1999–2000	10
Phoenix Suns	2010–11 through 2019–20	10
Charlotte Hornets ^	2016–17 through 2025–26	10
Utah Jazz	1974–75 through 1982–83	9
Washington Wizards	1988–89 through 1995–96	8
Memphis Grizzlies	1995–96 through 2002–03	8
Denver Nuggets	1995–96 through 2002–03	8
Atlanta Hawks	1999–2000 through 2006–07	8
New York Knicks	1959–60 through 1965–66; 2013–14 through 2019–20	7
Oklahoma City Thunder	1967–68 through 1973–74	7
Milwaukee Bucks	1991–92 through 1997–98	7
Philadelphia 76ers	1991–92 through 1997–98	7
Cleveland Cavaliers	1998–99 through 2004–05	7
Portland Trail Blazers	1970–71 through 1975–76	6
Detroit Pistons	1977–78 through 1982–83; 2009–10 through 2014–15	6
Boston Celtics	1995–96 through 2000–01	6
Chicago Bulls	1998–99 through 2003–04	6
Orlando Magic	2012–13 through 2017–18	6
Los Angeles Lakers	2013–14 through 2018–19	6
San Antonio Spurs	2019–20 through 2024–25	6
Houston Rockets	1969–70 through 1973–74	5
Indiana Pacers	1981–82 through 1985–86	5
Brooklyn Nets	1986–87 through 1990–91; 2007–08 through 2011–12	5
Toronto Raptors	2008–09 through 2012–13	5
Miami Heat	1988–89 through 1990–91	3
New Orleans Pelicans	2004–05 through 2006–07; 2011–12 through 2013–14; 2018–19 through 2020–21	3

=== Longest post-season series win droughts in team history ===
Updated through the 2025–26 season.

^	Denotes active drought

Team	Longest streak with no post-season series wins	Seasons
Los Angeles Clippers	1976–77 through 2004–05	29
Washington Wizards	1982–83 through 2003–04	22
Charlotte Hornets ^	2004–05 through 2025–26	22
Sacramento Kings ^	2004–05 through 2025–26	22
Minnesota Timberwolves	2004–05 through 2022–23	19
Indiana Pacers	1976–77 through 1992–93	17
Brooklyn Nets	1984–85 through 2000–01	17
Milwaukee Bucks	2001–02 through 2017–18	17
Detroit Pistons	2008–09 through 2024–25	17
New York Knicks	1953–54 through 1967–68	15
Cleveland Cavaliers	1976–77 through 1990–91	15
Golden State Warriors	1991–92 through 2005–06	15
Memphis Grizzlies	1995–96 through 2009–10	15
Denver Nuggets	1994–95 through 2007–08	14
Toronto Raptors	2001–02 through 2014–15	14
Orlando Magic ^	2010–11 through 2025–26	15
Portland Trail Blazers	2000–01 through 2012–13	13
Dallas Mavericks	1988–89 through 1999–2000	12
Houston Rockets	1997–98 through 2007–08	11
Phoenix Suns	2010–11 through 2019–20	10
Chicago Bulls ^	2015–16 through 2025–26	11
Utah Jazz	1974–75 through 1982–83	9
Boston Celtics	1992–93 through 2000–01	9
Atlanta Hawks	1999–2000 through 2007–08	9
New Orleans Pelicans	2008–09 through 2016–17	9
Philadelphia 76ers	1968–69 through 1975–76; 2003–04 through 2010–11	8
Miami Heat	1988–89 through 1995–96	8
San Antonio Spurs	2017–18 through 2024–25	8
Oklahoma City Thunder	1967–68 through 1973–74; 2016–17 through 2022–23	7
Los Angeles Lakers	2012–13 through 2018–19	7

=== Longest NBA Playoffs appearance droughts ===
Appearance droughts updated through the 2025–26 season.

^	Denotes active drought

Team	Streak (seasons)	NBA Playoffs appearance droughts	Reference
Sacramento Kings	16	2007–2022	
Buffalo Braves / San Diego / Los Angeles Clippers	15	1977–1991	
Minnesota Timberwolves	13	2005–2017	
Golden State Warriors	12	1995–2006	
Dallas Mavericks	10	1991–2000	
Phoenix Suns	10	2011–2020	
Charlotte Hornets ^	10	2017–present	
New Orleans / Utah Jazz	9	1975–1983	
Golden State Warriors	9	1978–1986	
Sacramento Kings	9	1987–1995	
Washington Bullets	8	1989–1996	
Denver Nuggets	8	1996–2003	
Vancouver / Memphis Grizzlies	8	1996–2003	
Los Angeles Clippers	8	1998–2005	
Atlanta Hawks	8	2000–2007	

=== Longest Conference finals droughts ===
Appearance droughts updated through May 26, 2026. The current Conference Finals format was introduced in 1971.

^	Denotes active drought
†	Year the team joined the NBA

Seasons	Team	NBA Conference Finals appearance droughts	Reference
50	Los Angeles Clippers^{[a]}	1971^{†}–2020	
47	Washington Wizards^^{[b]}	1980–present	
44	Atlanta Hawks	1971–2014	
38	Golden State Warriors	1977–2014	
36	Charlotte Hornets^^{[c]}	1989^{†}–present	
25	New Jersey Nets^{[d]}	1977^{†}–2001	
24	New York Knicks	2001–2024	
25	Philadelphia 76ers^	2002–present	
23	Denver Nuggets	1986–2008	
24	Sacramento Kings	2003–present	
24	New Orleans Pelicans^	2003^{†}–present	
23	Brooklyn Nets^	2004–present	
20	Toronto Raptors	1996^{†}–2015	
20	Sacramento Kings^{[e]}	1982–2001	

- ^{a} Streak includes seasons as Buffalo Braves and San Diego Clippers.
- ^{b} Team last qualified for the Conference Finals as Washington Bullets.
- ^{c} Franchise inactive for two seasons between 2002 and 2004.
- ^{d} Current Brooklyn Nets; includes one season as New York Nets.
- ^{e} Includes four seasons as Kansas City Kings.

=== NBA Division Championship droughts ===
Updated through the 2025–26 season.

^	Longest drought in team history
♦	2025–26 Division Champion

Left click once on Seasons since win column heading then once on Division column heading
to show teams listed in order of division championships.

Franchise	Most recent title	Division	Seasons since win
Charlotte Hornets ^	None (enfranchised 1988–89)	Southeast	36
Minnesota Timberwolves ^	2003–04	Northwest	22
Brooklyn Nets	2005–06	Atlantic	20
New Orleans Pelicans ^	2007–08	Southwest	18
Chicago Bulls	2011–12	Central	14
New York Knicks	2012–13	Atlantic	13
Indiana Pacers	2013–14	Central	12
Washington Wizards	2016–17	Southeast	9
Portland Trail Blazers	2017–18	Northwest	8
Golden State Warriors	2018–19	Pacific	7
Toronto Raptors	2019–20	Atlantic	6
Philadelphia 76ers	2020–21	Atlantic	5
Phoenix Suns	2021–22	Pacific	4
Utah Jazz	2021–22	Northwest	4
Sacramento Kings	2022–23	Pacific	3
Memphis Grizzlies	2022–23	Southwest	3
Miami Heat	2022–23	Southeast	3
Denver Nuggets	2022–23	Northwest	3
Milwaukee Bucks	2023–24	Central	2
Dallas Mavericks	2023–24	Southwest	2
Los Angeles Clippers	2023–24	Pacific	2
Cleveland Cavaliers	2024–25	Central	1
Orlando Magic	2024–25	Southeast	1
Houston Rockets	2024–25	Southwest	1
Boston Celtics ♦	2025–26	Atlantic	0
Detroit Pistons ♦	2025–26	Central	0
Atlanta Hawks ♦	2025–26	Southeast	0
Oklahoma City Thunder ♦	2025–26	Northwest	0
Los Angeles Lakers ♦	2025–26	Pacific	0
San Antonio Spurs ♦	2025–26	Southwest	0

== Finals droughts ==
=== NBA Finals in which neither team had previously won a championship ===
In these instances, the matchup ensured that one team would win the first NBA championship in its history.

*	Both Teams in 1st NBA Finals appearance

Season	Won	Lost	Number of years until loser's drought ended
2006*	Miami Heat	Dallas Mavericks	5
1978	Washington Bullets	Seattle SuperSonics (OKC)	1
1971*	Milwaukee Bucks	Baltimore Bullets (WAS)	7
1957*	Boston Celtics	St. Louis Hawks (ATL)	1
1955	Syracuse Nationals (PHI)	Fort Wayne Pistons (DET)^	34
1951*	Rochester Royals (SAC)^	New York Knicks	19
1949*	Minneapolis Lakers (LAL)^	Washington Capitols†	folded 2 years later
1947*	Philadelphia Warriors (GSW)	Chicago Stags†	folded 3 years later

- ^- Team had previously appeared in the National Basketball League finals before said league was merged for the NBA's formation.
- †- Defunct franchise.
- Abbreviation in parentheses – Current location of NBA franchise.

=== NBA Finals in which neither franchise had won a championship in 20-plus seasons ===
Teams that had never won the NBA championship are included, even if they were less than 20 seasons old at the time.

The 2025 NBA Finals featured the Indiana Pacers and Oklahoma City Thunder; the last championship won by either team was in 1979.

Season	Won	Drought (seasons)	Lost	Drought (seasons)
2025	Oklahoma City Thunder	45	Indiana Pacers	48*
2021	Milwaukee Bucks	49	Phoenix Suns	52*
2015	Golden State Warriors	39	Cleveland Cavaliers	44*
2006	Miami Heat	17*	Dallas Mavericks	25*
1999	San Antonio Spurs	22*	New York Knicks	25
1994	Houston Rockets	26*	New York Knicks	20
1978	Washington Bullets	16*	Seattle SuperSonics	10*
1971	Milwaukee Bucks	2*	Baltimore Bullets	9*
1957	Boston Celtics	10*	St. Louis Hawks	7*
1955	Syracuse Nationals	5*	Fort Wayne Pistons	6*
1951	Rochester Royals	2*	New York Knicks	4*
1949*	Minneapolis Lakers	0*	Washington Capitols†	2*
1947	Philadelphia Warriors	0*	Chicago Stags†	0*

Numbers marked with * indicates that the number is counted from either the franchise's first year in the NBA or the first year of the league (1946, then known as the BAA).

- †- Defunct franchise.

== Teams awaiting their first NBA championship ==
This list includes teams within the current NBA that have never won an NBA championship—sorted by the number of seasons played in the NBA.

Last team to leave list – Denver Nuggets 2023
Total seasons (NBA)	Franchise	Last NBA Finals appearance
58 seasons	Phoenix Suns (1969–present)	2021
56 seasons	Los Angeles Clippers§ (1971–present)	—
52 seasons	Utah Jazz§ (1975–present)	1998
50 seasons	Indiana Pacers‡ (1977–present)	2025
50 seasons	Brooklyn Nets§‡ (1977–present)	2003
37 seasons	Minnesota Timberwolves (1990–present)	—
37 seasons	Orlando Magic (1990–present)	2009
36 seasons	Charlotte Hornets† (1989–2002; 2005–present)	—
31 seasons	Memphis Grizzlies§ (1996–present)	—
24 seasons	New Orleans Pelicans† (2003–present)	—

Notes

- § NBA teams that have relocated from their original city(s).
- † NBA teams that have re-branded to/from their original concept.
- ‡ NBA teams that have won an ABA championship.

=== Cities awaiting first NBA championship ===
Listed according to seasons waited. Current NBA cities/regions only.

Last city to leave list: Oklahoma City, 2025
City	Seasons waited	Conference Title(s)	NBA Team(s)
Phoenix	58	1976, 1993, 2021	Phoenix Suns (1969–present)
Atlanta	58	None	Atlanta Hawks (1969–present)
Indianapolis	50	2000, 2025	Indiana Pacers (1977–present)
Salt Lake City	47	1997, 1998	Utah Jazz (1980–present)
Sacramento	41	None	Sacramento Kings (1986–present)
Orlando	37	1995, 2009	Orlando Magic (1990–present)
Charlotte	36	None	Charlotte Hornets (1989–2002; 2015–present); Charlotte Bobcats (2005–2014)
New Orleans	29	None	New Orleans Jazz (1974–1979); New Orleans Hornets (2003–2013); New Orleans Pelicans (2014–present)
Memphis	25	None	Memphis Grizzlies (2002–present)

=== NBA Championship droughts by division ===
Division	Last NBA Championship	Seasons
Southeast Division	2013 — Heat	13
Southwest Division	2014 — Spurs	12
Central Division	2021 — Bucks	5
Pacific Division	2022 — Warriors	4
Northwest Division	2025 — Thunder	1
Atlantic Division	2026 — Knicks	0

== See also ==
- List of NBA franchise post-season streaks
- List of NBA longest losing streaks
- List of NBA longest winning streaks
- List of MLB franchise post-season droughts
- List of NFL franchise post-season droughts
- List of NHL franchise post-season droughts
- List of MLS club post-season droughts
