= List of Minnesota Timberwolves seasons =

This article is a list of seasons completed by the Minnesota Timberwolves of the National Basketball Association. The Timberwolves joined the NBA as an expansion team for the 1989–90 NBA season, along with the Orlando Magic.

== Table key ==
ASG MVP	All-Star Game Most Valuable Player
COY	Coach of the Year
DPOY	Defensive Player of the Year
Finish	Final position in league or division standings
GB	Games behind first-place team in division
L	Number of regular season losses
EOY	Executive of the Year
FMVP	Finals Most Valuable Player
JWKC	J. Walter Kennedy Citizenship
MIP	Most Improved Player Award
MVP	Most Valuable Player
ROY	Rookie of the Year
SIX	Sixth Man of the Year
SPOR	Sportsmanship Award
W	Number of regular season wins

== Seasons ==
NBA Champions	Conference champions	Division champions	Playoff berth	Play-in berth

Season	League	Conference	Finish	Division	Finish	Wins	Losses	Win%	GB	Playoffs	Awards	Head coach
1989–90	NBA	Western	13th	Midwest	6th	22	60	.268	34			Bill Musselman
1990–91	NBA	Western	11th	Midwest	5th	29	53	.354	26			Bill Musselman
1991–92	NBA	Western	13th	Midwest	6th	15	67	.183	40			Jimmy Rodgers
1992–93	NBA	Western	12th	Midwest	5th	19	63	.232	36			Jimmy Rodgers; Sidney Lowe
1993–94	NBA	Western	12th	Midwest	5th	20	62	.244	38			Sidney Lowe
1994–95	NBA	Western	12th	Midwest	6th	21	61	.256	41			Bill Blair
1995–96	NBA	Western	13th	Midwest	6th	26	56	.317	33			Bill Blair; Flip Saunders
1996–97	NBA	Western	6th	Midwest	3rd	40	42	.488	24	Lost First round (Rockets) 3–0		Flip Saunders
1997–98	NBA	Western	7th	Midwest	3rd	45	37	.549	17	Lost First round (SuperSonics) 3–2		Flip Saunders
1998–99	NBA	Western	8th	Midwest	4th	25	25	.500	12	Lost First round (Spurs) 3–1		Flip Saunders
1999–00	NBA	Western	6th	Midwest	3rd	50	32	.610	5	Lost First round (Trail Blazers) 3–1		Flip Saunders
2000–01	NBA	Western	8th	Midwest	4th	47	35	.573	11	Lost First round (Spurs) 3–1		Flip Saunders
2001–02	NBA	Western	5th	Midwest	3rd	50	32	.610	8	Lost First round (Mavericks) 3–0		Flip Saunders
2002–03	NBA	Western	4th	Midwest	3rd	51	31	.622	9	Lost First round (Lakers) 4–2	Kevin Garnett (ASG MVP)	Flip Saunders
2003–04	NBA	Western	1st	Midwest	1st	58	24	.707	—	Won First round (Nuggets) 4–1; Won conference semifinals (Kings) 4–3; Lost conference finals (Lakers) 4–2	Kevin Garnett (MVP)	Flip Saunders
2004–05	NBA	Western	9th	Northwest	3rd	44	38	.537	8			Flip Saunders; Kevin McHale
2005–06	NBA	Western	14th	Northwest	4th	33	49	.402	11		Kevin Garnett (JWKC)	Dwane Casey
2006–07	NBA	Western	13th	Northwest	4th	32	50	.390	19			Dwane Casey; Randy Wittman
2007–08	NBA	Western	13th	Northwest	4th	22	60	.268	32			Randy Wittman
2008–09	NBA	Western	12th	Northwest	4th	24	58	.293	30			Randy Wittman; Kevin McHale
2009–10	NBA	Western	15th	Northwest	5th	15	67	.183	38			Kurt Rambis
2010–11	NBA	Western	15th	Northwest	5th	17	65	.207	38		Kevin Love (MIP)	Kurt Rambis
2011–12	NBA	Western	12th	Northwest	5th	26	40	.394	21			Rick Adelman
2012–13	NBA	Western	12th	Northwest	5th	31	51	.378	29			Rick Adelman
2013–14	NBA	Western	10th	Northwest	3rd	40	42	.488	19			Rick Adelman
2014–15	NBA	Western	15th	Northwest	5th	16	66	.195	35		Andrew Wiggins (ROY)	Flip Saunders
2015–16	NBA	Western	13th	Northwest	5th	29	53	.354	26		Karl-Anthony Towns (ROY)	Sam Mitchell
2016–17	NBA	Western	13th	Northwest	5th	31	51	.378	20			Tom Thibodeau
2017–18	NBA	Western	8th	Northwest	4th	47	35	.573	18	Lost First round (Rockets) 4–1		Tom Thibodeau
2018–19	NBA	Western	11th	Northwest	5th	36	46	.439	18			Tom Thibodeau; Ryan Saunders
2019–20	NBA	Western	14th	Northwest	5th	19	45	.297	22.5			Ryan Saunders
2020–21	NBA	Western	13th	Northwest	4th	23	49	.319	29			Ryan Saunders; Chris Finch
2021–22	NBA	Western	7th	Northwest	3rd	46	36	.561	18	Lost First round (Grizzlies) 4–2		Chris Finch
2022–23	NBA	Western	8th	Northwest	2nd	42	40	.512	11	Lost First round (Nuggets) 4–1	Mike Conley (SPOR)	Chris Finch
2023–24	NBA	Western	3rd	Northwest	3rd	56	26	.683	1	Won First round (Suns) 4–0; Won conference semifinals (Nuggets) 4–3; Lost conference finals (Mavericks) 4–1	Rudy Gobert (DPOY); Naz Reid (SIX)	Chris Finch
2024–25	NBA	Western	6th	Northwest	3rd	49	33	.598	19	Won First round (Lakers) 4–1; Won conference semifinals (Warriors) 4–1; Lost conference finals (Thunder) 4–1		Chris Finch
2025–26	NBA	Western	6th	Northwest	3rd	49	33	.598	15	Won First round (Nuggets) 4–2; Lost conference semifinals (Spurs) 4–2	Anthony Edwards (ASG MVP)	Chris Finch
Regular season Record						1,245	1,713	.421	1989–present			
Playoff Record						45	61	.425	Playoff Series Record: 7–14			
Combined Record						1,290	1,774	.421				

== Notes ==
- Due to a lockout, the 1998–99 season did not start until February 5, 1999, and all 29 teams played a shortened regular season schedule of 50 games.
- Due to a lockout, the 2011–12 season did not start until December 25, 2011, and all 30 teams played a shortened regular season schedule of 66 games.
- Due to the COVID-19 pandemic, the 2019–20 season was suspended on March 11, 2020, and the regular season was shortened to 64 games for the Timberwolves.
- Due to the COVID-19 pandemic, the 2020–21 season did not start until December 22, 2020, and all 30 teams played a shortened regular season schedule of 72 games.
