= List of Charlotte Hornets seasons =

The Charlotte Hornets are a professional basketball club based in Charlotte, North Carolina. They are members of the National Basketball Association (NBA), playing in the Southeast Division of the Eastern Conference. The original Charlotte Hornets franchise played in Charlotte from 1988 to 2002, before relocating to New Orleans, Louisiana and becoming the New Orleans Hornets. A new franchise, the Charlotte Bobcats, began play in the 2004–05 season. In 2014, the Bobcats adopted the Hornets name and acquired the history and records of the original Charlotte Hornets.

== Seasons ==
Key
Finish	Final position in league or division standings
MVP	Most Valuable Player
ASG MVP	All-Star Game Most Valuable Player
FMVP	NBA Finals Most Valuable Player
COY	Coach of the Year
DPOY	Defensive Player of the Year
SIX	Sixth Man of the Year
ROY	Rookie of the Year
MIP	Most Improved Player
SPOR	Sportsmanship Award

NBA champions	Conference champions	Division champions	Playoff berth	Play-in berth

Season	Team	League	Conference	Finish (Note: The Finish column lists regular season results and excludes postseason play.)	Division	Finish	W (Note: The Wins and Losses columns list regular season results and exclude any postseason play. Regular and postseason records are combined only below the table.)	L	Win%	GB (Note: The formula is as follows: $\mathrm{Games}\ \mathrm{behind} = \frac{(\mathrm{Team A's}\ \mathrm{wins}-\mathrm{Team B's}\ \mathrm{wins}) + (\mathrm{Team B's}\ \mathrm{losses} - \mathrm{Team A's}\ \mathrm{losses})}{\mathrm{2}}$)	Playoffs	Awards	Head coach
Charlotte Hornets
1988–89	1988–89	NBA	Eastern	12th	Atlantic	6th	20	62	.244	43	—	—	Dick Harter
1989–90	1989–90	NBA	Western	14th	Midwest	7th	19	63	.232	44	—	—	Dick Harter; Gene Littles
1990–91	1990–91	NBA	Eastern	12th	Central	7th	26	56	.317	35	—	—	Gene Littles
1991–92	1991–92	NBA	Eastern	12th	Central	7th	31	51	.378	36	—	Larry Johnson (ROY)	Allan Bristow
1992–93	1992–93	NBA	Eastern	5th	Central	3rd	44	38	.537	16	Won first round (Celtics) 3–1; Lost conference semifinals (Knicks) 4–1	—	Allan Bristow
1993–94	1993–94	NBA	Eastern	9th	Central	5th	41	41	.500	16	—	Dell Curry (SIX)	Allan Bristow
1994–95	1994–95	NBA	Eastern	4th	Central	2nd	50	32	.610	7	Lost first round (Bulls) 3–1	—	Allan Bristow
1995–96	1995–96	NBA	Eastern	9th	Central	6th	41	41	.500	31	—	—	Allan Bristow
1996–97	1996–97	NBA	Eastern	6th	Central	4th	54	28	.659	15	Lost first round (Knicks) 3–0	Bob Bass (EOY); Glen Rice (ASG MVP)	Dave Cowens
1997–98	1997–98	NBA	Eastern	4th	Central	3rd	51	31	.622	11	Won first round (Hawks) 3–1; Lost conference semifinals (Bulls) 4–1	—	Dave Cowens
1998–99 (Note: Due to a lockout, the season did not start until February 5, 1999, and all 29 teams played a shortened regular season schedule of 50 games.)	1998–99	NBA	Eastern	9th	Central	5th	26	24	.520	7	—	—	Dave Cowens; Paul Silas
1999–00	1999–00	NBA	Eastern	4th	Central	2nd	49	33	.598	7	Lost first round (76ers) 3–1	—	Paul Silas
2000–01	2000–01	NBA	Eastern	6th	Central	3rd	46	36	.561	10	Won first round (Heat) 3–0; Lost conference semifinals (Bucks) 4–3	—	Paul Silas
2001–02	2001–02	NBA	Eastern	4th	Central	2nd	44	38	.537	8	Won first round (Magic) 3–1; Lost conference semifinals (Nets) 4–1	—	Paul Silas
2002–03 (Note: Prior to the season, the Charlotte Hornets relocated to New Orleans and became the New Orleans Hornets.)	Inactive												
2003–04	Inactive												
Charlotte Bobcats
2004–05 (Note: The Charlotte Bobcats began play as a new expansion team (considered the league's 30th franchise at the time).)	2004–05	NBA	Eastern	14th	Southeast	4th	18	64	.220	41	—	Emeka Okafor (ROY)	Bernie Bickerstaff
2005–06	2005–06	NBA	Eastern	13th	Southeast	4th	26	56	.317	38	—	—	Bernie Bickerstaff
2006–07	2006–07	NBA	Eastern	12th	Southeast	4th	33	49	.402	20	—	—	Bernie Bickerstaff
2007–08	2007–08	NBA	Eastern	12th	Southeast	4th	32	50	.390	34	—	—	Sam Vincent
2008–09	2008–09	NBA	Eastern	10th	Southeast	4th	35	47	.427	31	—	—	Larry Brown
2009–10	2009–10	NBA	Eastern	7th	Southeast	4th	44	38	.537	17	Lost first round (Magic) 4–0	—	Larry Brown
2010–11	2010–11	NBA	Eastern	10th	Southeast	4th	34	48	.415	28	—	—	Larry Brown; Paul Silas
2011–12 (Note: Due to a lockout, the season did not start until December 25, 2011, and all 30 teams played a shortened regular season schedule of 66 games.)	2011–12	NBA	Eastern	15th	Southeast	5th	7	59	.106	43	—	—	Paul Silas
2012–13	2012–13	NBA	Eastern	14th	Southeast	4th	21	61	.256	45	—	—	Mike Dunlap
2013–14	2013–14	NBA	Eastern	7th	Southeast	3rd	43	39	.524	13	Lost first round (Heat) 4–0	—	Steve Clifford
Charlotte Hornets
2014–15 (Note: Prior to the season, the Charlotte Bobcats were renamed Charlotte Hornets, and acquired the history and records of the original Charlotte Hornets (1988–2002) from the New Orleans Pelicans.)	2014–15	NBA	Eastern	11th	Southeast	4th	33	49	.402	27	—	—	Steve Clifford
2015–16	2015–16	NBA	Eastern	6th	Southeast	3rd	48	34	.585	9	Lost first round (Heat) 4–3	—	Steve Clifford
2016–17	2016–17	NBA	Eastern	11th	Southeast	4th	36	46	.439	17	—	Kemba Walker (SPOR)	Steve Clifford
2017–18	2017–18	NBA	Eastern	10th	Southeast	3rd	36	46	.439	23	—	Kemba Walker (SPOR)	Steve Clifford
2018–19	2018–19	NBA	Eastern	9th	Southeast	2nd	39	43	.476	21	—	—	James Borrego
2019–20 (Note: Due to the COVID-19 pandemic, the season was suspended on March 11, 2020, ending the Hornets' season after 65 games.)	2019–20	NBA	Eastern	9th	Southeast	3rd	23	42	.354	29	—	—	James Borrego
2020–21 (Note: Due to the COVID-19 pandemic, the season did not start until December 22, 2020, and all 30 teams played a shortened regular season schedule of 72 games.)	2020–21	NBA	Eastern	10th	Southeast	4th	33	39	.458	16	—	LaMelo Ball (ROY)	James Borrego
2021–22	2021–22	NBA	Eastern	10th	Southeast	3rd	43	39	.524	10	—	—	James Borrego
2022–23	2022–23	NBA	Eastern	14th	Southeast	5th	27	55	.329	31	—	—	Steve Clifford
2023–24	2023–24	NBA	Eastern	13th	Southeast	4th	21	61	.256	43	—	—	Steve Clifford
2024–25	2024–25	NBA	Eastern	14th	Southeast	4th	19	63	.232	45	—	—	Charles Lee
2025–26	2025–26	NBA	Eastern	9th	Southeast	3rd	44	38	.537	16	—	—	Charles Lee

== All-time records ==
Statistics are correct as of the conclusion of the 2025–26 NBA season.

Statistic	Wins	Losses	W–L%
All-time regular season record	1,237	1,640	.430
All-time postseason record	23	40	.365
All-time regular and postseason record	1,260	1,680	.429
