= List of New Orleans Pelicans seasons =

The New Orleans Pelicans are a professional basketball team based in New Orleans. They are members of the Southwest Division of the Western Conference in the National Basketball Association (NBA). The franchise began play during the 2002–03 NBA season as the New Orleans Hornets following the relocation of the Charlotte Hornets, based in Charlotte, North Carolina. After three seasons in New Orleans, Hurricane Katrina forced the franchise to temporarily relocate to Oklahoma City, where they spent two seasons as the New Orleans/Oklahoma City Hornets. The Hornets returned to New Orleans full-time for the 2007–08 season. The team changed its name to the New Orleans Pelicans at the conclusion of the 2012–13 season.

Led by All-Star Baron Davis, the New Orleans Hornets qualified for their first postseason appearance during the 2002–03 season. They lost to the Philadelphia 76ers in the first round. The team earned its first division title during the 2007–08 season, behind the play of All-Stars Chris Paul and David West. Finishing with a franchise-best record of 56 wins and 26 losses, the Hornets won the Southwest Division title over the defending champion San Antonio Spurs. They advanced to the conference semifinals, where they were defeated by the Spurs in seven games.

In 24 seasons, the Pelicans have compiled an overall record of 878-1054 all-time. They have qualified the playoffs nine times, winning two series, and posted nine seasons of 41 wins or more.

== Seasons ==
League champions	Conference champions	Division champions	Playoff berth	Play-in berth

Season	Team	League	Conference	Finish	Division	Finish	Wins	Losses	Win%	GB	Playoffs	Awards	Head Coach
New Orleans Hornets
2002–03	2002–03	NBA	Eastern	5th	Central	3rd	47	35	.573	3	Lost first round (76ers) 4–2		Paul Silas
2003–04	2003–04	NBA	Eastern	5th	Central	3rd	41	41	.500	20	Lost first round (Heat) 4–3	P.J. Brown (SPOR)	Tim Floyd
2004–05	2004–05	NBA	Western	15th	Southwest	5th	18	64	.220	41			Byron Scott
2005–06	2005–06^{[A]}	NBA	Western	10th	Southwest	4th	38	44	.463	25		Chris Paul (ROY)	Byron Scott
2006–07	2006–07^{[A]}	NBA	Western	10th	Southwest	4th	39	43	.476	28			Byron Scott
2007–08	2007–08	NBA	Western	2nd	Southwest	1st	56	26	.683	–	Won first round (Mavericks) 4–1; Lost conference semifinals (Spurs) 4–3	Byron Scott (COY)	Byron Scott
2008–09	2008–09	NBA	Western	7th	Southwest	4th	49	33	.598	5	Lost first round (Nuggets) 4–1		Byron Scott
2009–10	2009–10	NBA	Western	11th	Southwest	5th	37	45	.451	18			Byron Scott; Jeff Bower
2010–11	2010–11	NBA	Western	7th	Southwest	3rd	46	36	.561	15	Lost first round (Lakers) 4–2		Monty Williams
2011–12	2011–12^{[B]}	NBA	Western	15th	Southwest	5th	21	45	.318	29			Monty Williams
2012–13	2012–13	NBA	Western	14th	Southwest	5th	27	55	.329	31			Monty Williams
New Orleans Pelicans
2013–14	2013–14	NBA	Western	12th	Southwest	5th	34	48	.415	28			Monty Williams
2014–15	2014–15	NBA	Western	8th	Southwest	5th	45	37	.549	11	Lost first round (Warriors) 4–0		Monty Williams
2015–16	2015–16	NBA	Western	12th	Southwest	5th	30	52	.366	37			Alvin Gentry
2016–17	2016–17	NBA	Western	10th	Southwest	4th	34	48	.415	27		Anthony Davis (ASG MVP)	Alvin Gentry
2017–18	2017–18	NBA	Western	6th	Southwest	2nd	48	34	.585	17	Won first round (Trail Blazers) 4–0; Lost conference semifinals (Warriors) 4–1		Alvin Gentry
2018–19	2018–19	NBA	Western	13th	Southwest	4th	33	49	.402	20			Alvin Gentry
2019–20	2019–20	NBA	Western	13th	Southwest	5th	30	42	.417	14		Brandon Ingram (MIP)	Alvin Gentry
2020–21	2020–21	NBA	Western	11th	Southwest	4th	31	41	.431	11			Stan Van Gundy
2021–22	2021–22	NBA	Western	9th^{[C]}	Southwest	3rd	36	46	.439	20	Lost first round (Suns) 4–2		Willie Green
2022–23	2022–23	NBA	Western	9th	Southwest	2nd	42	40	.512	11			Willie Green
2023–24	2023–24	NBA	Western	7th^{[D]}	Southwest	2nd	49	33	.598	1	Lost first round (Thunder) 4–0	CJ McCollum (JWKC)	Willie Green
2024–25	2024–25	NBA	Western	14th	Southwest	5th	21	61	.256	31			Willie Green
2025–26	2025–26	NBA	Western	11th	Southwest	3rd	26	56	.317	36			Willie Green; James Borrego

== All-time records ==
Statistics are correct as of the conclusion of the 2025–26 NBA season.

Statistic	Wins	Losses	W–L%
All-time regular season record	878	1,054	.454
All-time postseason record	22	37	.373
All-time regular and postseason record	900	1,091	.452

== Notes ==
- ^{A} Due to the catastrophic devastation brought by Hurricane Katrina upon the communities of southeastern Louisiana, the Hornets franchise temporarily relocated their base of operations to Oklahoma City in 2005–06 and 2006–07. During this time, the franchise was known as the New Orleans/Oklahoma City Hornets.
- ^{B} Due to a lockout, the 2011–12 season did not start until December 25, 2011, and all 30 teams played a shortened 66-game regular season schedule.
- ^{C} Earned 8th seed after beating the Los Angeles Clippers in the NBA play-in tournament.
- ^{D} Fell to the 8th seed after losing to the Los Angeles Lakers in the NBA play-in tournament.
