= List of Orlando Magic seasons =

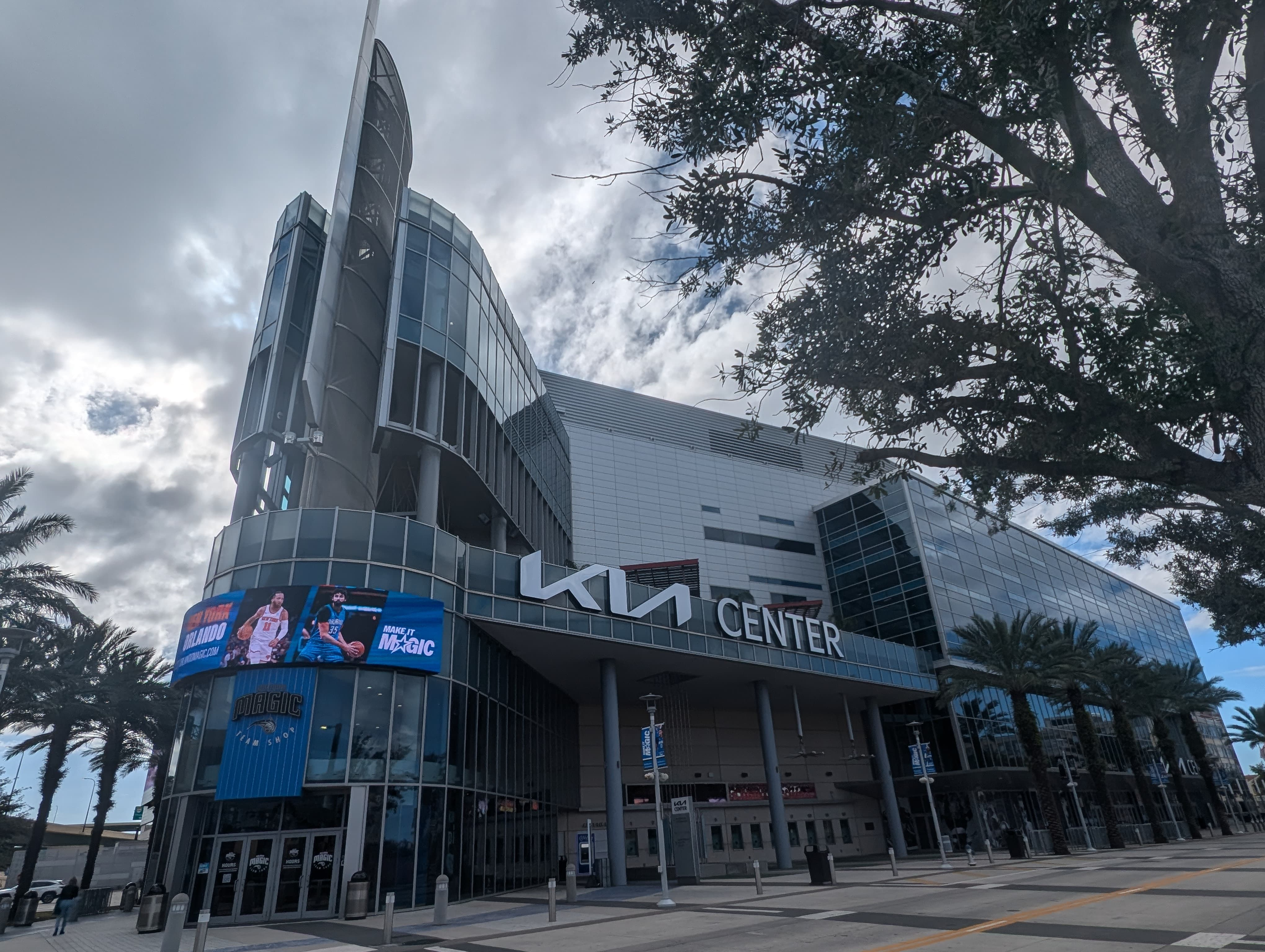
Kia Center has been home to the Magic since 2010

This is a list of seasons completed by the Orlando Magic. The Orlando Magic are an American professional basketball team based in Orlando, Florida. They play in the Southeast Division of the Eastern Conference of the National Basketball Association (NBA). The team was established in 1989. The Magic have not won an NBA title, but they have won 8 division titles and appeared in the NBA Finals twice, in 1995 and 2009. The best record posted by the Magic was 60–22, in the 1995–96 season, and their worst record was 18–64, in the team's inaugural season. In their 36 seasons of existence, the Magic have made the playoffs 18 times.

== Table key ==
AMVP	All-Star Game Most Valuable Player
COY	Coach of the Year
DPOY	Defensive Player of the Year
Finish	Final position in league or division standings
GB	Games behind first-place team in division
L	Number of regular season losses
EOY	Executive of the Year
FMVP	Finals Most Valuable Player
JWKC	J. Walter Kennedy Citizenship
MVP	Most Valuable Player
ROY	Rookie of the Year
SIX	Sixth Man of the Year
MIP	Most Improved Player Award
SPOR	Sportsmanship Award
W	Number of regular season wins

== Seasons ==
NBA champions	Conference champions	Division champions	Playoff berth	Play-in berth

Season	Team	Conference	Finish	Division	Finish	Wins	Losses	Win%	GB	Playoffs	Awards	Head coach
1989–90	1989–90	Eastern	12th	Central	7th	18	64	.220	41			Matt Guokas
1990–91	1990–91	Western	9th	Midwest	4th	31	51	.378	24		Scott Skiles (MIP)	Matt Guokas
1991–92	1991–92	Eastern	14th	Atlantic	7th	21	61	.256	30			Matt Guokas
1992–93	1992–93	Eastern	9th	Atlantic	4th	41	41	.500	19		Shaquille O'Neal (ROY)	Matt Guokas
1993–94	1993–94	Eastern	4th	Atlantic	2nd	50	32	.610	7	Lost First round (Pacers) 3–0		Brian Hill
1994–95	1994–95	Eastern	1st	Atlantic	1st	57	25	.695	—	Won First round (Celtics) 3–1; Won Conference semifinals (Bulls) 4–2; Won Conference finals (Pacers) 4–3; Lost NBA Finals (Rockets) 4–0		Brian Hill
1995–96	1995–96	Eastern	2nd	Atlantic	1st	60	22	.732	—	Won First round (Pistons) 3–0; Won Conference semifinals (Hawks) 4–1; Lost Conference finals (Bulls) 4–0		Brian Hill
1996–97	1996–97	Eastern	7th	Atlantic	3rd	45	37	.549	16	Lost First round (Heat) 3–2		Brian Hill; Richie Adubato
1997–98	1997–98	Eastern	10th	Atlantic	5th	41	41	.500	14			Chuck Daly
1998–99	1998–99	Eastern	3rd	Atlantic	2nd	33	17	.660	—	Lost First round (76ers) 3–1	Darrell Armstrong (SIX, MIP)	Chuck Daly
1999–00	1999–00	Eastern	9th	Atlantic	4th	41	41	.500	11		Doc Rivers (COY); John Gabriel (EOY)	Doc Rivers
2000–01	2000–01	Eastern	7th	Atlantic	4th	43	39	.524	13	Lost First round (Bucks) 3–1	Mike Miller (ROY); Tracy McGrady (MIP)	Doc Rivers
2001–02	2001–02	Eastern	5th	Atlantic	3rd	44	38	.537	8	Lost First round (Hornets) 3–1		Doc Rivers
2002–03	2002–03	Eastern	8th	Atlantic	4th	42	40	.512	7	Lost First round (Pistons) 4–3		Doc Rivers
2003–04	2003–04	Eastern	15th	Atlantic	7th	21	61	.256	26			Doc Rivers; Johnny Davis
2004–05	2004–05	Eastern	10th	Southeast	3rd	36	46	.439	23		Grant Hill (SPOR)	Johnny Davis; Chris Jent
2005–06	2005–06	Eastern	10th	Southeast	3rd	36	46	.439	16			Brian Hill
2006–07	2006–07	Eastern	8th	Southeast	3rd	40	42	.488	4	Lost First round (Pistons) 4–0		Brian Hill
2007–08	2007–08	Eastern	3rd	Southeast	1st	52	30	.634	—	Won First round (Raptors) 4–1; Lost Conference semifinals (Pistons) 4–1	Hedo Türkoğlu (MIP)	Stan Van Gundy
2008–09	2008–09	Eastern	3rd	Southeast	1st	59	23	.720	—	Won First round (76ers) 4–2; Won Conference semifinals (Celtics) 4–3; Won Conference finals (Cavaliers) 4–2; Lost NBA Finals (Lakers) 4–1	Dwight Howard (DPOY)	Stan Van Gundy
2009–10	2009–10	Eastern	2nd	Southeast	1st	59	23	.720	—	Won First round (Bobcats) 4–0; Won Conference semifinals (Hawks) 4–0; Lost Conference finals (Celtics) 4–2	Dwight Howard (DPOY)	Stan Van Gundy
2010–11	2010–11	Eastern	4th	Southeast	2nd	52	30	.634	6	Lost First round (Hawks) 4–2	Dwight Howard (DPOY)	Stan Van Gundy
2011–12	2011–12	Eastern	6th	Southeast	3rd	37	29	.561	9	Lost First round (Pacers) 4–1	Ryan Anderson (MIP)	Stan Van Gundy
2012–13	2012–13	Eastern	15th	Southeast	5th	20	62	.244	46			Jacque Vaughn
2013–14	2013–14	Eastern	13th	Southeast	5th	23	59	.280	31			Jacque Vaughn
2014–15	2014–15	Eastern	13th	Southeast	5th	25	57	.305	35			Jacque Vaughn; James Borrego
2015–16	2015–16	Eastern	11th	Southeast	5th	35	47	.427	13			Scott Skiles
2016–17	2016–17	Eastern	13th	Southeast	5th	29	53	.354	20			Frank Vogel
2017–18	2017–18	Eastern	14th	Southeast	4th	25	57	.305	19			Frank Vogel
2018–19	2018–19	Eastern	7th	Southeast	1st	42	40	.512	—	Lost First round (Raptors) 4–1		Steve Clifford
2019–20	2019–20	Eastern	8th	Southeast	2nd	33	40	.452	11.5	Lost First round (Bucks) 4–1		Steve Clifford
2020–21	2020–21	Eastern	14th	Southeast	5th	21	51	.292	20			Steve Clifford
2021–22	2021–22	Eastern	15th	Southeast	5th	22	60	.268	31			Jamahl Mosley
2022–23	2022–23	Eastern	13th	Southeast	3rd	34	48	.415	10		Paolo Banchero (ROY)	Jamahl Mosley
2023–24	2023–24	Eastern	5th	Southeast	1st	47	35	.573	—	Lost First round (Cavaliers) 4–3		Jamahl Mosley
2024–25	2024–25	Eastern	7th	Southeast	1st	41	41	.500	—	Lost First round (Celtics) 4–1		Jamahl Mosley
2025–26	2025–26	Eastern	8th	Southeast	2nd	45	37	.549	1	Lost First round (Pistons) 4–3		Jamahl Mosley

== All-time records ==
Note: statistics are correct as of the conclusion of the 2025–26 NBA season

Statistic	Wins	Losses	Win%
All-time regular season record	1,401	1,566	.472
All-time play-in game record	2	1	.667
All-time post-season record	66	86	.434
All-time regular and post-season record	1,469	1,653	.471

== Notes ==
- Due to a lockout, the 1998–99 season did not start until February 5, 1999, and all 29 teams played a shortened regular season schedule of 50 games. The Magic finished tied with the Miami Heat and the Indiana Pacers for the best record in the Eastern Conference; based on tiebreakers, the Heat won the Atlantic Division and earned the top seed, while the Pacers won the Central Division and earned the #2 seed.
- Due to a lockout, the 2011–12 season did not start until December 25, 2011, and all 30 teams played a shortened regular season schedule of 66 games.
- Due to the COVID-19 pandemic, the 2019–20 season was suspended from March 11 to July 30, 2020, and the regular season was shortened to 73 games for the Magic.
- Due to the COVID-19 pandemic, the 2020–21 season did not start until December 22, 2020, and all 30 teams played a shortened regular season schedule of 72 games.
