= List of Memphis Grizzlies seasons =

This is a list of seasons completed by the Memphis Grizzlies of the National Basketball Association (NBA). The team was founded in 1995 as the Vancouver Grizzlies as one of two franchises that joined the NBA for the 1995–96 season. The Grizzlies moved to Memphis after the 2000–01 season.

== Table key ==
| Wins | Number of regular season wins |
| Losses | Number of regular season losses |
| GB | Games behind first-place team in division^{[a]} |
| Finish | Final position in league or division standings |
| ROY | Rookie of the Year |
| SIX | Sixth Man of the Year |
| DPOY | Defensive Player of the Year |
| COY | Coach of the Year |
| EOY | Executive of the Year |
| MIP | Most Improved Player of the Year |
| SPOR | Sportsmanship Award |

== Seasons ==
Note: Statistics are correct as of the 2025–26 season.

| NBA champions | Conference champions | Division champions | Playoff berth | Play-in berth |

| Season | Conference | Conf. Finish | Division | Div. Finish | Wins | Losses | Win% | GB | Playoffs | Awards | Head coach |
|---|---|---|---|---|---|---|---|---|---|---|---|
Vancouver Grizzlies
| 1995–96 | Western | 14th | Midwest | 7th | 15 | 67 | .183 | 44 | — | | Brian Winters |
| 1996–97 | Western | 14th | Midwest | 7th | 14 | 68 | .171 | 50 | — | | Brian Winters; Stu Jackson |
| 1997–98 | Western | 11th | Midwest | 6th | 19 | 63 | .232 | 43 | — | | Brian Hill |
| 1998–99 | Western | 14th | Midwest | 7th | 8 | 42 | .160 | 29 | — | | Brian Hill |
| 1999–00 | Western | 12th | Midwest | 7th | 22 | 60 | .268 | 33 | — | | Brian Hill; Lionel Hollins |
| 2000–01 | Western | 13th | Midwest | 7th | 23 | 59 | .280 | 35 | — | | Sidney Lowe |
Memphis Grizzlies
| 2001–02 | Western | 13th | Midwest | 7th | 23 | 59 | .280 | 35 | — | Pau Gasol (ROY) | Sidney Lowe |
| 2002–03 | Western | 12th | Midwest | 6th | 28 | 54 | .341 | 32 | — | | Sidney Lowe; Hubie Brown |
| 2003–04 | Western | 6th | Midwest | 4th | 50 | 32 | .610 | 8 | Lost First round (Spurs) 4–0 | Hubie Brown (COY); Jerry West (EOY) | Hubie Brown |
| 2004–05 | Western | 8th | Southwest | 4th | 45 | 37 | .549 | 14 | Lost First round (Suns) 4–0 | | Hubie Brown; Lionel Hollins; Mike Fratello |
| 2005–06 | Western | 5th | Southwest | 3rd | 49 | 33 | .598 | 14 | Lost First round (Mavericks) 4–0 | Mike Miller (SIX) | Mike Fratello |
| 2006–07 | Western | 15th | Southwest | 5th | 22 | 60 | .268 | 45 | — | | Mike Fratello; Tony Barone |
| 2007–08 | Western | 14th | Southwest | 5th | 22 | 60 | .268 | 34 | — | | Marc Iavaroni |
| 2008–09 | Western | 12th | Southwest | 5th | 24 | 58 | .293 | 30 | — | | Marc Iavaroni; Johnny Davis; Lionel Hollins |
| 2009–10 | Western | 10th | Southwest | 4th | 40 | 42 | .488 | 15 | — | | Lionel Hollins |
| 2010–11 | Western | 8th | Southwest | 4th | 46 | 36 | .561 | 15 | Won First round (Spurs) 4–2; Lost Conference semifinals (Thunder) 4–3 | | Lionel Hollins |
| 2011–12 | Western | 4th | Southwest | 2nd | 41 | 25 | .621 | 9 | Lost First round (Clippers) 4–3 | | Lionel Hollins |
| 2012–13 | Western | 5th | Southwest | 2nd | 56 | 26 | .683 | 2 | Won First round (Clippers) 4–2; Won Conference semifinals (Thunder) 4–1; Lost Conference finals (Spurs) 4–0 | Marc Gasol (DPOY) | Lionel Hollins |
| 2013–14 | Western | 7th | Southwest | 3rd | 50 | 32 | .610 | 12 | Lost First round (Thunder) 4–3 | Mike Conley (SPOR) | Dave Joerger |
| 2014–15 | Western | 5th | Southwest | 2nd | 55 | 27 | .671 | 1 | Won First round (Trail Blazers) 4–1; Lost Conference semifinals (Warriors) 4–2 | | Dave Joerger |
| 2015–16 | Western | 7th | Southwest | 3rd | 42 | 40 | .512 | 25 | Lost First round (Spurs) 4–0 | Mike Conley (SPOR) | Dave Joerger |
| 2016–17 | Western | 7th | Southwest | 3rd | 43 | 39 | .524 | 18 | Lost First round (Spurs) 4–2 | | David Fizdale |
| 2017–18 | Western | 14th | Southwest | 5th | 22 | 60 | .268 | 43 | — | | David Fizdale; J. B. Bickerstaff |
| 2018–19 | Western | 12th | Southwest | 3rd | 33 | 49 | .402 | 24 | — | Mike Conley (SPOR) | J. B. Bickerstaff |
| 2019–20 | Western | 9th | Southwest | 3rd | 34 | 39 | .466 | 19 | — | Ja Morant (ROY) | Taylor Jenkins |
| 2020–21 | Western | 8th (Note: Earned 8th seed after beating the Golden State Warriors in the NBA play-in tournament.) | Southwest | 2nd | 38 | 34 | .528 | 4 | Lost First round (Jazz) 4–1 | | Taylor Jenkins |
| 2021–22 | Western | 2nd | Southwest | 1st | 56 | 26 | .683 | — | Won First round (Timberwolves) 4–2; Lost Conference semifinals (Warriors) 4–2 | Ja Morant (MIP); Zachary Kleiman (EOY) | Taylor Jenkins |
| 2022–23 | Western | 2nd | Southwest | 1st | 51 | 31 | .622 | — | Lost First round (Lakers) 4–2 | Jaren Jackson Jr. (DPOY) | Taylor Jenkins |
| 2023–24 | Western | 13th | Southwest | 4th | 27 | 55 | .329 | 23 | — | | Taylor Jenkins |
| 2024–25 | Western | 8th | Southwest | 2nd | 48 | 34 | .585 | 4 | Lost First round (Thunder) 4–0 | | Taylor Jenkins; Tuomas Iisalo |
| 2025–26 | Western | 13th | Southwest | 5th | 25 | 57 | .305 | 37 | — | | Tuomas Iisalo |

=== All-time records ===
| Statistic | Wins | Losses | Win% |
|---|---|---|---|
| Vancouver Grizzlies regular season record (1995–2001) | 101 | 359 | .220 |
| Memphis Grizzlies regular season record (2001–present) | 970 | 1,045 | .481 |
| All-time regular season record (1995–present) | 1,071 | 1,404 | .433 |
| Vancouver Grizzlies post-season record (1995–2001) | 0 | 0 | – |
| Memphis Grizzlies post-season record (2001–present) (Note: Including NBA play-in tournament games.) | 41 | 66 | .383 |
| All-time post-season record (1995–present) | 41 | 66 | .383 |
| All-time regular and post-season record | 1,112 | 1,470 | .431 |
