= List of Dallas Mavericks seasons =

The Dallas Mavericks are an American professional basketball team based in Dallas, Texas. They are members of the Southwest Division of the Western Conference in the National Basketball Association (NBA). The Mavericks began playing in the NBA as an expansion team in the 1980–81 season. In their inaugural season, they posted a win–loss record of 15–67.

From 1983 to 1990, the Mavericks, led by key players including Mark Aguirre, Brad Davis and Rolando Blackman, made the postseason six out of seven times, appearing in the conference finals in 1988. For the rest of the decade the Mavericks were dreadful: they bottomed out with an 11–71 record and the worst average point differential in NBA history during the 1992–93 season. This was followed by a 13–69 mark in the 1993–94 season – easily the worst two-season record in NBA history – and the Mavericks did not win more than thirty-six games in any season until 1999–2000.

The Mavericks returned to prominence in the 2000s, coinciding with the franchise's purchase by Mark Cuban. Leading by the trio of Dirk Nowitzki, Michael Finley and Steve Nash, they returned to the playoffs in 2001 and to the conference finals in 2003. While Nash and Finley left in 2004 and 2005 respectively, Nowitzki emerged as the team's leader, leading the Mavericks to their first NBA Finals appearance in 2006, only to lose to the Miami Heat. After a series of early exits from the playoffs, the Mavericks returned to the NBA Finals again in 2011, also against the Heat, and won their first NBA Championship. In 2024, they made their third NBA Finals appearance but were defeated by the juggernaut Boston Celtics.

The Mavericks have played 45 seasons, and advanced to the playoffs in 25 of those seasons. They have won five division titles, have been conference champions three times and have won one NBA Championship.

== Table key ==
COY	Coach of the Year
Finish	Final position in league or division standings
GB	Games behind first-place team in division (Note: The formula is as follows: $\mathrm{Games}\ \mathrm{behind} = \frac{(\mathrm{Team A's}\ \mathrm{wins}-\mathrm{Team B's}\ \mathrm{wins}) + (\mathrm{Team B's}\ \mathrm{losses} - \mathrm{Team A's}\ \mathrm{losses})}{\mathrm{2}}$)
Italics	Season in progress
Losses	Number of regular season losses
FMVP	Finals Most Valuable Player
MVP	Most Valuable Player
ROY	Rookie of the Year
SIX	Sixth Man of the Year
SPOR	Sportmanship Award
Wins	Number of regular season wins

== Seasons ==
Note: Statistics are correct as of the end of the 2025–26 season.

NBA Champions	Conference Champions	Division champions	Playoff berth	Play-in berth

Season	League	Conference	Finish	Division	Finish	Wins	Losses	Win%	GB	Playoffs	Awards	Head coach	Ref.
1980–81	NBA	Western	12th	Midwest	6th	15	67	.183	37	—	—	Dick Motta	
1981–82	NBA	Western	10th	Midwest	5th	28	54	.341	20	—	—	Dick Motta	
1982–83	NBA	Western	8th	Midwest	4th	38	44	.463	15	—	—	Dick Motta	
1983–84	NBA	Western	4th	Midwest	2nd	43	39	.524	2	Won First round (SuperSonics) 3–2; Lost conference semifinals (Lakers) 4–1	—	Dick Motta	
1984–85	NBA	Western	4th	Midwest	3rd	44	38	.537	8	Lost First round (Trail Blazers) 3–1	—	Dick Motta	
1985–86	NBA	Western	4th	Midwest	3rd	44	38	.537	7	Won First round (Jazz) 3–1; Lost conference semifinals (Lakers) 4–2	—	Dick Motta	
1986–87	NBA	Western	2nd	Midwest	1st	55	27	.671	—	Lost First round (SuperSonics) 3–1	—	Dick Motta	
1987–88	NBA	Western	3rd	Midwest	2nd	53	29	.646	1	Won First round (Rockets) 3–1; Won conference semifinals (Nuggets) 4–2; Lost conference finals (Lakers) 4–3	Roy Tarpley (SIX)	John MacLeod	
1988–89	NBA	Western	9th	Midwest	4th	38	44	.463	13	—	—	John MacLeod	
1989–90	NBA	Western	6th	Midwest	3rd	47	35	.573	9	Lost First round (Trail Blazers) 3–0	—	John MacLeod; Richie Adubato	
1990–91	NBA	Western	12th	Midwest	6th	28	54	.341	27	—	—	Richie Adubato	
1991–92	NBA	Western	12th	Midwest	5th	22	60	.268	33	—	—	Richie Adubato	
1992–93	NBA	Western	13th	Midwest	6th	11	71	.134	44	—	—	Richie Adubato; Gar Heard	
1993–94	NBA	Western	13th	Midwest	6th	13	69	.159	45	—	—	Quinn Buckner	
1994–95	NBA	Western	10th	Midwest	5th	36	46	.439	26	—	Jason Kidd (ROY) (Note: Kidd shared Rookie of the Year honors with Grant Hill of the Detroit Pistons.)	Dick Motta	
1995–96	NBA	Western	12th	Midwest	5th	26	56	.317	33	—	—	Dick Motta	
1996–97	NBA	Western	11th	Midwest	4th	24	58	.293	40	—	—	Jim Cleamons	
1997–98	NBA	Western	10th	Midwest	5th	20	62	.244	42	—	—	Jim Cleamons; Don Nelson	
1998–99 (Note: Due to a lockout, the season did not start until February 5, 1999, and all 29 teams played a shortened 50 game regular season schedule.)	NBA	Western	11th	Midwest	5th	19	31	.380	18	—	—	Don Nelson	
1999–00	NBA	Western	9th	Midwest	4th	40	42	.488	15	—	—	Don Nelson	
2000–01	NBA	Western	5th	Midwest	3rd	53	29	.646	5	Won First round (Jazz) 3–2; Lost conference semifinals (Spurs) 4–1	—	Don Nelson	
2001–02	NBA	Western	4th	Midwest	2nd	57	25	.695	1	Won First round (Timberwolves) 3–0; Lost conference semifinals (Kings) 4–1	—	Don Nelson	
2002–03	NBA	Western	3rd	Midwest	2nd	60	22	.732	—	Won First round (Trail Blazers) 4–3; Won conference semifinals (Kings) 4–3; Lost conference finals (Spurs) 4–2	—	Don Nelson	
2003–04	NBA	Western	5th	Midwest	3rd	52	30	.634	6	Lost First round (Kings) 4–1	Antawn Jamison (SIX)	Don Nelson	
2004–05	NBA	Western	4th	Southwest	2nd	58	24	.707	1	Won First round (Rockets) 4–3; Lost conference semifinals (Suns) 4–2	—	Don Nelson; Avery Johnson	
2005–06	NBA	Western	4th	Southwest	2nd	60	22	.732	3	Won First round (Grizzlies) 4–0; Won conference semifinals (Spurs) 4–3; Won conference finals (Suns) 4–2; Lost NBA Finals (Heat) 4–2	Avery Johnson (COY)	Avery Johnson	
2006–07	NBA	Western	1st	Southwest	1st	67	15	.817	—	Lost First round (Warriors) 4–2	Dirk Nowitzki (MVP)	Avery Johnson	
2007–08	NBA	Western	7th	Southwest	4th	51	31	.622	5	Lost First round (Hornets) 4–1	—	Avery Johnson	
2008–09	NBA	Western	6th	Southwest	3rd	50	32	.610	4	Won First round (Spurs) 4–1; Lost conference semifinals (Nuggets) 4–1	Jason Terry (SIX)	Rick Carlisle	
2009–10	NBA	Western	2nd	Southwest	1st	55	27	.671	—	Lost First round (Spurs) 4–2	—	Rick Carlisle	
2010–11	NBA	Western	3rd	Southwest	2nd	57	25	.695	4	Won First round (Trail Blazers) 4–2; Won conference semifinals (Lakers) 4–0; Won conference finals (Thunder) 4–1; Won NBA Finals (Heat) 4–2	Dirk Nowitzki (FMVP)	Rick Carlisle	
2011–12 (Note: Due to a lockout, the season did not start until December 25, 2011 and all 30 teams played a shortened 66-game regular season schedule.)	NBA	Western	7th	Southwest	3rd	36	30	.545	14	Lost First round (Thunder) 4–0	Jason Kidd (SPOR)	Rick Carlisle	
2012–13	NBA	Western	10th	Southwest	4th	41	41	.500	19	—	—	Rick Carlisle	
2013–14	NBA	Western	8th	Southwest	4th	49	33	.598	13	Lost First round (Spurs) 4–3	—	Rick Carlisle	
2014–15	NBA	Western	7th	Southwest	4th	50	32	.610	6	Lost First round (Rockets) 4–1	—	Rick Carlisle	
2015–16	NBA	Western	6th	Southwest	2nd	42	40	.512	25	Lost First round (Thunder) 4–1	—	Rick Carlisle	
2016–17	NBA	Western	11th	Southwest	5th	33	49	.402	28	—	—	Rick Carlisle	
2017–18	NBA	Western	13th	Southwest	4th	24	58	.293	41	—	J.J. Barea (JWKC)	Rick Carlisle	
2018–19	NBA	Western	14th	Southwest	5th	33	49	.402	20	—	Luka Dončić (ROY)	Rick Carlisle	
2019–20	NBA	Western	7th	Southwest	2nd	43	32	.573	11	Lost First round (Clippers) 4–2	—	Rick Carlisle	
2020–21	NBA	Western	5th	Southwest	1st	42	30	.583	—	Lost First round (Clippers) 4–3	—	Rick Carlisle	
2021–22	NBA	Western	4th	Southwest	2nd	52	30	.634	4	Won First round (Jazz) 4–2; Won conference semifinals (Suns) 4–3; Lost conference finals (Warriors) 4–1	—	Jason Kidd	
2022–23	NBA	Western	11th	Southwest	3rd	38	44	.463	15	—	—	Jason Kidd	
2023–24	NBA	Western	5th	Southwest	1st	50	32	.610	7	Won First round (Clippers) 4–2; Won conference semifinals (Thunder) 4–2; Won conference finals (Timberwolves) 4–1; Lost NBA Finals (Celtics) 4–1	—	Jason Kidd	
2024–25	NBA	Western	9th (Note: Earned 9th seed after beating the Sacramento Kings in the NBA play-in tournament.)	Southwest	3rd	39	43	.476	29	—	—	Jason Kidd	
2025–26	NBA	Western	12th	Southwest	4th	26	56	.317	38	—	Cooper Flagg (ROY)	Jason Kidd	
Regular Season Record						1,862	1,845	.502	1980–present				
Playoff Record						118	131	.474	Playoff Series Record: 22–24				
Combined Record						1,980	1,976	.501	1 NBA championship, 3 conference championships, 5 division championships				
