= List of Toronto Raptors seasons =

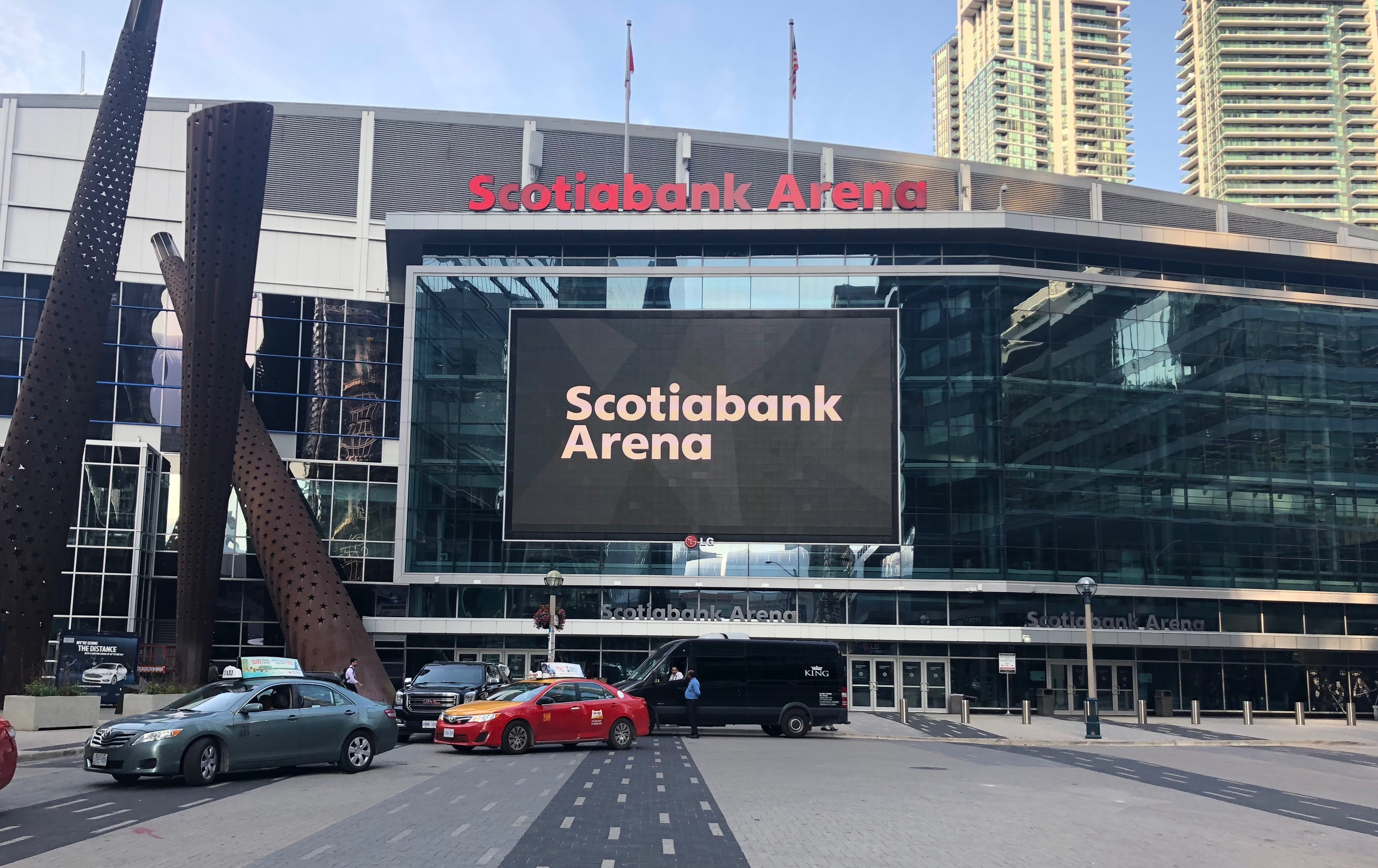
Scotiabank Arena, formerly Air Canada Centre, has served as the home arena of the Toronto Raptors since the 1998–99 season.

This is a list of seasons completed by the Toronto Raptors National Basketball Association (NBA) franchise. They are the only franchise not based in the United States to win the NBA title (in 2019).

== Table key ==
**Bold**	Franchise record
GP	Number of regular season games
W	Number of regular season wins
L	Number of regular season losses
Finish	Final position in conference or division standings
ROY	Rookie of the Year
SIX	Sixth Man of the Year
DPOY	Defensive Player of the Year
COY	Coach of the Year
EOY	Executive of the Year

== Seasons ==
Note: Statistics are correct as of the conclusion of the 2025–26 season.

**NBA champions**	**Conference champions**	**Division champions**	**Playoff berth**	**Play-in berth**

Season	League	Conference	Finish	Division	Finish	Regular season				Playoffs	Awards	Head coach
Season	League	Conference	Finish	Division	Finish	GP	W	L	Pct.	Playoffs	Awards	Head coach
1995–96	NBA	Eastern	14th	Central	8th	82	21	61	.256		Damon Stoudamire (ROY)	Brendan Malone
1996–97	NBA	Eastern	12th	Central	8th	82	30	52	.366			Darrell Walker
1997–98	NBA	Eastern	15th	Central	8th	82	16	66	.195			Darrell Walker; Butch Carter
1998–99^{[a]}	NBA	Eastern	10th	Central	6th	50	23	27	.460		Vince Carter (ROY)	Butch Carter
1999–2000	NBA	Eastern	6th	Central	3rd	82	45	37	.549	Lost First round (Knicks) 3–0		Butch Carter
2000–01	NBA	Eastern	5th	Central	2nd	82	47	35	.573	**Won** First round (Knicks) 3–2; Lost conference semifinals (76ers) 4–3		Lenny Wilkens
2001–02	NBA	Eastern	7th	Central	3rd	82	42	40	.512	Lost First round (Pistons) 3–2		Lenny Wilkens
2002–03	NBA	Eastern	14th	Central	7th	82	24	58	.293			Lenny Wilkens
2003–04	NBA	Eastern	10th	Central	6th	82	33	49	.402			Kevin O'Neill
2004–05	NBA	Eastern	12th	Atlantic	4th	82	33	49	.402			Sam Mitchell
2005–06	NBA	Eastern	12th	Atlantic	4th	82	27	55	.329			Sam Mitchell
2006–07	NBA	Eastern	3rd	**Atlantic**	**1st**	82	47	35	.573	Lost First round (Nets) 4–2	Sam Mitchell (COY); Bryan Colangelo (EOY)	Sam Mitchell
2007–08	NBA	Eastern	6th	Atlantic	2nd	82	41	41	.500	Lost First round (Magic) 4–1		Sam Mitchell
2008–09	NBA	Eastern	13th	Atlantic	4th	82	33	49	.402			Sam Mitchell; Jay Triano
2009–10	NBA	Eastern	9th	Atlantic	2nd	82	40	42	.488			Jay Triano
2010–11	NBA	Eastern	14th	Atlantic	5th	82	22	60	.268			Jay Triano
2011–12^{[b]}	NBA	Eastern	11th	Atlantic	4th	66	23	43	.348			Dwane Casey
2012–13	NBA	Eastern	10th	Atlantic	5th	82	34	48	.415			Dwane Casey
2013–14	NBA	Eastern	3rd	**Atlantic**	**1st**	82	48	34	.585	Lost First round (Nets) 4–3		Dwane Casey
2014–15	NBA	Eastern	4th	**Atlantic**	**1st**	82	49	33	.598	Lost First round (Wizards) 4–0	Lou Williams (SIX)	Dwane Casey
2015–16	NBA	Eastern	2nd	**Atlantic**	**1st**	82	56	26	.683	**Won** First round (Pacers) 4–3; **Won** conference semifinals (Heat) 4–3; Lost conference finals (Cavaliers) 4–2		Dwane Casey
2016–17	NBA	Eastern	3rd	Atlantic	2nd	82	51	31	.622	**Won** First round (Bucks) 4–2; Lost conference semifinals (Cavaliers) 4–0		Dwane Casey
2017–18	NBA	Eastern	1st	**Atlantic**	**1st**	82	59	23	.720	**Won** First round (Wizards) 4–2; Lost conference semifinals (Cavaliers) 4–0	Dwane Casey (COY)	Dwane Casey
2018–19	**NBA**	**Eastern**	2nd	**Atlantic**	**1st**	82	58	24	.707	**Won** First round (Magic) 4–1; **Won** conference semifinals (76ers) 4–3; **Won** conference finals (Bucks) 4–2; **Won** NBA Finals (Warriors) 4–2	Kawhi Leonard (FMVP); Pascal Siakam (MIP)	Nick Nurse
2019–20^{[c]}	NBA	Eastern	2nd	**Atlantic**	**1st**	72	53	19	.736	**Won** First round (Nets) 4–0; Lost conference semifinals (Celtics) 4–3	Nick Nurse (COY)	Nick Nurse
2020–21^{[d]}	NBA	Eastern	12th	Atlantic	5th	72	27	45	.375			Nick Nurse
2021–22	NBA	Eastern	5th	Atlantic	3rd	82	48	34	.585	Lost First round (76ers) 4–2	Scottie Barnes (ROY)	Nick Nurse
2022–23	NBA	Eastern	9th^{[e]}	Atlantic	5th	82	41	41	.500			Nick Nurse
2023–24	NBA	Eastern	12th	Atlantic	5th	82	25	57	.305			Darko Rajaković
2024–25	NBA	Eastern	11th	Atlantic	3rd	82	30	52	.366			Darko Rajaković
2025–26	NBA	Eastern	5th	Atlantic	3rd	82	46	36	.561	Lost First round (Cavaliers) 4–3		Darko Rajaković

Notes

- **^{a}** Lockout-shortened season (50 games)
- **^{b}** Lockout-shortened season (66 games)
- **^{c}** Season suspended mid-season due to the global COVID-19 pandemic (72 games)
- **^{d}** Start of season delayed due to the global COVID-19 pandemic (72 games)
- **^{e}** Fell to the 10th seed after losing to the Chicago Bulls in the NBA play-in tournament.

== All-time records ==
As of May 3, 2026

Statistic	Totals			
Statistic	Played	Wins	Losses	Pct.
All-time regular season record (1995–2026)	2,474	1,172	1,302	.474
All-time play-in game record (1995–2026)	1	0	1	.000
All-time post-season record (1995–2026)	130	60	70	.462
All-time post-season series record (1995–2026)	23	10	13	.435
NBA championships	1			
Conference championships	1			
Division championships	7			
Playoff appearances	13			
