= History of the New Orleans Pelicans =

The New Orleans Pelicans are a professional basketball team in the National Basketball Association (NBA). The team commenced play in 2002 after the NBA granted founder George Shinn an expansion franchise to play in New Orleans. The Pelicans' establishment was unusual compared to most modern expansion teams in that New Orleans' roster was not stocked through an expansion draft. Instead, Shinn transferred the entire basketball organization (including player contracts) of his former team, the Charlotte Hornets, to his new franchise.

For its first eleven seasons, the team used the Hornets nickname. It competed as part of the Central Division of the Eastern Conference for its first two seasons, and since 2004 has been a member of the Southwest Division of the Western Conference. Due to the devastation to New Orleans caused by Hurricane Katrina in 2005, the team effectively executed a temporary relocation to Oklahoma City for the following two seasons, during which they were known as the New Orleans/Oklahoma City Hornets. Financial troubles eventually compelled Shinn to sell the franchise back to the league during the 2010–11 season.

The acquisition of the team's current name came along with the purchase of the franchise from the league by Tom Benson. Early on in the purchasing process, Benson made it clear that he intended to change the name to something more "local". Inspiration for the name change is given to Louisiana's state bird, the brown pelican. The Pelicans have been owned by Benson's widow Gayle Benson since her husband's death in 2018. In 18 seasons of play the New Orleans franchise has achieved an overall regular season record of 740–864 (.461) and qualified for the playoffs eight times.

== Roots ==
=== Basketball in New Orleans ===
New Orleans had been a founding member of the ABA with the New Orleans Buccaneers (1967–1970), but the lack of a dedicated arena and a poor performance record led the team to relocate to Memphis. The city acquired an NBA expansion franchise in June 1974, but the New Orleans Jazz faced a number of the same logistical and financial woes, and relocated to Salt Lake City in 1979. In 1994, the Minnesota Timberwolves were suffering financially and an ownership group almost purchased the team and moved it to New Orleans. The Timberwolves would have played at the Louisiana Superdome until a new arena was constructed. Financial problems, however, led to the NBA blocking the move. New Orleans would attempt to chase the Vancouver Grizzlies before finally landing another team in 2002.

=== George Shinn moves his organization to New Orleans ===
In 1987, the NBA awarded an expansion team to Charlotte named the Charlotte Hornets owned by George Shinn and a few other businessmen. While the Hornets continued to put a competitive team on the court, the team's attendance fell dramatically. Many attributed this lapse in popularity to the owner George Shinn, who was slowly becoming despised by the people of the city. In 1997, a Charlotte woman claimed that Shinn had raped her, and the resulting trial severely tarnished his reputation in the city. The consensus was that while Charlotte was a basketball city, fans took out their anger at Shinn on the team. Shinn had also become discontented with the Coliseum, which had been considered state-of-the-art when it opened but had since been considered obsolete due to a limited number of luxury boxes. On March 26, 2001, both the Hornets and the Vancouver Grizzlies applied for relocation to Memphis, Tennessee, which was eventually won by the Grizzlies. Shinn then issued an ultimatum that unless the city built a new arena at no cost to him, the Hornets would leave town. The city initially refused, leading Shinn to consider moving the team to either Norfolk, Louisville, or St. Louis. Of the cities in the running, only St. Louis had an NBA-ready arena, the Savvis Center, already in place and was a larger media market than Charlotte at the time; also, it was the only one of the four to have previously had an NBA franchise — the St. Louis Hawks, who moved to Atlanta in 1968.

Finally, a new arena in Uptown, what would eventually become the Spectrum Center, was included in a non-binding referendum for a larger arts-related package, and Shinn withdrew his application to move the team. Polls showed the referendum on its way to passage. However, just days before the referendum, Mayor Pat McCrory vetoed a living wage ordinance. The veto prompted many of the city's black ministers to oppose the referendum; they felt it was immoral for the city to build a new arena when city employees were not paid enough to make a living. After the failed referendum, city leaders devised a plan to build a new arena in a way that did not require voter support, but made it known that they would not even consider building it unless Shinn sold the team. While even the NBA acknowledged that Shinn had alienated fans, league officials felt such a demand would anger other owners as it could set a precedent. The city council refused to remove the statement, leading the Hornets to request a move to New Orleans, returning the NBA to that city after the Jazz relocated to Salt Lake City in 1979. Although New Orleans was a smaller television market, a deal was quickly made to play at the New Orleans Arena, next door to the Louisiana Superdome. Before the Hornets were eliminated from the playoffs, the NBA approved the deal. As part of a deal, as well as to avoid a Browns-like lawsuit, the NBA promised that Charlotte would get a new team, which became the Charlotte Bobcats two years later.

In a 2008 interview with the Charlotte Observer, Shinn, who has not returned to Charlotte since the Hornets moved, admitted that the "bad judgment I made in my life" played a role in the Hornets' departure. He also said that if he had it to do all over again, he would not have withdrawn from the public after the sexual assault trial. Shinn emphasized how he was making amends by committing to New Orleans saying, "I've made enough mistakes in my life. I'm not going to make one here. This city needs us here. We're going to make this (New Orleans) thing work."

== New Orleans Hornets ==
=== 2002–2005: Inaugural seasons ===
The Hornets opened their inaugural season in New Orleans on October 30, 2002, against New Orleans' original NBA franchise, the Utah Jazz. In the first regular season NBA game played in New Orleans in over 17 years, the Hornets defeated the Jazz 100–75, and posthumously retired #7 of "Pistol" Pete Maravich during halftime. Despite nagging injuries to the teams's starting point guard, Baron Davis, the Hornets finished the season with a 47–35 record and qualified for the 2003 playoffs. They were defeated by Philadelphia four games to two in the first round.

Following the season, the team fired head coach Paul Silas and replaced him with Tim Floyd. In the 2003 NBA draft, the Hornets selected David West, who would become a future All-Star with the franchise. The Hornets began the 2003–04 season strong with a 17–7 start, but sputtered at the end and finished 41–41, narrowly missing home court advantage in the first round of the 2004 playoffs. They met the Miami Heat in the first round three years after having swept them in the 2001 NBA Playoffs, but the Heat defeated the Hornets in seven games.

After the season, Floyd was fired and the team hired Byron Scott as their new head coach. Due to the NBA realigning divisions for the season, the Hornets began playing in the tougher Southwest Division of the Western Conference, which had four playoff teams the previous season, and the team was not expected to compete for a playoff spot. In a season marred by injury to the team's three all-stars (Baron Davis, Jamaal Magloire, and Jamal Mashburn) an 0–8 start became a 2–29 record. As a result of the lack of success, the team's roster was reshaped, with older veterans like Baron Davis and Jamal Mashburn traded to start the rebuilding process. The team finished the year with a franchise-worst record of 18–64 and their first losing season in franchise history

=== 2005–2007: Hurricane Katrina and temporary relocation to Oklahoma City ===
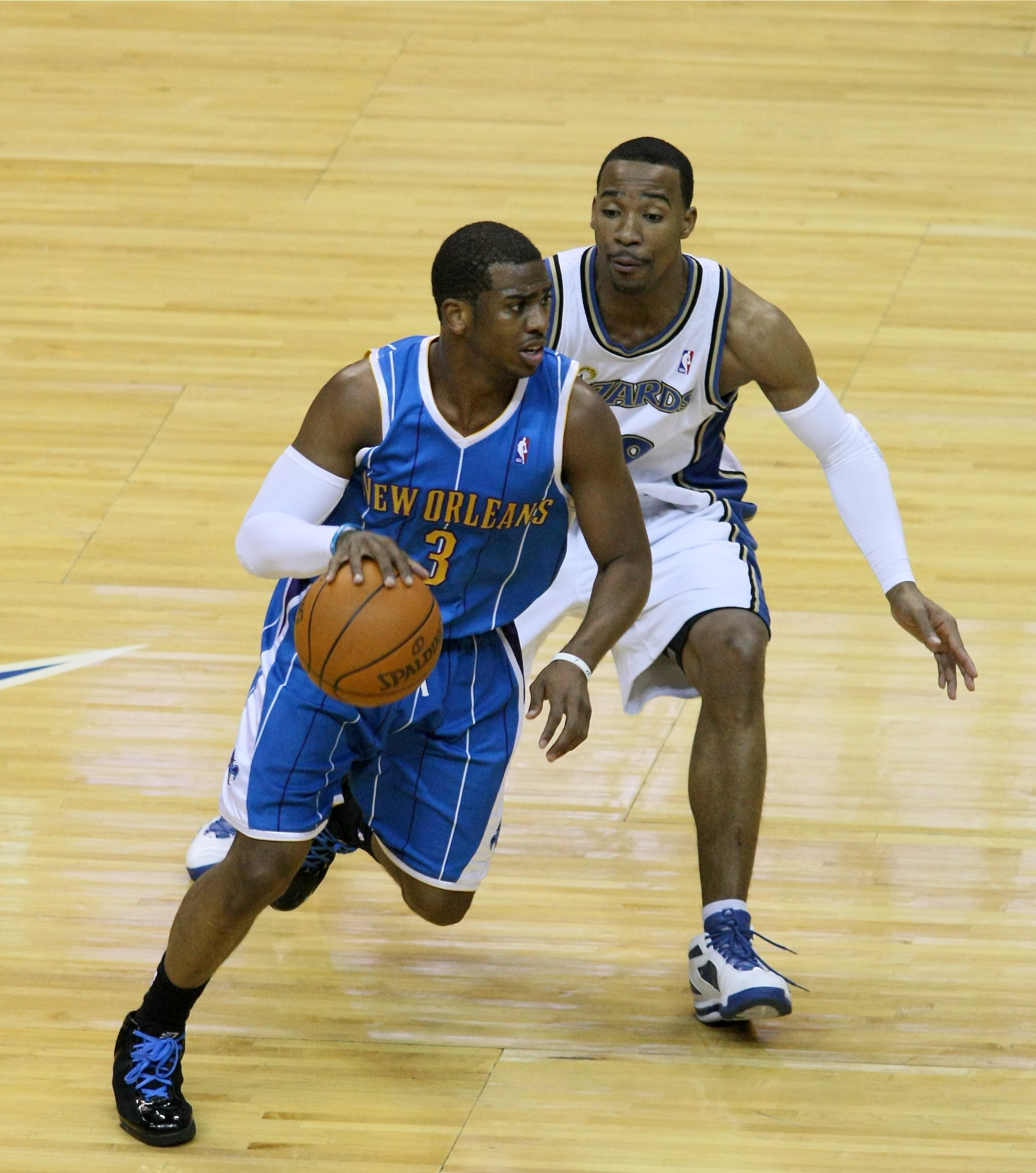
Chris Paul was selected by the Hornets with the 4th pick of the 2005 NBA draft.

Due to the devastation brought by Hurricane Katrina upon the communities of southeastern Louisiana, the Hornets franchise temporarily relocated their operations to Oklahoma City in 2005–06 and 2006–07. During this time, the franchise was known as the New Orleans/Oklahoma City Hornets. In these two seasons, the vast majority of home games were played at the Ford Center in Oklahoma City, while a few remained at New Orleans Arena. Their practice facility in Oklahoma City was the Sawyer Center on the campus of Southern Nazarene University (SNU) and the team held its 2006 training camp at their New Orleans practice facility, the Alario Center in Westwego, Louisiana.

With the fourth pick in the 2005 NBA draft, the Hornets picked future all-star point guard Chris Paul. For the 2005–06 season, the team played 36 games in Oklahoma City, with one game taking place at the Lloyd Noble Center on the campus of the University of Oklahoma, three in New Orleans, and one at the Pete Maravich Assembly Center on the campus of Louisiana State University (LSU). The intent had been to play five games in all at Baton Rouge, but the restoration progress made on New Orleans Arena made the return to New Orleans a better option. They started off the 2005–06 NBA season better than expected, and the team briefly held the sixth seed in the Western playoff race. The team then lost 12 out of 13 games to drop out of playoff contention, while also setting an NBA record when they only scored 16 points in the second half of a game against the Los Angeles Clippers. The Hornets finished 38–44 and tenth place in the Western Conference. Despite the losing record, Chris Paul won the NBA Rookie of the Year Award in a landslide.

The Hornets made major roster changes after the 2005–06 season in hopes of advancing to the Western Conference postseason for the first time. They traded J.R. Smith and P.J. Brown to the Chicago Bulls for Tyson Chandler, let Speedy Claxton sign with the Atlanta Hawks, but filled their backup point guard position with free agents Bobby Jackson and Jannero Pargo. They also inked Peja Stojaković from the Indiana Pacers. The Hornets opted to stay in Oklahoma City for the 2006–07 season, but promised to return to New Orleans full-time. Although the New Orleans Arena was capable of hosting the team, it was felt that the recovery efforts in New Orleans were not far along enough for the area to support a full NBA schedule. During the 2006–07 season, the Hornets played 35 home games in Oklahoma City and six in New Orleans. The team finished the regular season with a 39–43 record, one more win than the previous season, and missed the playoffs again.

The team's successful operation in Oklahoma City arguably contributed to the city being named as the new home for the Seattle SuperSonics franchise starting in the 2008–09 NBA season as the Oklahoma City Thunder.

=== 2007–2010: Return to New Orleans ===
The Hornets franchise returned to New Orleans full-time for the 2007–08 season with all 41 home games played in the New Orleans Arena. League officials had stressed from the beginning the desire for the franchise to return to New Orleans once it proved feasible and that they would make a good-faith effort to assist with the recovery. To that end, the 2008 NBA All-Star Game and its accompanying festivities were awarded to New Orleans and a serious marketing campaign was commenced in February 2007. Subsequently, various corporate sponsorship agreements were signed (under the umbrella of the Crescent City Champions), with Dr Pepper Snapple Group, Capital One, and Cox Communications among them. The Hornets made few organizational changes heading into the 2007–08 season, signing free agents Morris Peterson and Melvin Ely, while letting go of former first round draft pick Cedric Simmons. The club also extended the contract of reserve guard Jannero Pargo and selected Kansas forward Julian Wright with the 13th pick in the 2007 NBA draft.

Attendance at the New Orleans Arena, while tepid at first, picked up considerably in the months of March and April 2008 with the team registering sell-outs in 12 of its last 17 regular season home games, and the final 13 total games including playoffs. Healthier than previous seasons, the Hornets held a 29–12 record at the halfway mark. Having the best record in the Western Conference on February 3 meant that Byron Scott would coach the 2008 Western Conference All-Stars at home in the New Orleans Arena. Scott was joined by two of his players, as both Chris Paul and David West were selected as All-Star reserves. Chris Paul was nominated for NBA MVP 2008 and placed second in voting. On February 21, the Hornets made an in-season trade with the Houston Rockets acquiring swingman Bonzi Wells and backup point guard Mike James for veteran guard Bobby Jackson.

The Hornets completed the regular season with a record of 56–26, making the season their most successful ever. The Hornets also won their first division title, winning the Southwest Division ahead of the San Antonio Spurs. Having clinched the second overall seed for the Western Conference, the Hornets beat the Dallas Mavericks in the first round. The Hornets won the first two games against the third seed San Antonio Spurs in the Western Conference semi-finals, but eventually lost to the defending champion Spurs three games to four.

In August 2008, the Hornets unveiled a modified logo and new uniforms with the colors of Creole blue, purple, and Mardi Gras gold, and after six seasons, the pinstripes were reinstated on the uniforms. The script was changed as an allusion to the wrought iron architecture of New Orleans. An additional third logo was introduced, with the "NOLA" abbreviation and a trumpet. The team also publicly announced the sale of over 10,000 season tickets for the 2008–09 season.

Having experienced the most successful season in franchise history, both in the regular season and the playoffs, the 2009 NBA season was viewed with great expectations for the Hornets franchise. Several pundits picked the Hornets to repeat as winners of the Southwest Division and as a potential Western Conference champion. The core players from the previous season were all back for 2008–09. Swingman James Posey was signed as a free agent from the Boston Celtics in July, while reserve guard Jannero Pargo opted for the Russian Basketball Super League. In December, the Hornets solidified the point guard position by acquiring Antonio Daniels in a three-team deal, giving up seldom-used guard Mike James and a future second-round draft pick. On February 18, the team announced that starting center Tyson Chandler had been traded to the Oklahoma City Thunder for forwards Joe Smith and Chris Wilcox in what was generally perceived as a payroll-shedding move. However, within a day, the trade was rescinded due to concerns regarding Chandler's turf toe. For the second year in a row the Hornets were represented with two players at the NBA All Star Game as Chris Paul was voted in by the fans as a starter, and David West was selected as a reserve by the NBA coaches.

The Hornets' 2008–09 season was uneven, with injuries to Tyson Chandler and Peja Stojaković hampering the team's efforts. The Hornets finished the season with a 49–33 record, fourth in the Southwest Division, and seventh in the Western Conference. Facing the Denver Nuggets in the first round of the 2009 NBA Playoffs, the Hornets lost both of the first two games decisively in Denver. They won the third game of the series at home, but then tied the record for worst loss in playoff history with a score of 121–63, which was also the worst defeat in any regular or postseason game for a home team. The Hornets were subsequently eliminated from the 2009 NBA playoffs in game five.

In the aftermath of the 2008–09 NBA season and the in-season attempt to trade starting center Tyson Chandler for expiring contracts, the New Orleans Hornets were widely perceived to be looking to trim the payroll. Indeed, at the start of the NBA free agency period on July 1, the Hornets had the highest payroll of all teams in the league, topping $77 million. When the luxury tax level was set on July 7, it left the Hornets in excess of $7 million in the tax zone. On July 28, the Hornets traded for center Emeka Okafor from the Charlotte Bobcats for Tyson Chandler. While the move allowed the Hornets to shed $1.3 million of the 2009–10 payroll, they also took on the remainder of Okafor's contract valued at just under $63 million for five years. On June 25, 2009, the Hornets drafted Darren Collison with the 21st pick of the 2009 NBA draft. The Hornets also traded two future second round picks to the Miami Heat for the 43rd pick Marcus Thornton. On August 12, 2009, the Hornets traded starter Rasual Butler to the Clippers for a 2016 second round draft pick, in another attempt to lower the payroll. Butler was slated to earn $3.9 million for the season, but due to the Hornets being in the tax zone, those savings were effectively doubled. Further, on September 9, the Hornets traded guard Antonio Daniels to the Minnesota Timberwolves for guard Bobby Brown and forward Darius Songaila. The conscious effort to get below the luxury tax threshold continued during the season. First, backup center Hilton Armstrong was traded along with cash considerations to the Sacramento Kings for a conditional 2016 second round draft pick. Shortly thereafter, starting shooting guard Devin Brown was traded to the Chicago Bulls for reserve center Aaron Gray and backup guard Bobby Brown was traded to the Los Angeles Clippers for a conditional 2nd round draft pick. In total, these trades got the Hornets just below the luxury tax threshold.

On the court, head coach Byron Scott was fired on November 12, 2009, after a 3–6 start to the season. General manager Jeff Bower took over the head coaching duties for the remainder of the season. The Hornets overcame the bad start to the season and were as high as sixth in the Western Conference standings in late January. In the second to last game of January, Chris Paul was injured trying to save an errant pass going out of bounds and was out for most of the rest of the season. The few highlights came from rookies Darren Collison and Marcus Thornton; Collison achieved the longest stretch of games with at least 18 points and 9 assists (7 in a row in February) for a rookie since Oscar Robertson and both rookies made the all-rookie teams after the season, a first in franchise history.

The Hornets finished the season with a 37–45 record, finishing last in the Southwest Division. Jeff Bower resigned as head coach to concentrate on his front office duties, but was fired by the Hornets on July 13, 2010, ending a tenure of nearly 15 years within the organization. In between Bower's stepping down as head coach and his dismissal from the organization, Monty Williams was brought in as new head coach. The former assistant coach of the Portland Trail Blazers was, at 38 years old, the youngest head coach in the league. To replace Bower as general manager, the Hornets hired Dell Demps of the San Antonio Spurs in late July.

=== 2010–2012: Roster overhaul and ownership issues ===
With a new head coach and a new general manager, entered the offseason with uncertainty. Minority owner Gary Chouest was attempting to buy out long-term owner George Shinn and become sole owner of the organization. All-star point guard Chris Paul had also expressed his desire to be on a winning team. The roster was then overhauled for the new coach and manager, while also trying to appease Paul.

At the 2010 NBA draft, former lottery pick Cole Aldrich and guard Morris Peterson were traded to the Oklahoma City Thunder for the 21st and 26th picks in the draft, which were subsequently used on forwards Craig Brackins and Quincy Pondexter. On August 11, the Hornets traded rookie Darren Collison and James Posey to the Indiana Pacers for small forward Trevor Ariza from the Houston Rockets in a four-team trade. In a separate trade on the same day, another former lottery pick Julian Wright was traded to the Toronto Raptors for shooting guard Marco Belinelli. On September 23, 2010, the Hornets sent rookie Craig Brackins and power forward Darius Songaila to the Philadelphia 76ers for guard Willie Green and center Jason Smith. Finally, just before the start of the regular season on October 23, the Hornets acquired point guard Jerryd Bayless from the Portland Trail Blazers for a conditional first round draft pick.

The overhaul of the roster lead to the team getting younger and more athletic and potentially while simultaneously cutting the relatively underperforming Peterson, Posey and Wright. The cost primarily was the loss of Collison and potentially the future first round draft pick. When the 2010–11 NBA season started, only three players (Paul, West and Stojakovic) were left from the team that won the Southwest Division two years prior. The team started the season with five straight wins, a team record for opening a season. The team then extended the streak to eight straight wins. The team also held their first ten opponents to below 100 points. Later in the season, the team tied a club record with ten straight wins on January 26, 2011. The team qualified for the 2011 NBA Playoffs, where they lost to the Lakers four games to two.

Off-court in the 2010–11 season, the buyout by Chouest fell through in early December 2010 and because Shinn was not in a financial position to continue to run the team, the NBA purchased the team for an estimated $300 million while it looked for a local owner. Larry Ellison, CEO of Oracle Corporation who previously tried to buy the Golden State Warriors, said he offered to purchase the team but was "slightly outbid" by the league. On January 24, 2011, the state, city, and local businesses of New Orleans came together and raised enough money to buy enough tickets to block an escape clause that would have allowed the team to walk away from its lease at New Orleans Arena because of low attendance.

Before the 2011–12 NBA season, the Hornets were considering trade offers for Chris Paul and he requested a trade to the New York Knicks. The Hornets looked at many teams, including the Boston Celtics and the Golden State Warriors as trade partners, but Paul had made it clear he wanted to be traded to New York or Los Angeles. A three-team trade involving the Los Angeles Lakers and the Houston Rockets was agreed upon, but commissioner David Stern vetoed the trade. On December 14, 2011, the Hornets agreed to a deal with the Los Angeles Clippers that would send Paul to L.A. in exchange for Eric Gordon, Chris Kaman, Al-Farouq Aminu, and a first-round draft pick acquired by the Clippers from a trade with the Minnesota Timberwolves in 2004.

At the end of the 66-game lockout-shortened 2011–12 NBA season, the Hornets had the worst record in the West, 21–45.

=== 2012–2013: Anthony Davis arrives ===
On April 13, 2012, it was announced that Tom Benson, owner of the New Orleans Saints, had purchased the franchise from the NBA for $338 million. In addition, Benson announced that he would change the team name to something that would better suit the region, fueling rumors that the Hornets name could one day return to Charlotte, where the Bobcats play. In June 2012, Benson appointed two senior Saints executives to supervise the Hornets as well: Saints general manager Mickey Loomis became head of basketball operations, overseeing general manager Dell Demps, and Saints business operations head Dennis Lauscha took on the same role with the Hornets.

The Hornets traded Emeka Okafor and Trevor Ariza to the Wizards for Rashard Lewis, whom they bought out, and a draft pick.

On May 30, 2012, the Hornets were awarded the first overall pick in the 2012 NBA draft and subsequently drafted Anthony Davis. They also drafted Austin Rivers with the 10th pick (acquired from the Clippers as part of the Chris Paul trade).

On July 11, 2012, Ryan Anderson, 2012's Most Improved Player and three-point field goals leader, was acquired in a sign-and-trade by the New Orleans Hornets, with the Orlando Magic, for Gustavo Ayón. New owner Tom Benson had indicated early in his ownership that he wished to change the team's name to something more local, even preferring that the Utah Jazz – founded in New Orleans in 1974 and played there until 1979, give up the "Jazz" name. But the Jazz indicated they had no interest in returning the name due to over 30 years of history associated with it. Benson had also heavily favored the names "Brass" and "Krewe".

On December 4, 2012, Yahoo! Sports reported that the Hornets would change their name to the New Orleans Pelicans beginning with the 2013–14 season. The team name is inspired by Louisiana's state bird, the brown pelican. The name "Pelicans" can be traced back in New Orleans to the 1865 founding of the New Orleans Pelicans, an amateur baseball team. In 1887, the team became a professional franchise when it joined the minor league Southern League which operated off and on until 1899. In 1901, the Pelicans became a founding member of the minor league Southern Association which lasted until 1957. In 1977, the Pelicans name briefly resurfaced for one season when the Triple-A minor league Tulsa Oilers moved to New Orleans before moving to Springfield, Illinois, upon completion of the 1977 season.

The Hornets organization unveiled the team's new logos and navy blue-gold-red color scheme in a press conference on January 24, 2013.

== New Orleans Pelicans ==
=== 2013–2019: The Anthony Davis era ===
On April 18, 2013, after the end of the team's 2012–13 season, the team's name was officially changed to the Pelicans.

On June 27, 2013, during the 2013 NBA draft, the Pelicans selected Nerlens Noel 6th overall, and traded him along with a 2014 protected first-round pick for All-Star point guard Jrue Holiday of the Philadelphia 76ers and the 42nd pick, Pierre Jackson.

Following the New Orleans franchise's 2013 disestablishment of the "Hornets" name, on May 21, 2013, Charlotte Bobcats owner Michael Jordan announced the organization had submitted an application to change the name of his franchise to the Charlotte Hornets for the 2014–15 NBA season pending a majority vote for approval by the NBA Board of Governors at a meeting in Las Vegas, on July 18, 2013. Then-NBA Deputy Commissioner and COO Adam Silver had previously pointed out the fact that the league owns the rights to the name Hornets and that could speed up the process. The NBA unanimously approved the name change starting with 2014–15. The Bobcats became the Charlotte Hornets on May 20, 2014. In addition, the newly renamed Hornets acquired the records and history of the original Hornets from 1988 to 2002, while the Pelicans kept the remaining records from the 2002–03 season onward.

Just before the start of the 2013–2014 season, the Pelicans announced they had broken the 2008–2009 team record for season tickets sold. Sales hit 12,000 season tickets for the first time in franchise history.

=== 2015: Return to the playoffs ===
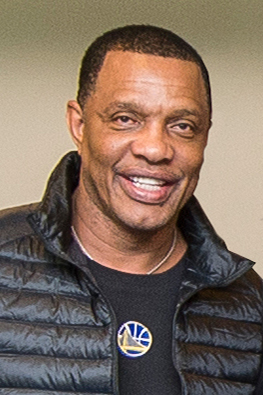
Alvin Gentry coached the team from 2015 to 2020

For the second season under the name Pelicans, the team qualified for the playoffs with a 45–37 record as the number 8 seed in the Western Conference. They owned the tie-breaker over the Oklahoma City Thunder by winning the regular season head-to-head series 3–1, and they faced the Golden State Warriors in the first round; the Warriors swept the Pelicans in four games. After the season, the Pelicans fired coach Monty Williams despite qualifying for the playoffs.

On May 31, 2015, the Pelicans hired Alvin Gentry as the franchise's 6th head coach.

=== 2019–present: Rebuilding and Zion Williamson era ===
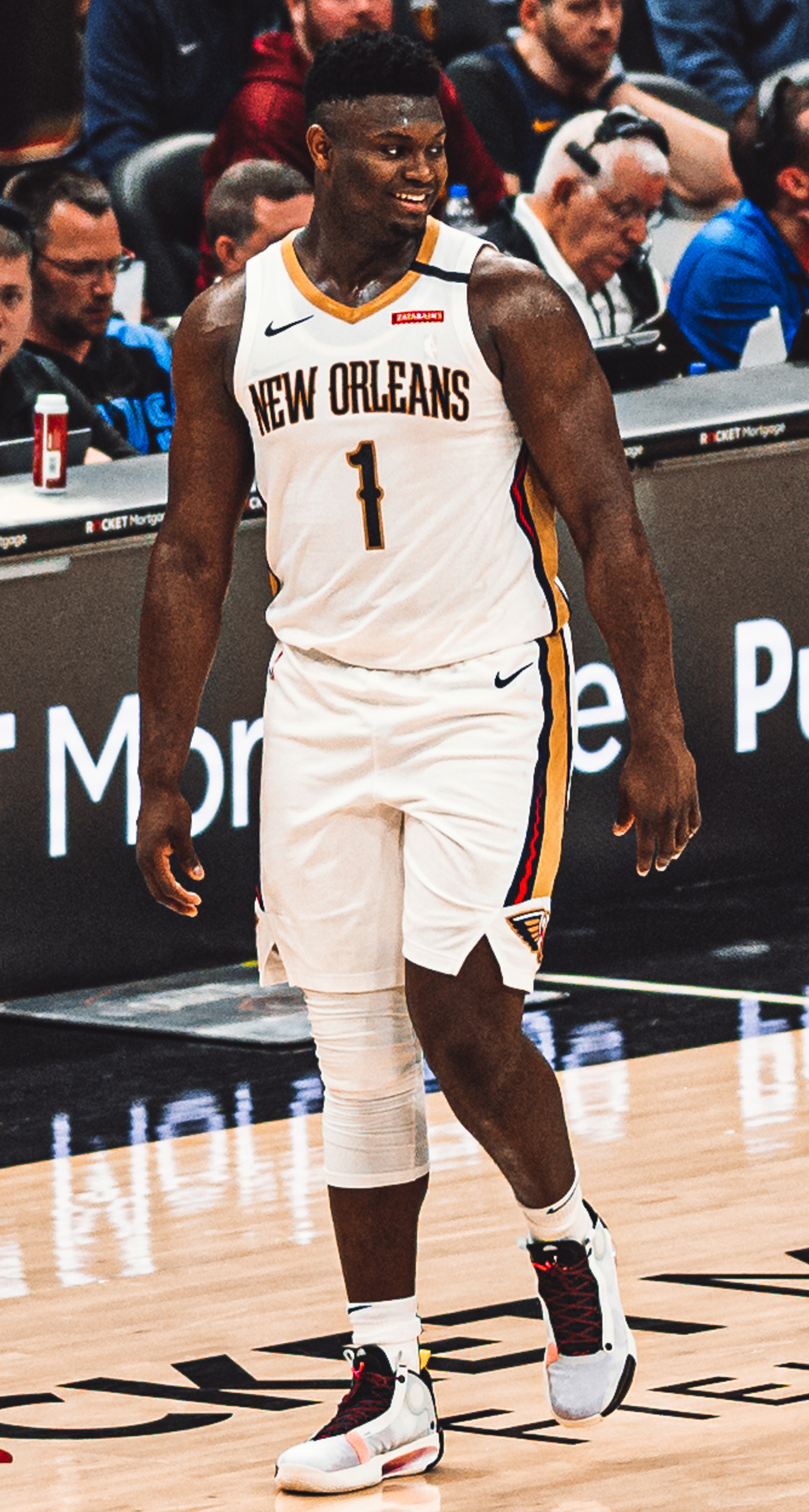
Zion Williamson

On April 17, 2019, the Pelicans named David Griffin as the new executive vice president of basketball operations. On May 19, 2019, the Pelicans named former Brooklyn Nets assistant general manager Trajan Langdon their newest general manager, replacing interim general manager Danny Ferry.

On June 15, 2019, the Pelicans agreed to trade Davis to the Los Angeles Lakers. In return, the Lakers agreed to send Lonzo Ball, Brandon Ingram, Josh Hart and three first-round picks, including the fourth overall pick in the 2019 NBA draft, to the Pelicans. The Pelicans later agreed to trade draft rights of the fourth overall pick of the 2019 NBA draft to the Atlanta Hawks, receiving the draft rights to the eighth, 17th and 35th picks in the 2019 NBA draft.

On June 20, 2019, the Pelicans selected Zion Williamson with the first overall pick. The team also drafted Alen Smailagić and Jordan Bone, both of whom were immediately traded to the Golden State Warriors and Atlanta Hawks, respectively. The Pelicans then received Jaxson Hayes, Nickeil Alexander-Walker and Marcos Louzada Silva from Hawks. On July 1, the Pelicans announced that they signed Williamson to his rookie-scale contract. However, the Pelicans began the 2019–20 season without Williamson as he had a knee surgery following an injury in the preseason. He made his debut on January 22, 2020, scoring 22 points in 18 minutes of play. On March 3, 2020, Williamson was named the NBA Rookie of the Month for the month of February. During the month, Williamson averaged 25.7 points, 6.2 rebounds, 2.6 assists, and 1.0 steal a game.

Brandon Ingram had a breakout season. On December 30, 2019, Ingram was named the Western Conference Player of the Week for games played between December 23 to December 29. During the week, Ingram averaged 25.3 points, 7.3 rebounds, 4.5 assists, and 2.0 steals per game while shooting 49.3 percent from the field and 54.2 percent from three-point range. Ingram helped the Pelicans to a 4–0 week as a result. On January 16, 2020, Ingram recorded a career-high by scoring 49 points in a 138–132 overtime win against the Utah Jazz. Ingram gave the Pelicans a one-point lead with a fadeaway jumper with 0.2 seconds remaining in regulation. This was before Rudy Gobert was fouled and subsequently sent the game to overtime with a free throw. Because of his breakout season, Ingram became an NBA All-Star for the first time in his career. Ingram also won the 2020 Most Improved Player award.

Following the suspension of the 2019–20 NBA season, the Pelicans were one of the 22 teams invited to the NBA Bubble to participate in the final eight games of the regular season. On August 9, 2020, the Pelicans were eliminated from postseason contention when the Portland Trail Blazers defeated the Philadelphia 76ers.

In a trade with the Portland Trail Blazers, the Pelicans landed 2015-16 Most Improved Player CJ McCollum as well as Larry Nance Jr. and Tony Snell in exchange for Josh Hart, Nickeil Alexander-Walker, Tomáš Satoranský, Didi Louzada, a protected 2022 first-round draft pick, the better of New Orleans' and Portland's 2026 second-round draft picks and New Orleans' 2027 second-round draft pick. Despite Williamson missing the entire season with a right foot fracture, the Pelicans finished the 2021–22 NBA season with a 36–46 record, which earned them the ninth-place position in the Western Conference and a chance to make the playoffs through the play-in tournament. On April 13, 2022, the Pelicans defeated the 10th-place San Antonio Spurs 113–103 at home in the first round of the play-in and two days later defeated the eighth-place Los Angeles Clippers 105–101 on the road in the second round of the play-in to clinch the eighth seed and New Orleans' first playoff berth since 2018.

The Pelicans selected Dyson Daniels with the 8th overall pick in the 2022 draft. Zion was selected for his second All-Star game despite only playing 29 games. Other Pelicans players would also dealt with injuries, but the team still made the play-in for the second time in a row but failed to advance to the playoffs.

For the first time since his second season, Zion Williamson stayed healthy for a majority of the regular season, playing 70 games. 2021 draft second-round pickup Herb Jones made the All-Defensive First Team as the fourth Pelican to do so. The Pelicans finished 49–33, just shy of 50 wins and advanced to the play-in for the third year in a row. Zion Williamson dropped 40 points and grabbed 11 rebounds in a loss to the Lakers. In that game, Zion got injured, ending his season. Despite not having Williamson, the Pelicans beat the Kings and advanced to the playoffs where they were swept by the Oklahoma City Thunder.

==== 2024–present: Acquisition of Dejounte Murray and departure of Brandon Ingram ====
In the 2024 off-season, a blockbuster trade sent 2022 All-Star Dejounte Murray to the Pelicans in exchange for 2022 lottery pick Dyson Daniels to the Atlanta Hawks along with Larry Nance Jr., E.J. Liddell, Cody Zeller and some future draft picks.

On February 6, 2025, Brandon Ingram was traded to the Toronto Raptors in exchange for guard-forward Bruce Brown, center Kelly Olynyk, a 2026 first-round draft pick (via Indiana) and a 2031 second-round draft pick. On March 10, the NBA and Australia's National Basketball League (NBL) announced that in October 2025, the Pelicans would play two preseason games at Rod Laver Arena in Melbourne as part of the NBA x NBL: Melbourne Series.
