= NBA Sportsmanship Award =

National Basketball Association award

- Sport: Basketball
- League: National Basketball Association (NBA)
- Awarded for: NBA player who most exemplifies ideals of sportsmanship

History
- First award: 1995–96
- Most recent: Derrick White (Boston Celtics)

The NBA Sportsmanship Award is an annual National Basketball Association (NBA) award given to a player who most "exemplifies the ideals of sportsmanship on the court with ethical behavior, fair play, and integrity." It is directly analogous to the Kim Perrot Sportsmanship Award, which has been awarded by the NBA's sister league, the WNBA, with neither award demanding excellence of play.

Every year, each of the 30 NBA teams nominates one of its players to compete for this award. From these nominees, one player from each NBA division are selected by a panel as the divisional Sportsmanship Award winners. At the end of the regular season, players in the league cast votes for the award, with eleven points given for each first-place vote, nine for second-place vote, seven points for third, five points for fourth, three points for fifth and one point for each sixth place vote received. The player with the highest point total, regardless of the number of first-place votes, wins the award. Since 2000, winners have been presented with the Joe Dumars Trophy, named after the award's inaugural recipient who played for the Detroit Pistons.

Mike Conley has won the award four times; the most in NBA history. Grant Hill has won it three times while Kemba Walker, Jason Kidd, and Jrue Holiday have each won it twice.

== Winners ==
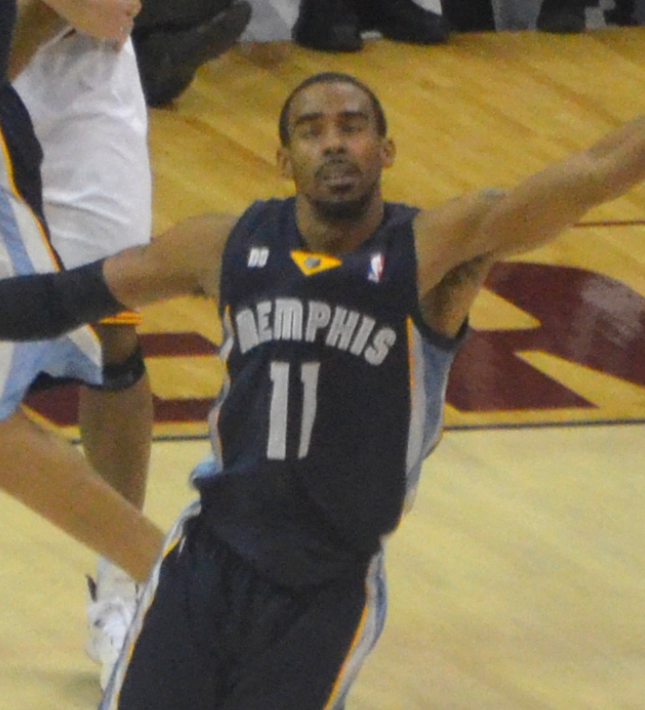
Mike Conley, a four-time holder of the NBA Sportsmanship Award and one of the few multiple time winners

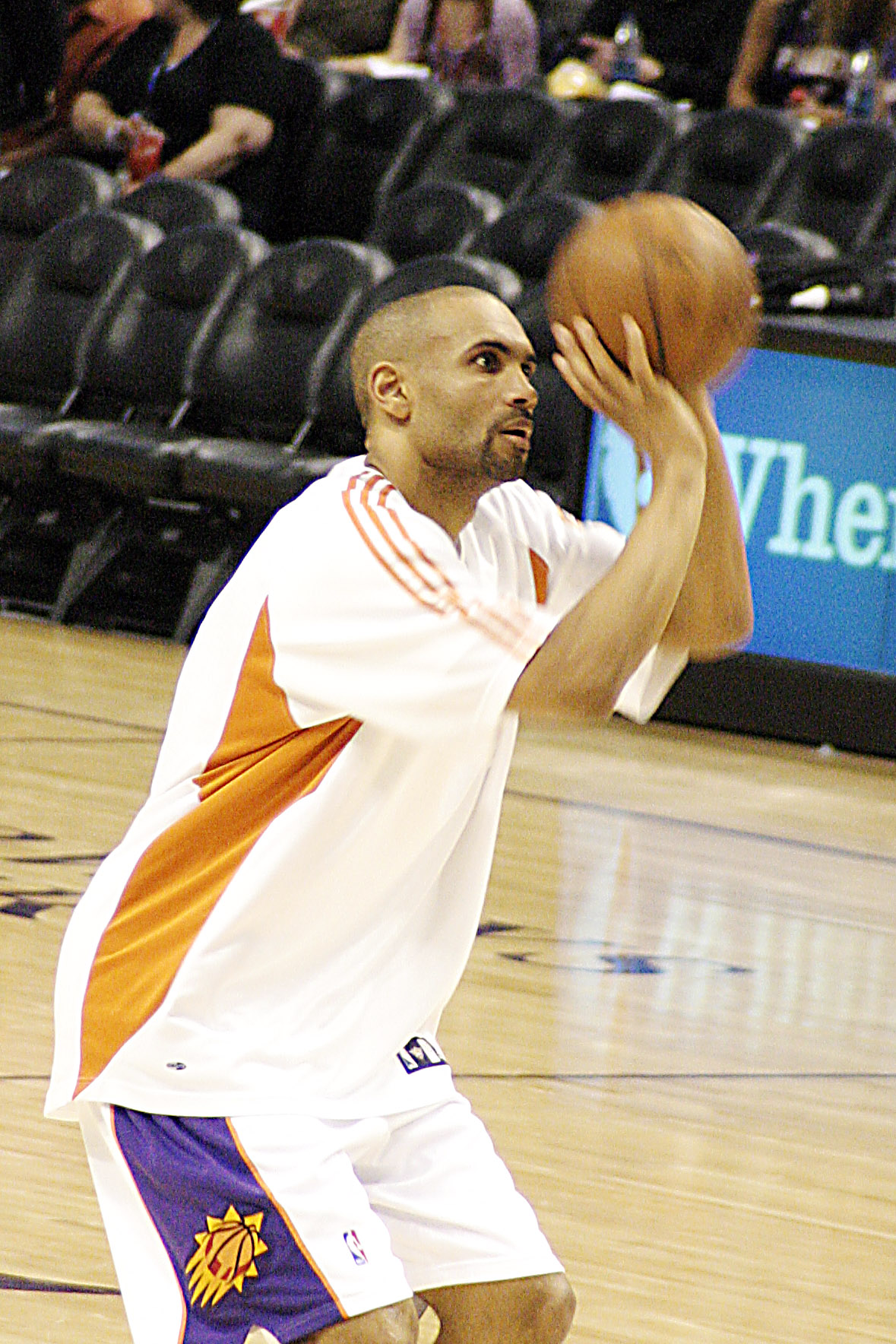
Grant Hill, three-time NBA Sportsmanship Award winner

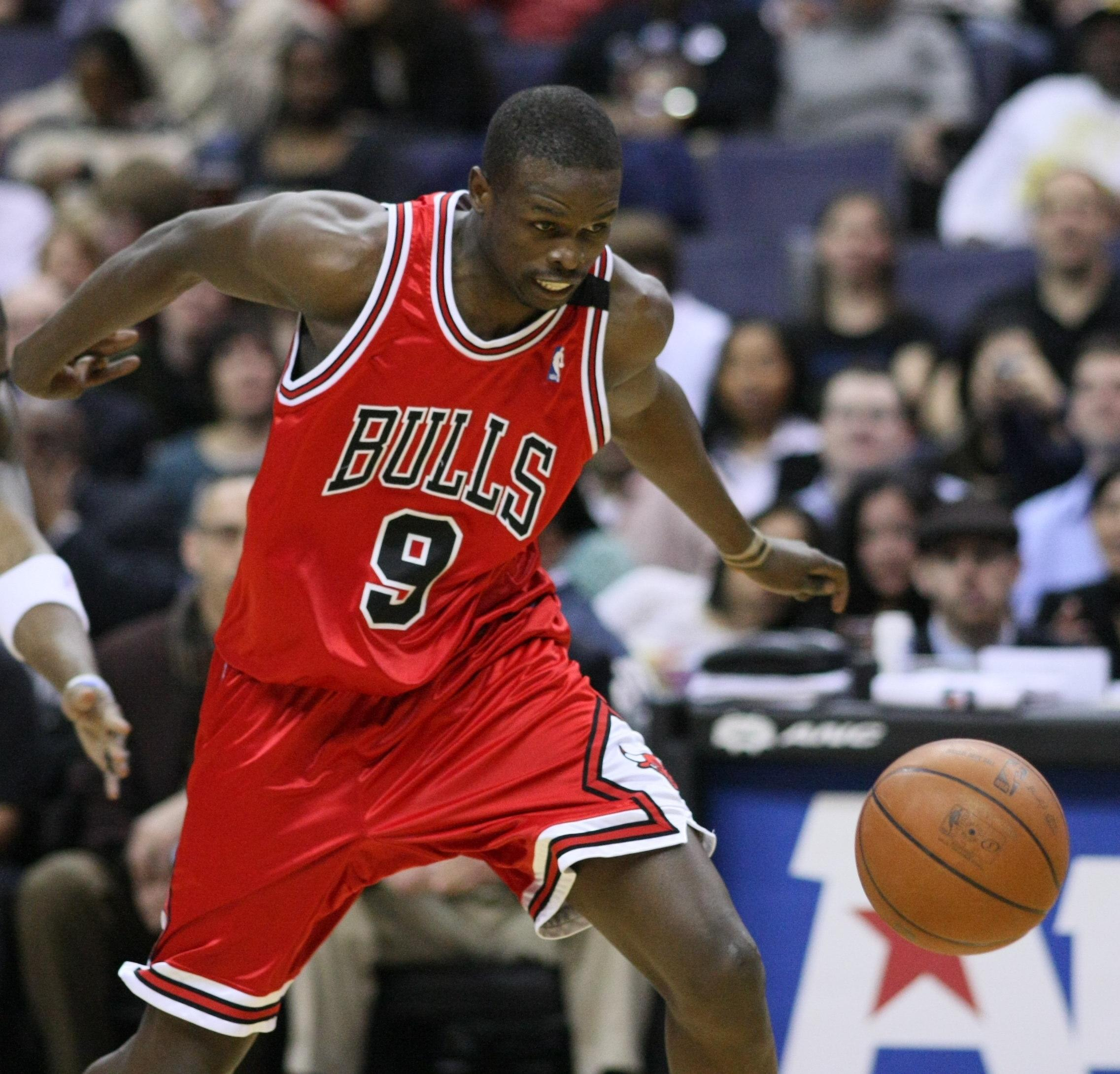
Luol Deng, one of only two foreign NBA players to win the award

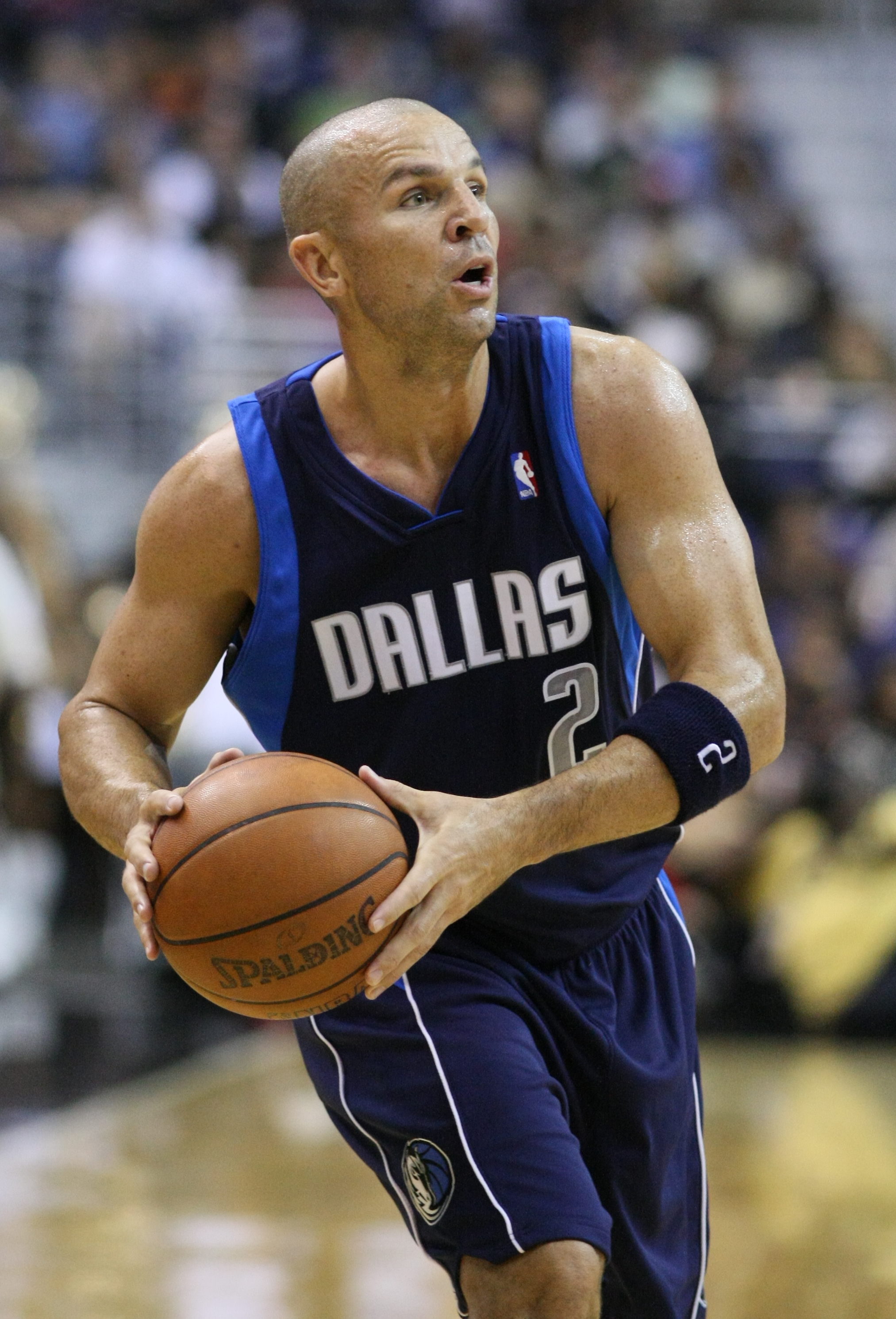
Jason Kidd won the award twice in consecutive years

^	Denotes player who is still active in the NBA
*	Elected to the Naismith Memorial Basketball Hall of Fame
†	Not yet eligible for Hall of Fame consideration (Note: A player is not eligible for induction into the Naismith Memorial Basketball Hall of Fame until he has been fully retired for two calendar years.)
Player (X)	Denotes the number of times the player has received the award

Season	Player	Position	Nationality	Team	References
1995–96	Joe Dumars*	Guard	United States	Detroit Pistons	
1996–97	Terrell Brandon	Guard	United States	Cleveland Cavaliers	
1997–98	Avery Johnson	Guard	United States	San Antonio Spurs	
1998–99	Hersey Hawkins	Guard	United States	Seattle SuperSonics	
1999–00	Eric Snow	Guard	United States	Philadelphia 76ers	
2000–01	David Robinson*	Center	United States	San Antonio Spurs (2)	
2001–02	Steve Smith	Guard	United States	San Antonio Spurs (3)	
2002–03	Ray Allen*	Guard	United States	Seattle SuperSonics (2)	
2003–04	P. J. Brown	Center/forward	United States	New Orleans Hornets	
2004–05	Grant Hill*	Forward	United States	Orlando Magic	
2005–06	Elton Brand	Forward	United States	Los Angeles Clippers	
2006–07	Luol Deng	Forward	United Kingdom (Note: Luol Deng was born in Wau, a city in Sudan (South Sudan since July 9, 2011), but became a naturalized British citizen in 2006.)	Chicago Bulls	
2007–08	Grant Hill* (2)	Forward	United States	Phoenix Suns	
2008–09	Chauncey Billups*	Guard	United States	Denver Nuggets	
2009–10	Grant Hill* (3)	Forward	United States	Phoenix Suns (2)	
2010–11	Stephen Curry^	Guard	United States	Golden State Warriors	
2011–12	Jason Kidd*	Guard	United States	Dallas Mavericks	
2012–13	Jason Kidd* (2)	Guard	United States	New York Knicks	
2013–14	Mike Conley^	Guard	United States	Memphis Grizzlies	
2014–15	Kyle Korver	Guard/forward	United States	Atlanta Hawks	
2015–16	Mike Conley^ (2)	Guard	United States	Memphis Grizzlies (2)	
2016–17	Kemba Walker^{†}	Guard	United States	Charlotte Hornets	
2017–18	Kemba Walker^{†} (2)	Guard	United States	Charlotte Hornets (2)	
2018–19	Mike Conley^ (3)	Guard	United States	Memphis Grizzlies (3)	
2019–20	Vince Carter*	Forward	United States	Atlanta Hawks (2)	
2020–21	Jrue Holiday^	Guard	United States	Milwaukee Bucks	
2021–22	Patty Mills^	Guard	Australia	Brooklyn Nets	
2022–23	Mike Conley^ (4)	Guard	United States	Minnesota Timberwolves	
2023–24	Tyrese Maxey^	Guard	United States	Philadelphia 76ers (2)	
2024–25	Jrue Holiday^ (2)	Guard	United States	Boston Celtics	
2025–26	Derrick White^	Guard	United States	Boston Celtics (2)	

== Multi-time winners ==
Awards	Player	Team	Years
4	(United States) Mike Conley	Memphis Grizzlies (3), Minnesota Timberwolves	2014, 2016, 2019, 2023
3	(United States) Grant Hill	Orlando Magic, Phoenix Suns (2)	2005, 2008, 2010
2	(United States) Jason Kidd	Dallas Mavericks, New York Knicks	2012, 2013
2	(United States) Kemba Walker	Charlotte Hornets	2017, 2018
2	(United States) Jrue Holiday	Milwaukee Bucks, Boston Celtics	2021, 2025

== Teams ==
Awards	Teams	Years
3	San Antonio Spurs	1998, 2001, 2002
3	Memphis Grizzlies	2014, 2016, 2019
2	Seattle SuperSonics	1999, 2003
2	Phoenix Suns	2008, 2010
2	Charlotte Hornets	2017, 2018
2	Atlanta Hawks	2015, 2020
2	Philadelphia 76ers	2000, 2024
2	Boston Celtics	2025, 2026
1	Orlando Magic	2005
1	New York Knicks	2013
1	New Orleans Pelicans / New Orleans Hornets	2004
1	Los Angeles Clippers	2006
1	Golden State Warriors	2011
1	Detroit Pistons	1996
1	Denver Nuggets	2009
1	Dallas Mavericks	2012
1	Cleveland Cavaliers	1997
1	Chicago Bulls	2007
1	Milwaukee Bucks	2021
1	Brooklyn Nets	2022
1	Minnesota Timberwolves	2023
0	Utah Jazz	None
0	Indiana Pacers	None
0	Sacramento Kings	None
0	Los Angeles Lakers	None
0	Toronto Raptors	None
0	Washington Wizards	None
0	Miami Heat	None
0	Portland Trail Blazers	None
0	Houston Rockets	None

== See also ==
- NBA records
