= Bryan Colangelo =

American basketball executive (born 1965)

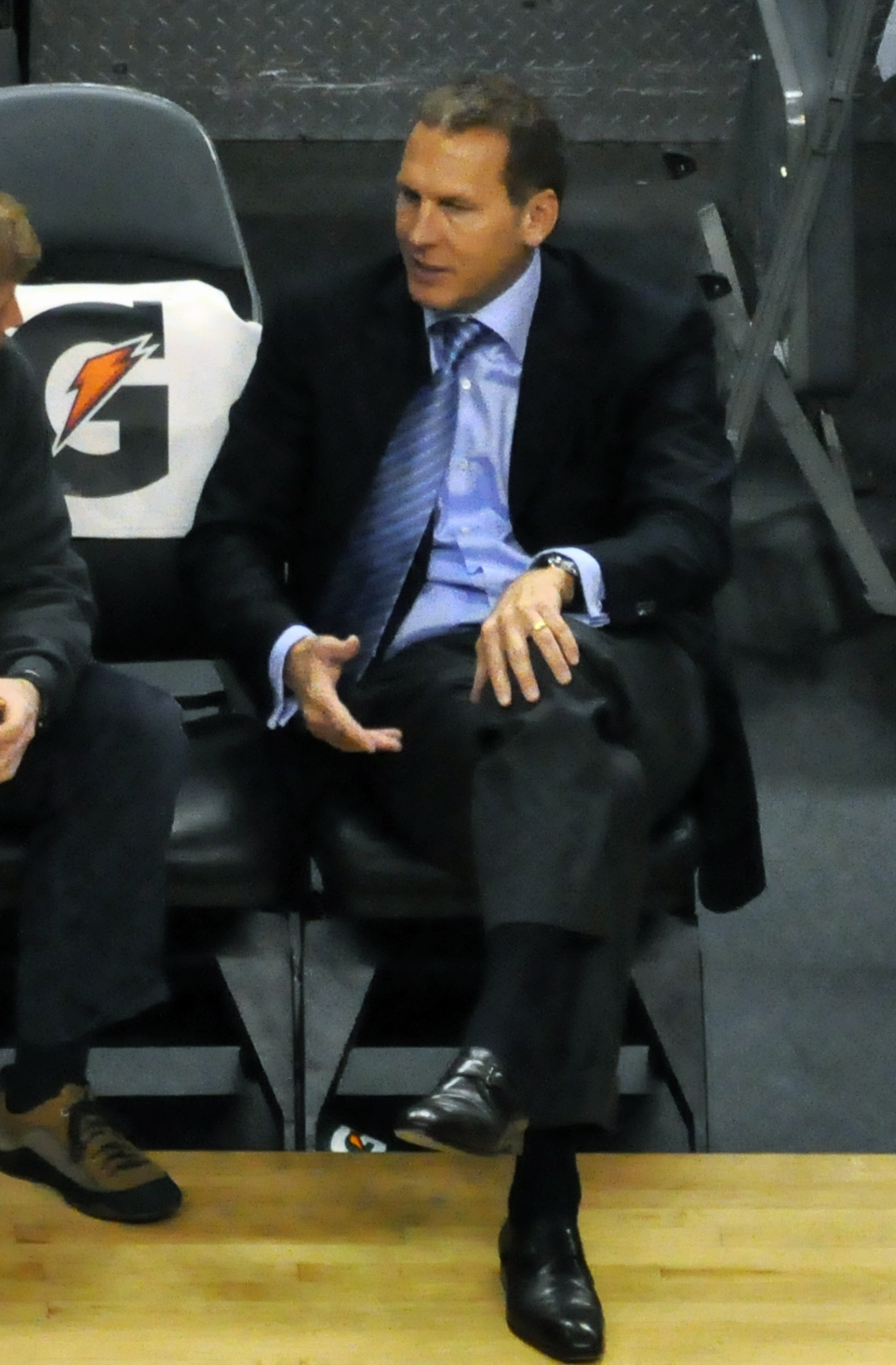
- Colangelo in 2009
- Born: June 1, 1965 (age 61); Chicago, Illinois, U.S.
- Education: Cornell University
- Spouse: Barbara Bottini
- Children: 2
- Parent(s): Jerry Colangelo (father); Joan Colangelo (mother)

Bryan Paul Colangelo (born June 1, 1965) is an American basketball executive who was the former general manager of the Philadelphia 76ers, Toronto Raptors and Phoenix Suns of the National Basketball Association (NBA). He also served as president of basketball operations for Philadelphia and Toronto. He is the son of Phoenix sports mogul Jerry Colangelo. He graduated from Cornell University with a Bachelor of Science degree in business management and applied economics. He was the 2005 and 2007 recipient of the NBA Executive of the Year Award.

== Early life ==
Colangelo grew up in Phoenix, Arizona, where his father served as general manager (and eventually owner) of the Phoenix Suns. After graduating from Central High School, Colangelo attended Cornell University, where he played as a guard for the Cornell Big Red men's basketball team. After graduating from Cornell, he moved to New York City, where he worked in real estate.

== Front office career ==
=== Phoenix Suns ===
Colangelo was hired by the Suns front office in 1991. In 1995, Colangelo succeeded his father as general manager of the Suns.

Colangelo drafted would-be superstars Shawn Marion and Amar'e Stoudemire and traded Jason Kidd to the New Jersey Nets for Stephon Marbury, and then traded Marbury and oft-injured Penny Hardaway to the New York Knicks for several contracts. The additional salary cap space created by this trade allowed Colangelo to sign Steve Nash back from the Dallas Mavericks in the summer of 2004. Nash would go on to be the 2004–05 and 2005–06 NBA Most Valuable Player, and the Suns would go 62–20 and claim the top playoff seed in the Western Conference in the 2004–05 season. As a result, Colangelo was awarded the 2005 NBA Executive of the Year Award.

In the summer of 2005, Colangelo traded shooting guard Joe Johnson to the Atlanta Hawks for two future first-round picks and Boris Diaw, who then won the 2006 NBA Most Improved Player Award. Colangelo also dealt Quentin Richardson to the Knicks. After the loss of these two players and the loss of Stoudemire for virtually the entire season (only playing in 3 regular season games), the Suns once again led the Pacific Division.

In addition to his work with the Suns, he served as president of Phoenix Arena Sports (PAS), the owning entity of the Arizona Rattlers team of the Arena Football League and the operating entity of the Phoenix Mercury team of WNBA from June 1991 through June 2002. The Rattlers won the championship in 1994 and 1997 and the Mercury played in the WNBA finals in 1998. He won the AFL Executive of the Year award in 1993 for his work with the Rattlers.

=== Toronto Raptors ===
On February 27, 2006, Colangelo resigned from his position with the Suns, and on February 28, 2006, the Raptors announced him as their new president and general manager. On May 23, 2006, Colangelo and the Raptors were awarded the first overall pick in the 2006 NBA draft.

On June 8, 2006, Colangelo pulled his first trade since he joined the Raptors by swapping first-rounder Rafael Araújo for Robert Whaley and Kris Humphries with the Utah Jazz. He completed his second trade by sending forward Eric Williams, fan favorite Matt Bonner and a 2009 second-round pick to the San Antonio Spurs for center Radoslav Nesterovič on June 21, 2006. The Raptors also announced that they had waived Whaley.

Colangelo traded Charlie Villanueva, who was runner-up for the NBA Rookie of the Year Award, for Milwaukee Bucks point guard T. J. Ford.

Colangelo picked the 20-year-old Italian Andrea Bargnani with the first overall selection in the 2006 NBA Draft which was held in New York City on June 28, 2006. This also made Bargnani the first European selected first overall in the history of the NBA draft. He also signed several free agents from European teams, including Jorge Garbajosa and Anthony Parker. However, the drafting of Bargnani would cause some serious criticism later on after performing lesser to expectations as a #1 selection.

On July 16, 2006, Colangelo signed Bosh to a contract extension which was in effect starting from the 2007–08 season. The contract was for three years plus a player option for the fourth year, and had the potential to pay Bosh up to US$65 million over the four-year span.

==== 2007: Executive of the Year ====
In 2007 the Raptors clinched the Atlantic Division, with a 47–35 record, for the first time in franchise history. Many have credited their significant turnaround from a 27–55 in the 2005–06 season to the changes made by Colangelo, in which he brought in nine new players to the Toronto Raptors' roster.

Colangelo was awarded the 2007 Executive of the Year Award in the weeks following the Raptors' series loss to the Nets in the first round of the playoffs.

During the offseason, Colangelo gave the 2009 and 2011 second-round draft picks to the Detroit Pistons in exchange for Carlos Delfino. He also signed Jason Kapono to a multi-year contract with the Raptors.

==== 2008–2013 ====
On July 6, 2008, Colangelo traded point guard T. J. Ford to the Indiana Pacers for Jermaine O'Neal. In the trade the Raptors also acquired the draft rights to forward-center Nathan Jawai, the 41st overall selection in the 2008 NBA draft, and sent center Rasho Nesterovic, forward Maceo Baston and the draft rights to the 17th overall selection, center Roy Hibbert, to Indiana. During the 2008–2009 season, the trade was regarded as being a failure for Toronto.

Colangelo fired coach Sam Mitchell 17 games into the season, promoting assistant Jay Triano to head coach. Triano was the first Canadian-born head coach in NBA history.

In the 2009 draft he picked DeMar DeRozan with the ninth pick. Two years later, in the 2011 draft he picked Jonas Valančiūnas with the fifth pick, although he would not play for the Raptors until 2012.

In July 2012, Colangelo traded Gary Forbes and a first-round pick for Kyle Lowry. In October 2012 he re-signed DeMar DeRozan to a 4-year deal worth $38 million.

On May 21, 2013, MLSE announced that the Raptors were looking for a new general manager, but Colangelo would remain team president. On June 26, 2013, Colangelo stepped down as president of the Raptors. Although Colangelo had received substantial criticism in the latter part of his tenure as Raptors' general manager, he was credited with building the foundations for the Raptors' success under his replacement, Masai Ujiri.

After his tenure with the Toronto Raptors ended, Colangelo did freelance scouting and consulting for other NBA executives and agents. In January 2016, Colangelo emerged as a top candidate to succeed Billy King as general manager of the Brooklyn Nets, though the team ultimately hired the San Antonio Spurs' assistant general manager Sean Marks instead despite not being considered a main competitor for the position at the time.

=== Philadelphia 76ers ===
In April 2016, the Philadelphia 76ers hired Colangelo as president of basketball operations. Colangelo's father, Jerry Colangelo, hired his son yet again. The older Colangelo still maintained a role as a special adviser for the team during this period. Sam Hinkie, the previous general manager of the team, stepped down from his position days before Bryan Colangelo was hired.

Colangelo drafted Ben Simmons, a former LSU point forward, as the first overall pick of the 2016 NBA draft; the team also selected Timothé Luwawu-Cabarrot and Furkan Korkmaz with first-round picks. Due to a fractured foot, Simmons missed the entirety of the 2016–17 season. Colangelo also signed Jerryd Bayless, Gerald Henderson, and Sergio Rodriguez during the 2016 off-season. At the 2017 trade deadline, Colangelo traded center Nerlens Noel to the Dallas Mavericks for Andrew Bogut, Justin Anderson, and two second round picks. In June 2017, Colangelo traded the third pick in the 2017 NBA draft and a future first-round pick to the Boston Celtics for the first overall pick of the draft, using that pick to select Markelle Fultz. During this second and final season, Colangelo helped the 76ers enter the playoffs with over 50 victories, as well as enter the second round of the playoffs that year.

On May 29, 2018, The Ringer published an investigation alleging Colangelo used up to five secret Twitter accounts to disparage his predecessor, Hinkie, as well as several 76ers players including Joel Embiid and Jahlil Okafor. The next day, the 76ers announced that they were commencing an investigation into the matter. Colangelo denied the report in a statement. On June 7, 2018, Colangelo resigned as a result of the Twitter scandal. The situation related to his wife, Barbara Bottini, creating three of the five fake Twitter accounts involved that leaked potentially sensitive information about the Philadelphia 76ers organization, among other details. Colangelo also had an account, but he never released sensitive information from it. The 76ers' head coach Brett Brown was named interim general manager at the time, holding onto the position from June 7 to September 20. On that day, former 76ers player Elton Brand was named the official general manager of the team.

== Personal life ==
Before working for the Phoenix Suns, Colangelo worked for an upmarket commercial real estate firm on Wall Street for four years.

Colangelo is married to Italian-born Barbara Bottini, and they have two children.

In 2015, Colangelo was in the final stages of earning his permanent residency in Canada.
