= Jon Horst =

American basketball manager (born 1983)

Milwaukee Bucks
- Position: General manager
- League: NBA

Personal information
- Born: April 16, 1983 (age 42) Sandusky, Michigan, U.S.

Career information
- High school: Sandusky (Sandusky, Michigan)
- College: Rochester (MI) (2003–2006)
- NBA draft: 2006: undrafted

Career highlights
- As player: 2× USCAA national champion (2004, 2005); As executive: NBA champion (2021); NBA Executive of the Year (2019)

Jonathan Randall Horst (born April 16, 1983) is an American basketball general manager (GM) for the Milwaukee Bucks of the National Basketball Association (NBA), appointed on June 16, 2017, and named NBA Executive of the Year on June 24, 2019.

While he was a player on the Rochester College basketball team, Horst won back-to-back United States Collegiate Athletic Association national championships in 2004 and 2005.

== Executive career ==
Horst held the position of Director of Basketball Operations for the Milwaukee Bucks from April 2008 to June 2017, and from August 2007 to April 2008 he was the Manager of Basketball Operations for the Detroit Pistons.

Horst became the general manager of the Milwaukee Bucks in June 2017. He took over from John Hammond, who joined the Orlando Magic. After the 2018–19 NBA season, Horst won the 2019 NBA Executive of the Year award. The Bucks had a league-best 60–22 record and reached the Eastern Conference finals in the 2019 NBA playoffs. On June 7, 2019, Horst signed a contract extension with the Milwaukee Bucks. On July 20, 2021, Horst's Bucks became NBA champions after defeating the Phoenix Suns in the 2021 NBA Finals. On April 24, 2025, Horst and the Bucks agreed to a multi-year contract extension.
