= Larry Harris (basketball) =

American basketball player (born 1963)

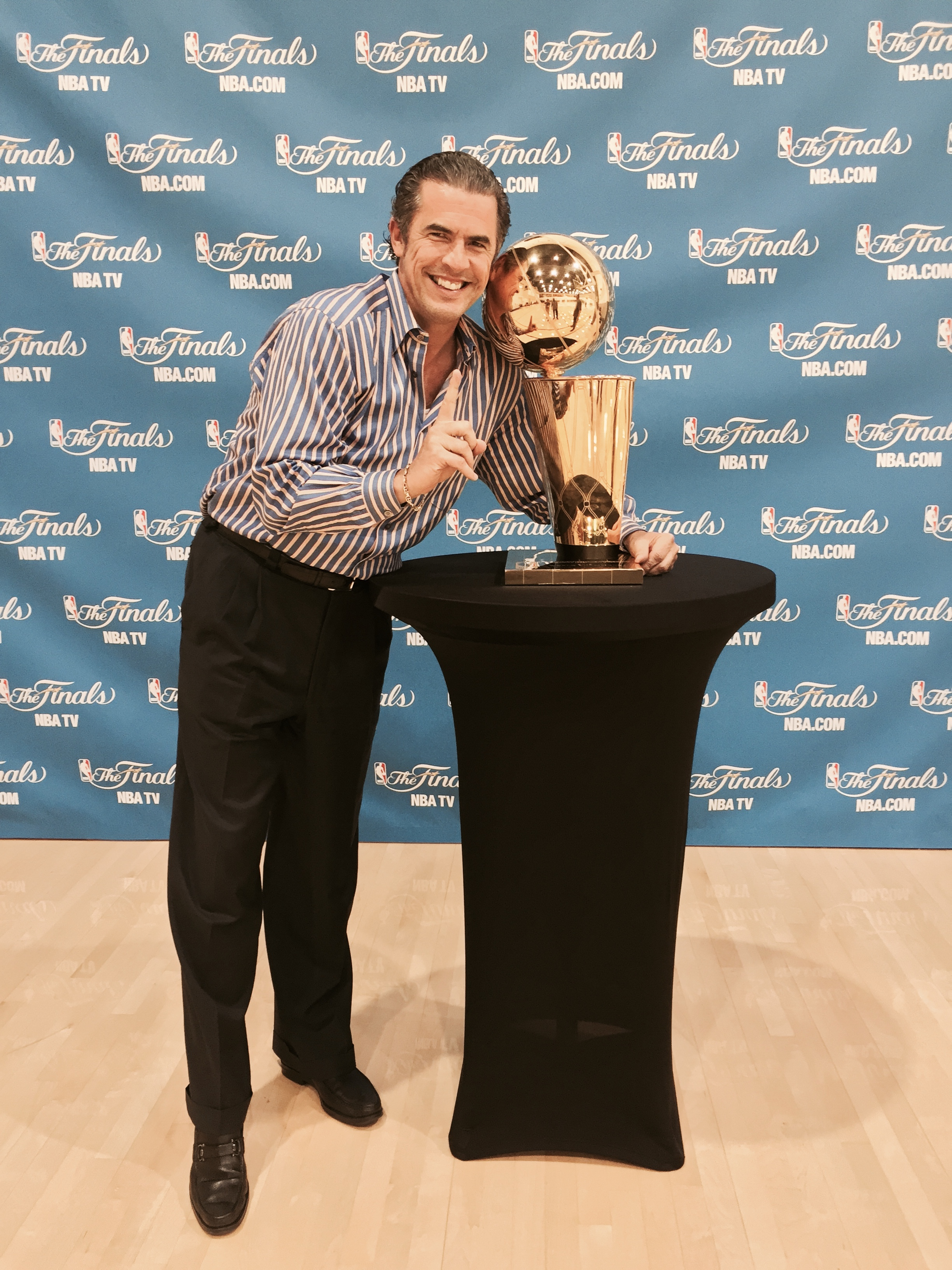
- Harris with the Larry O'Brien Championship Trophy

Golden State Warriors
- Positions: Assistant general manager & director of player personnel

Personal information
- Born: 1963 (age 62–63)

Career information
- College: Eastern New Mexico (1981–1985)
- Coaching career: 1987–present

Larry D. Harris (born 1963) served as the general manager of the Milwaukee Bucks from 2003 until March 19, 2008. He currently serves as the assistant general manager and director of player personnel for the Golden State Warriors.

== Personal life ==
Harris's father is former National Basketball Association (NBA) coach Del Harris. Larry Harris graduated from Eastern New Mexico University in 1985 with a degree in mathematics and was not a four-year starter on the Eastern New Mexico Greyhounds men's basketball team. As a senior, Harris was team captain. Harris and his wife, Gail, have five children between them: Zachary, Garrett, Janaya, Brooke, and Addison.

== Career ==
From 1987 to 1991, Harris was video coordinator and scout for the Milwaukee Bucks and only a scout from 1991 to 1996. Harris moved up to director of scouting, a position he would serve from 1996 to 1998, then was director of player personnel from 1998 to 2001 and assistant general manager from 2001 to 2003.

Bucks owner Herb Kohl appointed Harris to succeed departing GM Ernie Grunfeld in 2003. Harris' most notable moves included the drafting of Australian center Andrew Bogut with the first pick in the 2005 NBA draft, re-signing star guard Michael Redd, and drafting Chinese basketball star Yi Jianlian with the 2007 NBA draft's 6th overall pick, despite attempts by Yi's handlers to prevent such a scenario.

Harris was an assistant coach for the Golden State Warriors during the 2008–09 season. Harris later became a scout and advisor the next season. In 2015, Harris was named director of player personnel and then added assistant general manager to his title in 2016.

== Milwaukee Bucks ==
=== Notable trades ===
- January 11, 2007 – Traded guard Steve Blake to the Denver Nuggets for guard Earl Boykins and forward Julius Hodge.
- August 10, 2006 – Traded forward Joe Smith to the Denver Nuggets for forward Ruben Patterson.
- July 31, 2006 – Traded center Jamaal Magloire to the Portland Trail Blazers for guard Steve Blake, center Ha Seung-Jin, and forward Brian Skinner.
- June 30, 2006 – Traded starting point guard T. J. Ford and cash to the Toronto Raptors for second-year forward Charlie Villanueva.
- October 26, 2005 – Traded forward Desmond Mason, a 2006 first-round pick, and cash to the New Orleans Hornets for center Jamaal Magloire.
- February 24, 2005 – Traded forward Keith Van Horn to the Dallas Mavericks for forward Alan Henderson, center Calvin Booth and cash; traded guard Mike James and center Zendon Hamilton to the Houston Rockets for guard Reece Gaines and second-round picks in 2006 and 2007.
- February 15, 2004 – In a three-way trade, acquired Keith Van Horn from the New York Knicks while sending Tim Thomas to the Knicks and center Joel Przybilla to the Atlanta Hawks.

=== Notable signings ===
- September 20, 2007 – Re-signed guard Charlie Bell to a five-year, $18.5 million contract, by matching the Miami Heat's offer sheet.
- July 24, 2007 – Re-signed guard Maurice Williams to a six-year, $52 million contract, by matching the Miami Heat's offer sheet.
- August 13, 2005 – Re-signed guard Michael Redd to the maximum contract permitted, for six years and $91 million.
- August 12, 2005 – Re-signed center Dan Gadzuric to a six-year $36 million contract.
- August 8, 2005 – Signed 2004–05 NBA most improved player Bobby Simmons, formerly of the Los Angeles Clippers, to a five-year $47 million contract.
- August 21, 2004 – Signed guard Maurice Williams, formerly of the Utah Jazz.
