= Milwaukee Bucks =

National Basketball Association team in Milwaukee, Wisconsin

- 2026–27 Milwaukee Bucks season
- Conference: Eastern
- Division: Central
- Founded: 1968
- History: Milwaukee Bucks; 1968–present
- Arena: Fiserv Forum
- Location: Milwaukee, Wisconsin
- Team colors: Good Land green, Cream City cream, Great Lakes blue, black, white
- Main sponsor: Motorola Mobility
- President: Josh Glessing
- General manager: Jon Horst
- Head coach: Taylor Jenkins
- Ownership: Wes Edens, Jimmy Haslam, Jamie Dinan, Mike Fascitelli
- Affiliation: Wisconsin Herd
- Championships: 2 (1971, 2021)
- Conference titles: 3 (1971, 1974, 2021)
- Division titles: 19 (1971, 1972, 1973, 1974, 1976, 1980, 1981, 1982, 1983, 1984, 1985, 1986, 2001, 2019, 2020, 2021, 2022, 2023, 2024)
- NBA Cup titles: 1 (2024)
- Retired numbers: 9 (1, 2, 4, 8, 10, 14, 16, 32, 33)
- Website: nba.com/bucks
Association	Icon	Statement

The Milwaukee Bucks are an American professional basketball team based in Milwaukee. The Bucks compete in the National Basketball Association (NBA) as a member of the Central Division of the Eastern Conference. The team was founded in 1968 as an expansion team, and play home games at Fiserv Forum. Former U.S. senator Herb Kohl was the long-time owner of the team, but on April 16, 2014, a group led by billionaire hedge fund managers Wes Edens and Marc Lasry agreed to purchase a majority interest in the team from Kohl, a sale which was approved by the owners of the NBA and its Board of Governors one month later on May 16. The team is managed by Jon Horst, the team's former director of basketball operations, who took over for John Hammond.

The Bucks have won two league championships (1971, 2021), three conference titles (Western: 1971, 1974, Eastern: 2021), 19 division titles (1971–1974, 1976, 1980–1986, 2001, 2019–2024), and the 2024 NBA Cup. They have featured such notable players as Kareem Abdul-Jabbar, Oscar Robertson, Bob Dandridge, Sidney Moncrief, Bob Lanier, Terry Cummings, Glenn Robinson, Ray Allen, Michael Redd, Giannis Antetokounmpo, Khris Middleton, Jrue Holiday, and Damian Lillard among others. Abdul-Jabbar and Antetokounmpo have been named the NBA's Most Valuable Player while playing for the Bucks, for a total of five MVP awards. They both are also the only players to win Finals MVP for the franchise. The Bucks are the only NBA team to have won a championship in both the Eastern and Western Conference.

== History ==
=== 1968–1969: Team creation ===
On January 22, 1968, the NBA awarded a franchise to Milwaukee Professional Sports and Services, Inc. (Milwaukee Pro), a group headed by Wesley Pavalon and Marvin Fishman. This announcement would come nearly a year after Milwaukee would almost acquire a team from the newly created and rivaling American Basketball Association before the start of its inaugural season. A fan contest was held to name the new team, with over 40,000 fans participating. While the most-voted fan entry was the Robins, named for Wisconsin's state bird, the contest judges went with the second-most popular choice, the Bucks, which was a reference to Wisconsin's official wild animal, the white-tailed deer. One fan, R. D. Trebilcox, was awarded a new car for his part in reasoning why the Bucks was a good nickname, saying that bucks were "spirited, good jumpers, fast and agile." The Bucks marked a return of the NBA to Milwaukee after 13 years; their previous team, the Hawks, played for four seasons in the early 1950s before moving to St. Louis in 1955 (they are now based in Atlanta). In October, the Bucks played their first NBA regular-season game against the Chicago Bulls before a Milwaukee Arena crowd of 8,467. As is typical with expansion teams, the Bucks' first season (1968–69) was a struggle. Their first victory came in their sixth game as the Bucks beat the Detroit Pistons 134–118; they won only 26 more games in their first year. That year, the Bucks' record earned them a coin flip against their expansion cousins, the Phoenix Suns, to see who would get the first pick in the upcoming draft. It was considered a foregone conclusion that the first pick in the draft would be Lew Alcindor of UCLA. The Bucks won the coin flip, but had to win a bidding war with the New York Nets of the upstart American Basketball Association (ABA) to secure him.

=== 1969–1975: The Kareem Abdul-Jabbar era ===
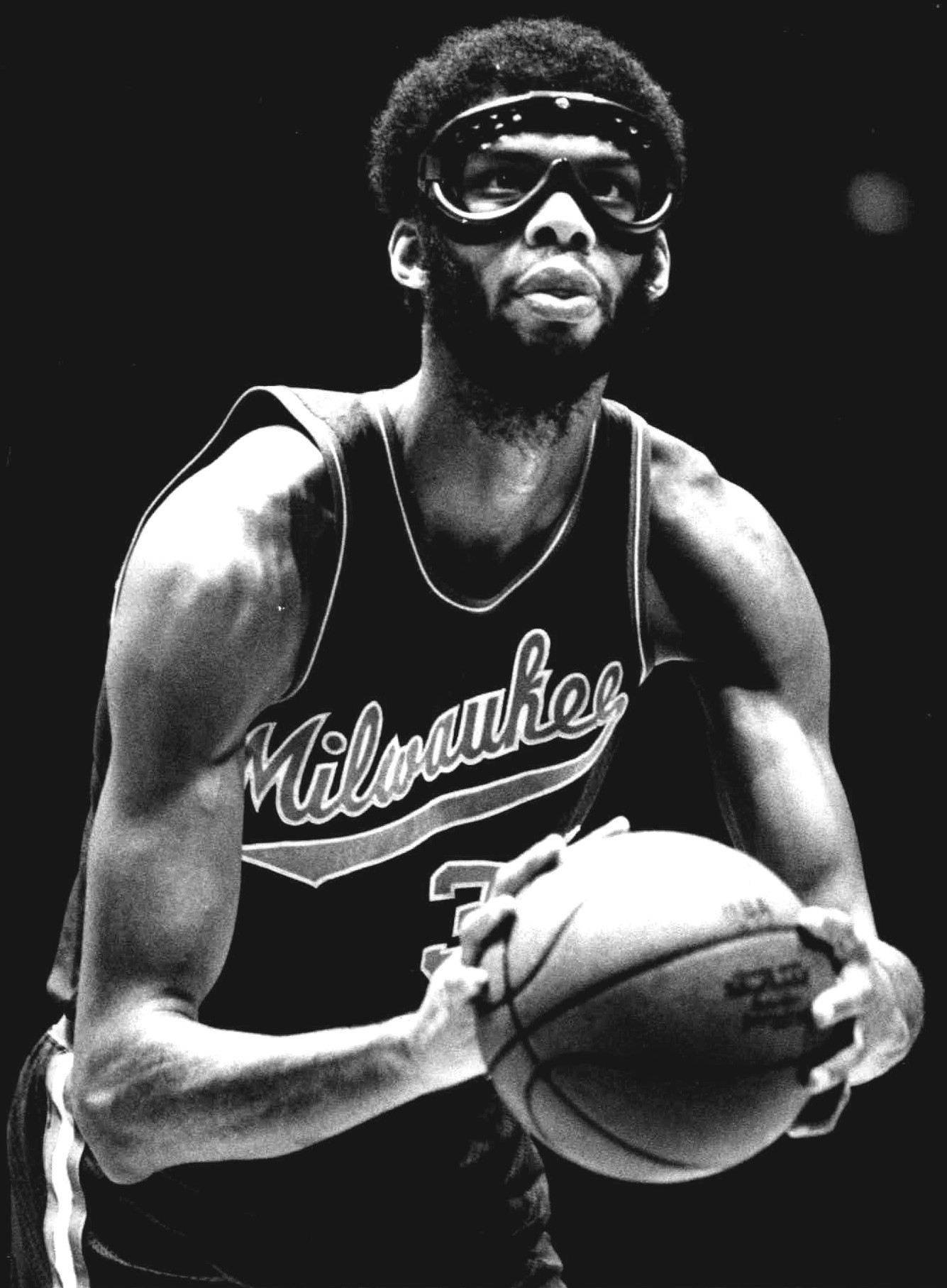
During his six seasons with the Bucks, Kareem Abdul-Jabbar averaged 30.4 points and 15.3 rebounds per game.

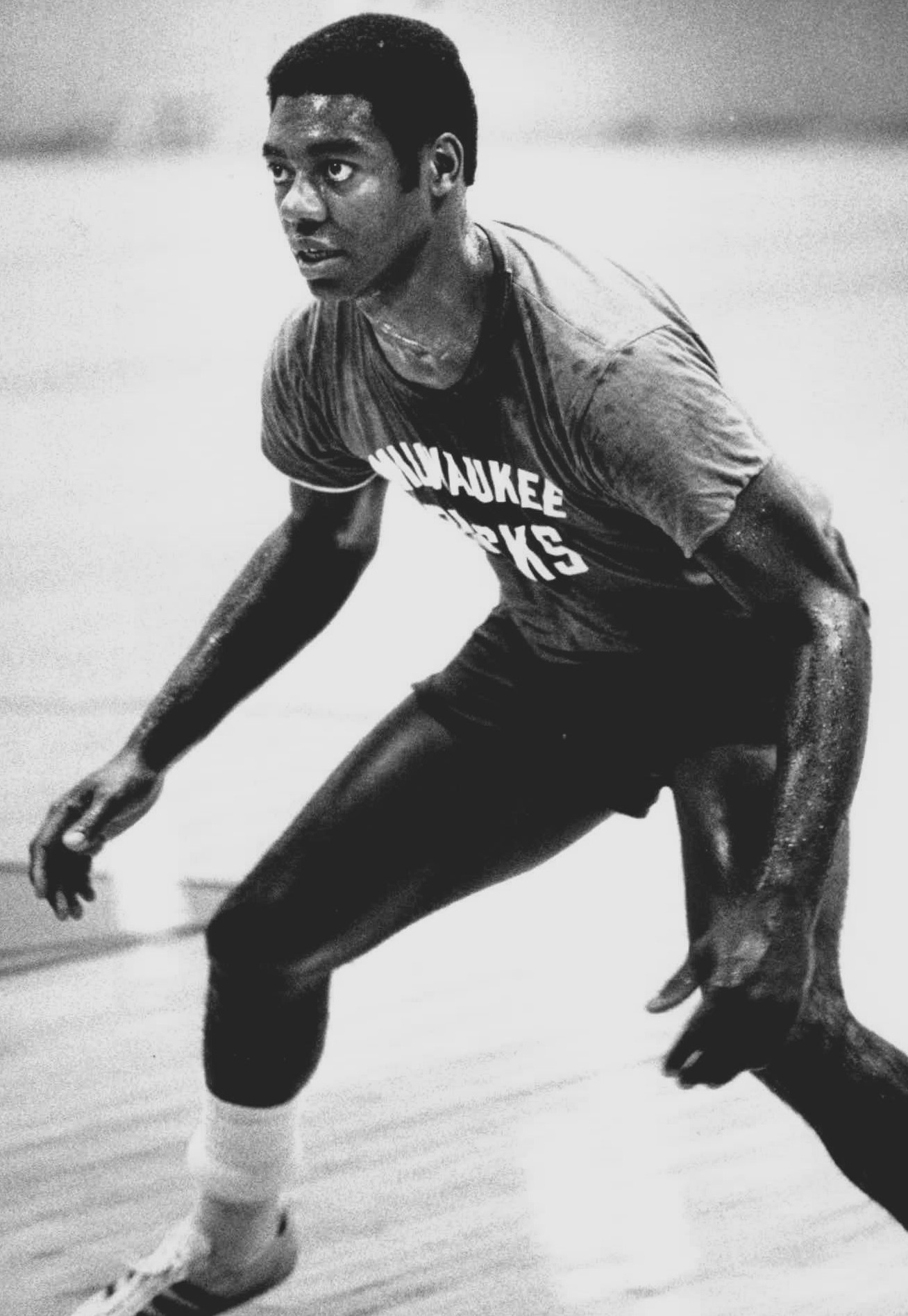
Oscar Robertson was a key member of the Championship-winning 1970–71 Milwaukee Bucks

With the addition of Alcindor, the Bucks finished with a 56–26 record in 1969–70, second-best in the league behind the New York Knicks. Not only was this a near-reversal of their inaugural season, but the 29-game improvement was the best in league history – a record which would stand for ten years until the Boston Celtics jumped from 29 wins in 1978–79 to 61 in 1979–80. The Bucks defeated the Philadelphia 76ers in five games in the Eastern Conference semifinals, only to be dispatched in five by the Knicks in the Eastern finals. Alcindor was a runaway selection for NBA Rookie of the Year.

The following season, the Bucks traded for Cincinnati Royals guard Oscar Robertson to complement Alcindor. Subsequently, the Bucks, now in the Western Conference, finished 66–16, the second-most wins in NBA history at the time, and still a franchise record. During the regular season, the Bucks recorded a then-NBA record 20-game win streak. Posting a 12–2 record in the playoffs, they won their first NBA championship on April 30, 1971, by sweeping the Baltimore Bullets in four games. By winning the championship in only their third season, the Bucks became one of the fastest true expansion teams in North American professional sports history to win a league championship.

The Bucks remained a powerhouse for the first half of the 1970s. In 1972, Alcindor, who had already privately converted to Islam and changed his name, publicly announced his name change to Kareem Abdul-Jabbar. The Bucks reached the division/conference finals for the third year in a row, but lost to the Los Angeles Lakers in six games. In 1973, they recorded their third consecutive 60-win season, the first NBA team to do so, but injuries resulted in an early playoff exit. The Bucks were back in the 1974 NBA Finals against the Celtics. In game six of the series, Abdul-Jabbar made his famous "sky hook" shot in a classic double-overtime victory. However, the Bucks then lost in game seven, and did not return to the NBA Finals until 2021.

As the 1974–1975 season began, Abdul-Jabbar suffered a hand injury and the Bucks got off to a 3–13 start. After his return, other injuries befell the team, sending them to the bottom of their division with a 38–44 record. When the season ended, Abdul-Jabbar announced that he no longer wished to play for the Bucks and wanted to play in a larger market, either Los Angeles or New York. After the front office was unable to convince him to stay, the Bucks obliged Abdul-Jabbar's request by trading him to the Lakers on June 16, 1975, for Elmore Smith, Junior Bridgeman, Brian Winters, and David Meyers. The trade triggered a series of events that led to a change in the team's ownership. Minority owner and cable television executive Jim Fitzgerald opposed the trade and wanted to sell his stock.

=== 1976–1979: Post-Abdul-Jabbar era; "Green 'n Growing" ===
After the deal, the Bucks had several seasons in transition, but most of these players would go on to help the team. After being sold to Fitzgerald and several partners in 1976, the Bucks would enter into another era of greatness. It began with Don Nelson who became head coach in November 1976 after Larry Costello abruptly resigned. In the 1977 draft, the Bucks had three first-round picks and drafted Kent Benson, Marques Johnson and Ernie Grunfeld. Johnson would become a staple in the Bucks for years to come. Rookie Sidney Moncrief made his debut in 1979. Don Nelson went on to win two NBA Coach of the Year awards with the Bucks, both during seasons where the team won division titles, in 1983 and 1985.

On October 18, 1977, Abdul-Jabbar, playing with the Lakers, punched Benson during a game. Abdul-Jabbar broke his hand in the process. Benson had been aggressive under the boards and Abdul-Jabbar, a martial arts blackbelt, snapped. Abdul-Jabbar was fined $5,000 by the NBA and missed the next 20 games. Meanwhile, Benson never played as aggressively again and the Bucks traded him to the Detroit Pistons in 1980 for veteran center Bob Lanier to fill in the hole left by the departure of Abdul-Jabbar. They then won the Midwest Division title in 1980. After losing to Seattle in the semi-finals, the Bucks moved to the Eastern Conference's Central Division.

=== 1979–1990: The Sidney Moncrief era ===
There, they would win six straight division titles and have .500 seasons for the next 11 years. Within those years, the Bucks became perennial Eastern Conference contenders, primarily due to the strong play of Moncrief, Marques Johnson, Paul Pressey, Junior Bridgeman and the arrival of Craig Hodges, Terry Cummings, Ricky Pierce and Jack Sikma from trades with the Los Angeles Clippers and Seattle SuperSonics respectively. However, the Bucks were unable to make it to the NBA Finals again, being eliminated by either the Celtics or the Sixers each time.

For much of the 1970s, the Bucks' colors were forest green, deep red and white. In 1978, they added various shades of green to the uniforms, and in 1985, they eliminated red from the team colors.

Noteworthy for the 1980s Bucks is that in 1983 they became the first, and until 2003, only team in NBA history to sweep the Boston Celtics in a best-of-seven playoff series, being the first team to meet and defeat Michael Jordan in a playoff series (during Jordan's rookie year), and hosting Julius Erving's final NBA game in the 1987 NBA playoffs, which would see the Bucks advancing with a game five first-round playoff victory.

==== Ownership and arena changes ====
In 1985, Fitzgerald and his partners (one of which was Stuart Shadel) decided to sell the Bucks. Fitzgerald was having health problems and some of his investors wanted to get out, and he was reeling from the failure of Sportsvue, a pioneering regional sports network–a failure that came in part because Milwaukee itself was not wired for cable. By then, Milwaukee Arena was the smallest arena in the NBA, and the city did not want to build a new one. Milwaukee businessman and future U.S. Senator Herb Kohl bought the Bucks after fears that out-of-town investors could buy the team and move it out of Milwaukee. Before the transaction was complete, broadcaster Lloyd Pettit and his wife, Jane Bradley Pettit, announced they were donating a new arena called the Bradley Center. In 2003, after considering selling the team, Kohl announced that he had decided against selling the Bucks to Michael Jordan and would "continue to own them, improve them and commit them to remaining in Wisconsin".

On May 21, 2012, the naming rights of the Bradley Center were sold to BMO Harris Bank, a division of Bank of Montreal. BMO Harris had merged with Milwaukee-based M&I Bank a year earlier. After the heirs to the Bradley fortune gave their approval, the arena was renamed the "BMO Harris Bradley Center".

=== 1990–1998: The period of struggles ===
For most of the 1990s, the Bucks franchise was mired in mediocrity under coaches Frank Hamblen, Mike Dunleavy, and Chris Ford. They would make the playoffs only three times during the 1990s, winning only one playoff game. From 1991 through 1998, the Bucks suffered a franchise-record seven straight losing seasons. During this period, the Bucks drafted Glenn Robinson with the first overall pick in the 1994 NBA Draft and in 1996 acquired rookie Ray Allen in a draft-day trade with the Minnesota Timberwolves. Both players would have prominent roles in the Bucks' resurgence during the late 1990s. At the 1998 NBA draft, the Bucks made a trade that would come back to haunt them for years. At the draft, the Bucks selected Dirk Nowitzki with the ninth overall pick, but traded him to the Dallas Mavericks in exchange for Robert Traylor. Many rank this as one of the most lopsided trades in NBA history, as Nowitzki would go onto a 21-season career with the Mavericks, winning a championship in 2011 while being named Finals MVP in the process, along with winning the NBA MVP award in 2007. Meanwhile, Traylor would spend just two seasons with the Bucks before joining the Cleveland Cavaliers.

After the franchise's 25th anniversary in 1993, the Bucks overhauled their logo and uniforms. The colors were green, purple, and silver. The old logo, which featured a cartoonish deer, was replaced in favor of a more realistic one. The primary color scheme was altered as well, when red was supplanted by purple. Purple road uniforms replaced the former green away uniforms.

In 1997, the Bucks sent all-star forward Vin Baker in a three-team trade to the Seattle SuperSonics, and they would acquire Cleveland Cavaliers guard Terrell Brandon and forward Tyrone Hill. They also traded their 10th overall pick Danny Fortson, guard Johnny Newman, and center Joe Wolf to the Denver Nuggets for center Ervin Johnson. The 1997–98 Bucks finished their season with a 36–46 record, failing to make the playoffs for the seventh consecutive time.

=== 1998–2003: The Big Three era; "Light It Up" ===
After a decade of dwelling near the bottom of the NBA's standings, the Bucks looked to add credibility to their basketball operations. In 1998, the team hired veteran coach George Karl, who had reached the NBA Finals with the Seattle SuperSonics. Under the leadership of Karl and general manager Ernie Grunfeld, and with the steady addition of talent such as Tim Thomas, Toni Kukoč and Sam Cassell, the Bucks developed into an elite team in the Eastern Conference. The nucleus of the "big three"—consisting of Ray Allen, Cassell, and Robinson—along with Karl, created a successful renaissance era in Milwaukee. The team reached its zenith in 2000–2001, winning 52 games and their first division title in 15 years. The Bucks reached the 2001 Eastern Conference Finals by defeating the Charlotte Hornets. They lost the Eastern Conference finals in seven games to the 76ers. This era became known for many Bucks fans as the "Light It Up" era, due to the high-scoring offense of the team, personified by the shooting of Robinson and Allen.

After coming within one game of an NBA Finals appearance in 2001, the Bucks sought to make key off-season player additions to put the team in the NBA Finals. Behind the strong encouragement of George Karl, the Bucks acquired forward Anthony Mason at the beginning of the 2001–02 season. On paper, this move made the Bucks the team to beat in the East. However, Mason battled with his weight and had a tough time finding his role. The Bucks, who at the season's midway point were the fourth seed in the Eastern Conference, went into a swoon in February and March. The collapse culminated with a loss to the Detroit Pistons on the final night of the season, which eliminated the Bucks from the playoffs and gave the division to the Pistons. The fallout created tension between Karl and the players, resulting in a trade of Glenn Robinson to Atlanta (for Toni Kukoč and a 2003 first-round draft pick, used to select T. J. Ford).

During the 2002–03 season, the Bucks traded Ray Allen and backup Ronald "Flip" Murray to the Seattle SuperSonics for Gary Payton and Desmond Mason. The trade allowed emerging star Michael Redd to see increased playing time, and with Payton in the backcourt, they finished the season with a 42–40 record. The Bucks made the playoffs, but lost in the first round to the New Jersey Nets in six games. That offseason, team leaders Sam Cassell and Ervin Johnson were traded to Minnesota (for Joe Smith). Payton left via free agency, after playing only 28 games for the Bucks. Karl's tenure also ended after the season. Within a one-year period, the team had lost the coach and players most responsible for the team's success during that era.

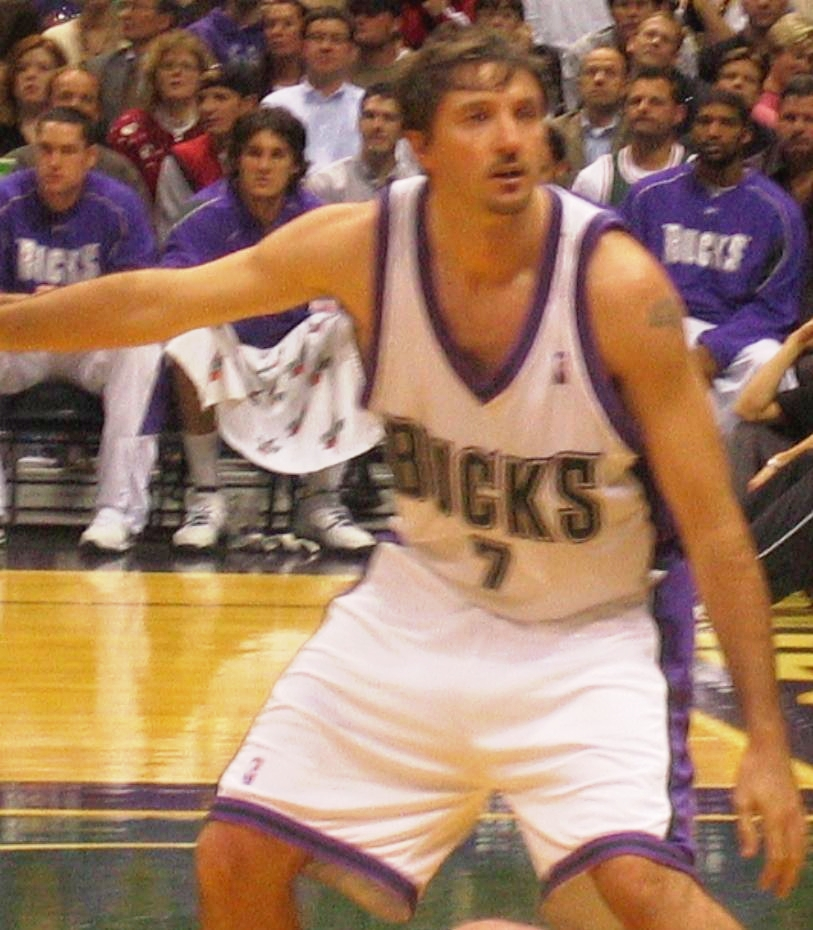
Toni Kukoč playing for the Bucks.

=== 2003–2009: The Michael Redd era ===
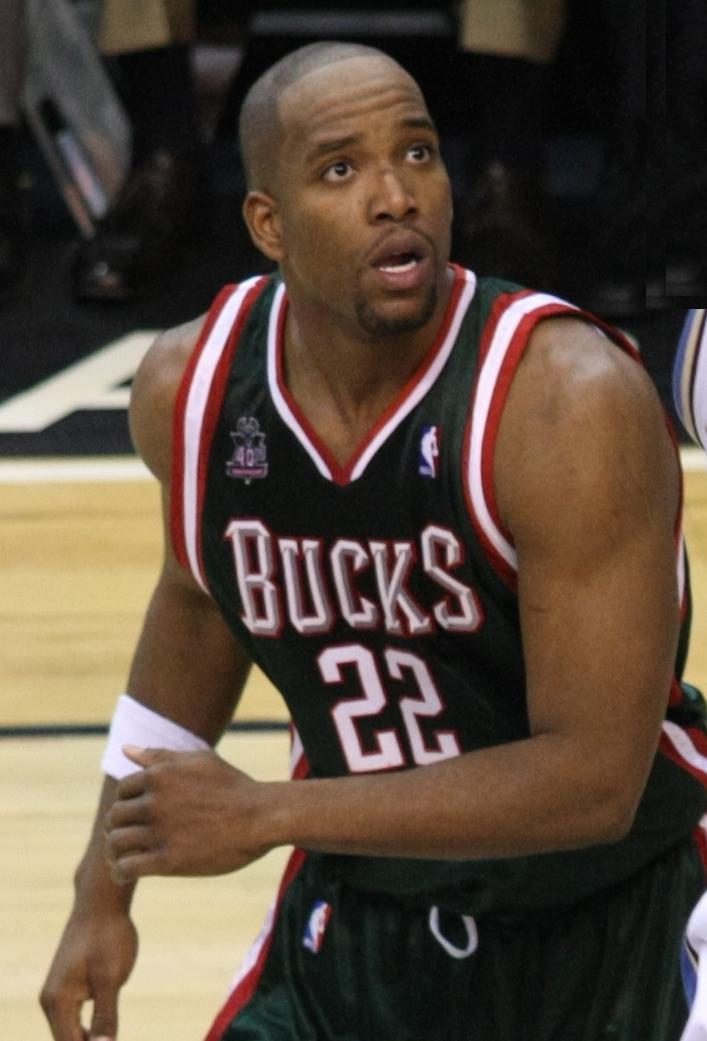
Michael Redd playing for the Bucks.

Under the direction of new general manager Larry Harris, the Bucks struggled with inconsistency and injury for the next six years. During that period, they reached the playoffs twice, first under coach Terry Porter in 2004 and then under Terry Stotts in 2006. In both instances, they were defeated by the Detroit Pistons in five games. During that period, Michael Redd blossomed into an all-star and a perimeter shooting threat, becoming the new "face of the franchise". The Bucks received the first pick in the 2005 NBA draft, and used it to select center Andrew Bogut. Bogut struggled with both inconsistency and injuries in his first four years in Milwaukee, but over time became a key contributor to the Bucks.

In 2006, the team finished 40–42, last in their division, 24 games behind Detroit, but still made the playoffs in a season where every team in their division did. They were paired as the eighth seed versus the 64–18 conference-leading Pistons. They won game three at home, but lost the other four in a 4–1 series loss.

Also in March, the Bucks announced that they would not renew general manager Larry Harris's contract, which was to expire in June. In April, the Bucks hired John Hammond, formerly vice-president of basketball operations for the Pistons, as their new general manager, giving the Milwaukee team a fresh director recently associated with success.

Also in April, the Bucks announced that Larry Krystkowiak, the third and final head coach hired by Larry Harris, had been relieved of his duties. Scott Skiles, formerly of the Chicago Bulls and Phoenix Suns, became head coach.

On June 26, 2008, the Bucks acquired Richard Jefferson from the New Jersey Nets in a trade for 2007 first-round draft pick Yi Jianlian and Bobby Simmons. Later that day, the Bucks selected West Virginia's Joe Alexander with the eighth pick of the NBA draft. Alexander was the first Taiwanese-born player in the NBA.

=== 2009–2013: The Brandon Jennings era ===
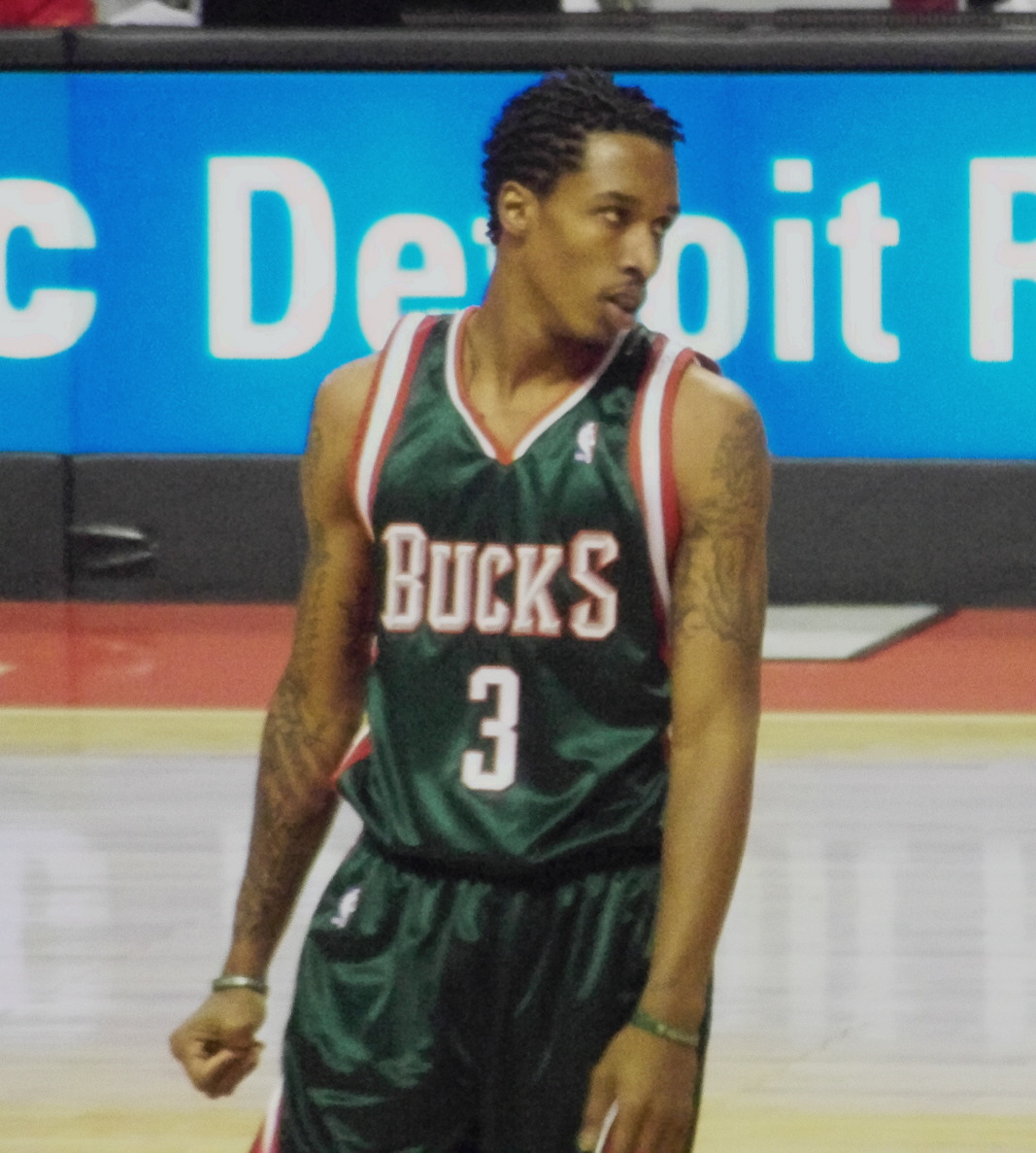
Brandon Jennings

In the 2009 NBA draft, the Milwaukee Bucks selected point guard Brandon Jennings, who had not gone to college but played in Italy the previous year. Midway through the season, Bucks' general manager John Hammond traded Hakim Warrick to the Chicago Bulls, and acquired John Salmons. In a Bucks uniform, Salmons averaged a team-leading 19.9 points per game. The play of Jennings, along with the improvement of Andrew Bogut, the improved Ersan İlyasova, and the Salmons trade, catapulted the team to be a playoff contender. At the beginning of the season, the Bucks had low playoffs expectations; they had not been in four years. In October, the Bucks quickly fell behind the Cleveland Cavaliers in the Central Division, but Milwaukee ultimately clinched a playoff berth on April 6, 2010, with a road win over the Chicago Bulls.

It was during that time that the phrase "Fear the Deer" was coined, most likely by ESPN commentator John Anderson. It was quickly adopted on message boards and within Andrew Bogut's Squad 6. The slogan rang well with Bucks fans, who started bringing signs with the phrase to games. The slogan became the team's battle cry in the NBA playoffs. The Bucks finished the regular season with a record of 46–36. The Bucks clinched the sixth seed and were eliminated in a seven-game series against the Atlanta Hawks. It was the farthest Milwaukee had gotten in the post-season since 2001. The Bucks' short playoff run was also in part due to Bogut suffering a broken arm after making an awkward fall after a dunk in a late-season game, thus ending his season. In the 2010–11 season, the Bucks finished ninth in the Eastern Conference, just out of reach of the playoffs.

With Bogut sidelined for the rest of the season and Stephen Jackson and head coach Scott Skiles not seeing eye-to-eye, the Bucks decided to trade both players. On March 13, 2012, 48 hours before the trade deadline, the Bucks traded Bogut and Jackson to the Golden State Warriors in exchange for Monta Ellis, Ekpe Udoh, and Kwame Brown.

Before the 2012 NBA draft, the Bucks sent a first-round pick, Shaun Livingston, Jon Brockman, and Jon Leuer to the Houston Rockets for a first-round pick and Samuel Dalembert. In the 2012 draft, the Bucks selected Doron Lamb and John Henson.

After 32 games of the 2012–13 season, the Bucks fired Skiles, their coach since 2008. Jim Boylan was announced as the interim head coach and led the Bucks to a 22–28 record to finish the season at 38–44. The Bucks qualified as the eighth seed, where they were quickly swept 4–0 by the reigning, and eventual champions, the Miami Heat.

=== 2013–2026: The Giannis Antetokounmpo era ===
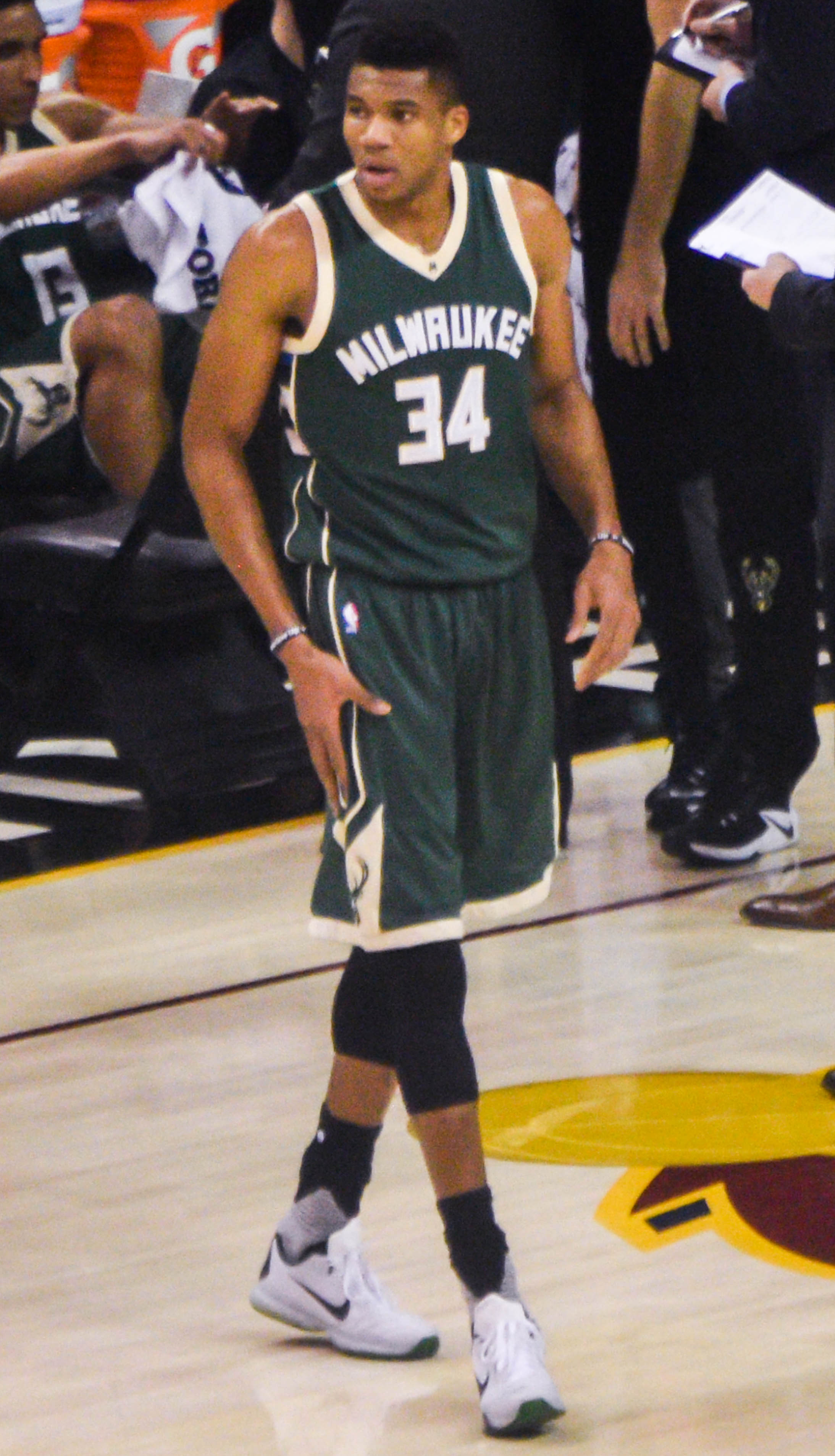
Giannis Antetokounmpo

==== 2013–2014: Under Larry Drew ====
Jim Boylan was relieved of his coaching duties and ex-Atlanta Hawks coach Larry Drew was hired. On June 27, 2013, the Bucks chose Greek forward Giannis Antetokounmpo with the 15th overall pick of the 2013 NBA draft. They also brought in O. J. Mayo, Carlos Delfino, Zaza Pachulia, and Gary Neal as well as seeing Monta Ellis opt-out of the final year of his contract. The Bucks also agreed to sign-and-trade Brandon Jennings to the Detroit Pistons in exchange for Brandon Knight, Khris Middleton, and Viacheslav Kravtsov. The Bucks later extended their contract with Larry Sanders with a four-year, $44 million contract and traded Ish Smith and Kravtsov to the Phoenix Suns for Caron Butler. By the start of the 2013–14 season, the Bucks only had four players on their roster from the previous season. The season itself was a struggle, as the Bucks finished with the worst record in the league at 15–67, the worst record in team history.

On April 16, 2014, long-time Bucks owner Herb Kohl agreed to sell a majority interest of the team to New York-based billionaires Wes Edens, and Marc Lasry for $550 million, but Kohl retained a significant minority interest in the team. The new owners were expected to keep the team in Milwaukee. They were also expected to contribute $100 million toward building a new arena for the franchise. Approval from the NBA Board of Governors came on May 15, a month later. By this time, Bradley Center was seen as obsolete. The donation from the Bradley heirs did not provide for the arena's operating expenses or long-term capital needs. This led the NBA to give an ultimatum to Edens and Lasry–unless the Bucks were either close to getting a new arena or actually opening a new arena by the 2017–18 season, Edens and Lasry would be required to return the franchise to the league, which would sell it to prospective ownership groups in Las Vegas and Seattle.

==== 2014–2018: Under Jason Kidd ====
On July 1, 2014, the Milwaukee Bucks secured the coaching rights for Jason Kidd from the Brooklyn Nets in exchange for two second-round draft picks in the 2015 NBA draft, and the 2019 NBA draft. With the acquisition of Kidd, the team fired coach Larry Drew.

With the many changes to the Bucks in ownership, coaches, and acquiring new young players to rebuild the team, the Bucks' new slogan for the 2014–15 season became "Own The Future."

The Bucks' overall play vastly improved, and on December 13, the Bucks beat the Boston Celtics 107–106 for their 15th win, matching their win total of the previous season just 30 games in. The Bucks then went on a stretch from January 8 to February, where they went 20–2. The Bucks beat the Sacramento Kings on February 1 for their 30th win of the year, and also became the first-ever NBA team to double their win total from the previous season before the All-Star Break.

Off the court, the Bucks made several changes to their roster, releasing Larry Sanders after several off-court incidents that led to multiple suspensions. On February 19, in the final minutes of the trade deadline, the Bucks became part of a 3-way deal with the Philadelphia 76ers and the Phoenix Suns, sending Brandon Knight, who was in the final year of his contract, to the Suns, and receiving reigning Rookie of the Year Michael Carter-Williams, Miles Plumlee, and Tyler Ennis. The Bucks also lost expected superstar Jabari Parker to a season-ending knee injury on December 15 in a game against the Phoenix Suns.

On January 25, the NBA passed the 'Jay-Z Rule', prohibiting ownership groups from consisting of more than 25 individuals, and also mandating that no ownership interest in a team be smaller than 1%. Both Lasry and Edens had sold chunks of Bucks ownership to family, friends, and prominent members of the Milwaukee community.

The Bucks finished the 2014–15 season with a 41–41 record. Their 26-game improvement from the previous season was the second-highest in franchise history. The Bucks made the 2015 NBA playoffs as the 6th seed in the Eastern Conference, where they faced the Chicago Bulls in the first round, losing in six games.

On July 6, 2015, Bucks president Peter Feigin stated if public funding for a new arena fell through, the NBA could have bought the team and moved it to Las Vegas or Seattle. Current Bucks owners Wes Edens, Marc Lasry and Jamie Dinan combined with Herb Kohl to pledge $250 million for a new arena and sought a match from the public. Of those funds, $93 million would come from the Wisconsin Center District in the form of new debt on Milwaukee citizens. The district would not commence repaying the bonds until 13 years thereafter.

On July 9, 2015, the Bucks confirmed their signing of center Greg Monroe to a three-year, $50 million contract. The Bucks also announced the club's re-signing of Khris Middleton to a five-year, $70 million contract.

On July 15, 2015, the future for the Bucks in Milwaukee was solidified after the Wisconsin State Senate voted 21–10 in favor of a proposal to use public money to help finance a replacement for the BMO Harris Bradley Center, which at the time was the third-oldest arena being used by an NBA team, behind Oracle Arena, and Madison Square Garden.

On the court, the young roster of the Bucks went through a step backward, to a 33–49 record in the 2015–16 season, though Giannis Antetokounmpo had an encouraging stretch in the final half of the season, accumulating 5 triple-doubles.

On June 18, 2016, ground was broken for the Bucks' new arena.

On September 19, 2016, the Bucks and Giannis Antetokounmpo agreed to a 4-year, $100 million contract extension. In addition, the team would add new young improvements to the roster in drafting Thon Maker and Malcolm Brogdon, and made trades to bring in Tony Snell and Michael Beasley. When the 2016–17 season began, the Bucks were without Khris Middleton, who suffered a torn hamstring during a practice. Even so, the Bucks remained competitive, staying around .500 for the first half of the season, with both Antetokounmpo and Jabari Parker leading the offense. While Parker missed making the All-Star team, Giannis was voted in as a starter, becoming the first Bucks All-Star since Michael Redd in 2004.

In January, the Bucks slumped, though fans anticipated a turnaround with Middleton's return on February 8 against the Miami Heat. In the same game, however, Parker tore his ACL for the second time in 3 seasons, ending his season. Even so, Middleton's return still sparked a turnaround in March. During the month, the Bucks went 14–4, putting the team back in the thick of the playoff race. On April 8, 2017, the Bucks beat the Philadelphia 76ers 90–82, clinching the Bucks a playoff spot. On April 10, the Bucks beat the Charlotte Hornets 89–79 to clinch only the third winning season for the Bucks since 2001. The team finished the 2016–17 regular season with a 42–40 record. Giannis Antetokounmpo made history, becoming only the 5th player in NBA history to lead his team in all five major statistical categories, and was the first in NBA history to finish in the top 20 in the league in each category. The Bucks were the #6 seed in the Eastern Conference playoffs, and lost in the opening round to the Toronto Raptors, 4–2.

On May 23, 2017, Bucks general manager John Hammond stepped down to become general manager with the Orlando Magic.

On January 22, 2018, the Bucks fired Jason Kidd, who had a 23–22 record in the 2017–18 season. In Kidd's three and a half seasons as head coach, the Bucks had a regular-season record of 139–152 and reached the first round of the NBA playoffs in the 2014–15 and 2016–17 seasons. Bucks' assistant coach Joe Prunty was announced as Kidd's replacement on an interim basis for the rest of the season. Prunty finished the season with a 21–16 record, leading the Bucks to an overall 44–38 record, their best since the 2009–10 season. Seeded seventh in the 2017–18 Eastern Conference playoffs, the Bucks lost the series to the second-seeded Boston Celtics, 4–3.

==== 2018–2023: Under Mike Budenholzer ====
On May 17, 2018, the Bucks announced former San Antonio Spurs' assistant coach and former Atlanta Hawks head coach Mike Budenholzer as their new head coach. On August 26, 2018, the Bucks' new arena, Fiserv Forum, opened to the public.

Since 2018, the Bucks host Pride Night at Fiserv Forum, an event to celebrate the LGBTQ+ community. On January 22, 2022, the annual event was hosted for the 5th time.

The Bucks stormed through their 2018–19 regular season, racing out to a 25–10 start en route to finishing 60–22, the fifth 60-win season in franchise history and the first time they had won that many in a regular season since the 1980–81 season. They also finished with the league-best record for the second time in franchise history, equalling their 1970–71 championship season. This earned them home-court advantage in any playoff series for the first time since 2001, and only the second time in the new millennium. On April 22, 2019, the Bucks swept the Detroit Pistons for their first playoff series win since 2001. On May 8, they eliminated the Boston Celtics in five games to reach their first Conference Finals since 2001, where they lost to the eventual league champion Toronto Raptors in six games. After the season, Giannis Antetokounmpo was named the league's Most Valuable Player. General Manager Jon Horst won the NBA Executive of the Year award.

In their 2019–20 season, the Bucks clinched a playoff berth after the team's 56th regular-season game, becoming the fastest team to clinch a playoff spot measured by the number of games played and by the calendar date (February 23) since the NBA changed its playoff format in 1984. Following the suspension of the 2019–20 NBA season, the Bucks were one of the 22 teams invited to the NBA Bubble to participate in the final 8 games of the regular season. On August 26, the Bucks’ players refused to play in their playoff matchup against the Orlando Magic following the shooting of Jacob Blake by police. Antetokounmpo received his second consecutive Most Valuable Player award after returning home from the NBA Bubble upon the Bucks losing in the semi-finals of the 2020 NBA playoffs to the Miami Heat. During the first possession of a 2020–21 regular season game against the Detroit Pistons on January 6, both teams took a knee in protest to the announcement that criminal charges would not be filed against police officers in the Blake shooting. The Bucks held the ball for seven seconds in reference to Blake's seven gunshots.

During the offseason, the Bucks signed Antetokounmpo to a 5-year, $228 million contract extension, the largest contract in NBA history. Along with resigning their superstar, the Bucks also made a trade which resulted in Eric Bledsoe and George Hill being sent to the New Orleans Pelicans and receiving a former All-Defense player in Jrue Holiday. The Bucks also strengthened their bench with free agent signings of Bobby Portis and Bryn Forbes. In their 2020–21 season, the Bucks clinched the third seed in the Eastern Conference with a record of 46–26, as well as their third consecutive Central Division title. It was the third consecutive season the Bucks had a winning percentage of at least .600, the first time it had happened in franchise history since 1984–86. During the season, the Bucks acquired P. J. Tucker to further strengthen their defense for the playoffs.

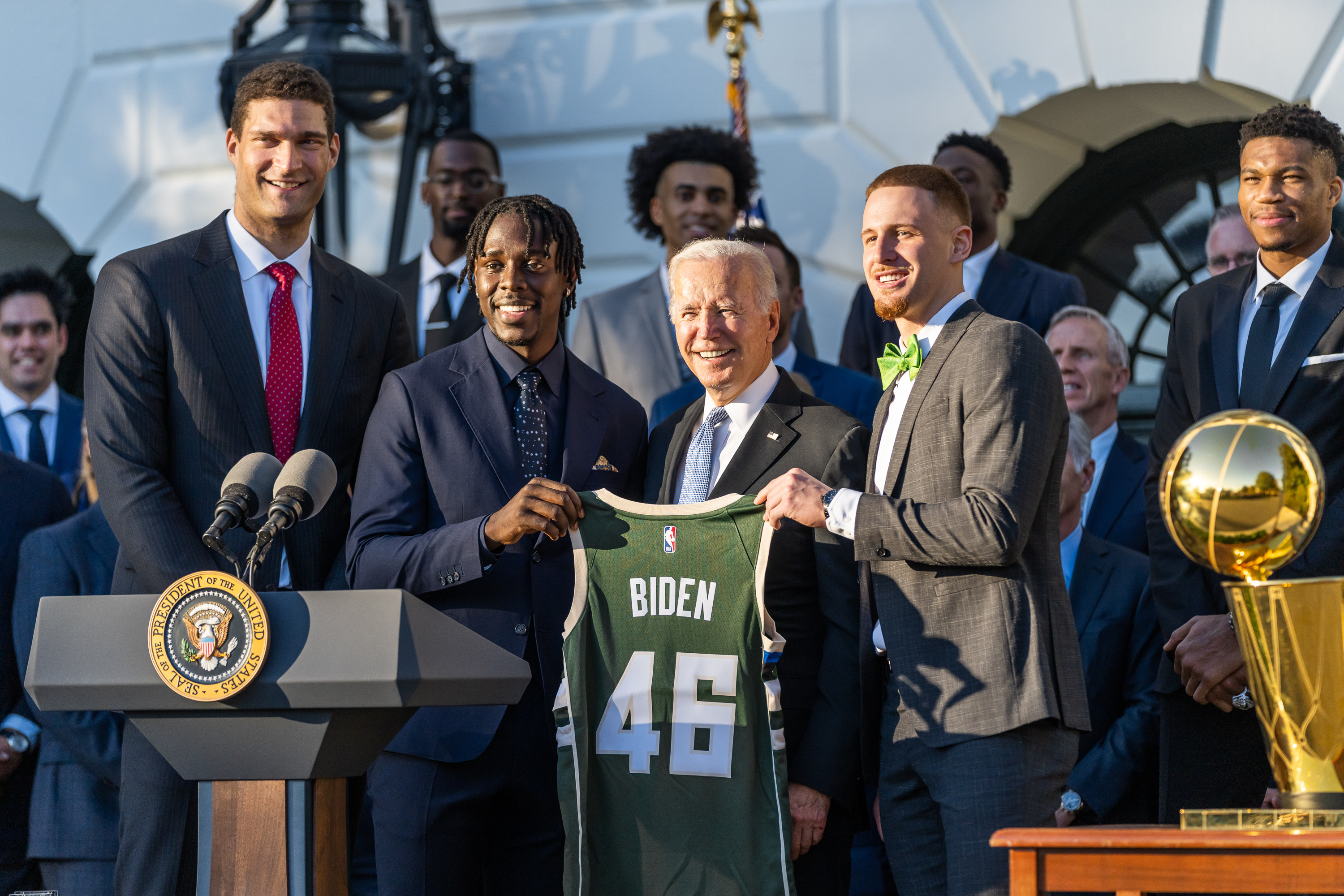
Members of the Milwaukee Bucks celebrating their 2021 championship at the White House

In the 2021 NBA playoffs, the Bucks began by defeating the Heat in a four-game sweep in the first round in a rematch of the previous year's Eastern Conference Semifinals. They then defeated the Brooklyn Nets (led by Kevin Durant, Kyrie Irving and James Harden) in seven games in the Conference Semifinals, culminating with a Game 7 victory on the road at Barclays Center. They then defeated the Atlanta Hawks in six games in the Conference Finals to secure their 3rd NBA Finals appearance in franchise history and their first since 1974. In the NBA Finals, the Bucks faced the Phoenix Suns, who were favored after defeating the defending champion Los Angeles Lakers in the Western Conference first round. The Bucks came back from down 2–0 to win the series. Antetokounmpo was named Finals MVP after averaging 35.2 points, 13.2 rebounds, 5.0 assists, 1.2 steals, and 1.8 blocks in the series including a 50-point performance in a 105–98 Game 6 victory at Fiserv Forum.

The Bucks finished 2021–22 with a 51–31 record, their 4th consecutive season with a winning percentage of .600 or better, as well as their 4th consecutive Central Division title, their longest streak of division championships since 1979–1986. Once again with the 3-seed in the Eastern Conference, the Bucks beat the rival Chicago Bulls 4 games to 1 in the first round, but lost Middleton to a sprained knee in game 2. Without Middleton, the Bucks struggled to find offensive support for Antetokounmpo in the Eastern Conference semifinals against the Boston Celtics. Though the Bucks had a 3–2 lead in the series, they would lose game 6 at home and game 7 on the road, ending their season.

During the 2022 off-season, the Bucks selected MarJon Beauchamp and Hugo Besson with the 24th and 58th overall picks in the 2022 NBA draft respectively. The Bucks also re-signed Portis to a 4-year, $48 million contract as well as Wesley Matthews and Serge Ibaka to 1-year deals and Jevon Carter to a 2-year, $4.3 million deal. The Bucks also signed Joe Ingles to a 1-year deal out of free agency. Despite Middleton playing just 33 games over the course of the 2022–23 season, the Bucks finished with a 58–24 record, the best in the league. They went into the 2023 NBA playoffs as the 1st seed in the Eastern Conference and faced the Miami Heat in the first round. Antetokounmpo suffered a back injury just a few minutes into the first game of the series following a blocking foul from Kevin Love as Antetokounmpo was driving to the basket. Antetokounmpo would go on to miss games 2 and 3 and, despite his return for games 4 and 5, the Bucks lost the series 4–1. On May 4, 2023, a week after their series loss, the Bucks announced the firing of Budenholzer.

==== 2023–2026: Coaching changes, arrival of Damian Lillard ====
On June 5, 2023, the Bucks announced that former Toronto Raptors assistant coach Adrian Griffin would be their new head coach. On September 27, 2023, the Bucks acquired seven-time all-star point guard Damian Lillard in a 3-team trade. On January 23, 2024, the Bucks fired Griffin after only 43 games. On January 26, 2024, the Bucks named Doc Rivers as the new head coach. They would finish the season with a 49–33 record and the third seed, however Antetokounmpo would miss the entire first round due a late season injury, allowing the Indiana Pacers to pull off the upset in six games.

On December 17, 2024, the Bucks won their first NBA Cup, after defeating the Oklahoma City Thunder in the championship game in Las Vegas. Giannis Antetokounmpo was named the tournament's MVP.

During the season, the Bucks would trade away Khris Middleton after 10+ seasons with the franchise. They would qualify for the playoffs for ninth straight season, finishing as the fifth seed with a 48–34 record. However, the Bucks would be eliminated in the first round for the third straight season, falling again to Indiana Pacers this time in five games, with Lillard suffering a torn achilles in Game 4.

The off-season saw the Bucks let go of Brook Lopez and Pat Connaughton after seven seasons with the franchise, as well the decision to waive-and-stretch Damian Lillard following his achilles injury, using the cap space to bring in Myles Turner from the rival Indiana Pacers.

On October 13, 2025, the Bucks signed Alex Antetokounmpo to a two-way contract, making him teammates with his brothers Giannis and Thanasis for the first time. The signing marked the first time in NBA history that three brothers played on the same active roster.

The Bucks would struggle to a 32–50 record, missing the playoffs for the first time since 2016–17, as Antetokounmpo only appeared in 36 games in a season that saw him suffer multiple injuries. Following the season, Rivers would resign from his position as head coach.

=== 2026–present: Post-Giannis and arrival of Tyler Herro ===
On April 30, 2026, the Bucks hired former Memphis Grizzlies head coach Taylor Jenkins as their new head coach, Jenkins was under Mike Budenholzer coaching staff from 2018–19 season. On June 23, the Bucks trading Giannis Antetokounmpo and Bobby Portis to the Miami Heat exchange for Tyler Herro, Jaime Jaquez Jr., Kel'el Ware and Kasparas Jakučionis. Later that day, the Bucks selected Brayden Burries with ten pick and Nate Ament with thirteenth pick in 2026 NBA Draft.

== Ownership ==
As of September 26, 2024, the following individuals and groups are among the owners of the Bucks:

- Jamie Dinan, Hedge fund manager and founder of York Capital Management
- Wes Edens, co-founder of the Fortress Investment Group LLC, based in New York City.
- Giacamo Falluca, CEO Palermo's Pizza.
- Michael D. Fascitelli, former CEO of Vornado Realty Trust.
- Jimmy and Dee Haslam, owners of the NFL's Cleveland Browns and the Columbus Crew of Major League Soccer, bought the 25% interest of Marc Lasry, CEO and co-founder of Avenue Capital Group, in 2023.
- Junior Bridgeman, businessman and former Bucks player whose number 2 has been retired by the franchise, purchased a 10% interest in the team in 2024. According to Jimmy Haslam, a number of people who owned 1% or less of the team wished to sell their stakes, which were then sold to Bridgeman.
- Jon Hammes, Co-chair of fundraising for Scott Walker's 2016 presidential campaign.
- Jeffrey A. Joerres, Executive chairman of ManpowerGroup.
- Jim Kacmarcik, President of Kapco, a metal stamping company in Grafton, Wisconsin.
- Craig Karmazin, CEO of Good Karma Brands, which owns radio stations WTMJ (the team's flagship station), WKTI and WGKB in the Milwaukee market.
- Ted Kellner, Chairman of the board and CEO, Fiduciary Management, Inc. and formerly of the Marshall & Ilsley Corporation board of directors.
- Gale Klappa, Executive Chairman Wisconsin Energy Corporation.
- Michael Kocourek, President of Mid Oaks Investments.
- Partners for Community Impact,
- Keith Mardak, Chairman and CEO of Hal Leonard Corporation, a sheet music company.
- Agustin Ramirez, Executive chairman of Waukesha-based HUSCO International Inc.
- Austin Ramirez, President and CEO of HUSCO International.
- Adam Stern, Minority owner of the Milwaukee Brewers, a managing director and head of business development at Aristeia Capital, a New York City-based asset management firm.
- Marc Stern, Minority owner of the Milwaukee Brewers, chairman TCW Group Inc.
- Teddy Werner, Milwaukee Brewers vice president of business development and son of Boston Red Sox chairman Tom Werner.
- Aaron Rodgers, American football player for the Pittsburgh Steelers of the National Football League (NFL).

== Mascot ==
The Bucks' official mascot is Bango. The word "Bango" was originally coined by Eddie Doucette, the longtime play-by-play announcer for the Bucks. Doucette used the word whenever a Bucks player connected on a long-range basket. It was often used for sharpshooter Jon McGlocklin. When it came time for the Bucks to choose a name for their new mascot, the name "Bango" won the contest.

Bango has been the Bucks' official mascot since October 18, 1977, which was Milwaukee's home opener of the 1977–78 season. In addition to the date being Bango's home debut, the game itself pitted Milwaukee against former Bucks center Kareem Abdul-Jabbar and his Los Angeles Lakers at the Milwaukee Arena. Bango's original outfit only consisted of a green wool sweater with a "B" on the front, similar to the buck featured on the team logo. Since the 1990s, Bango now wears a Bucks uniform with the number 68, referring to the franchise's inaugural season of 1968. Bango has worked hard to become popular with Bucks fans throughout the state of Wisconsin over the years, appearing at schools, parades, and festivals as a goodwill ambassador for the team. His high-flying acrobatic layups, daring rebounds, and other entertaining antics still play an important role in energizing Bucks fans at the Fiserv Forum. Since 2001, Bango has also made perennial appearances at the NBA All-Star Game.

At the 2009 All-Star Weekend in Phoenix, Arizona, Bango suffered an injury during a mascot-participative skit. While standing on one basket's rim, Bango's right leg slipped through the hoop, and he fell on the rim. He then slipped further and fell through the basket entirely. Bango tore his ACL due to the fall and was unable to perform for the remainder of the 2008–09 season, periodically making appearances at games in a wheelchair. A video of Bango's injury at the 2009 Mascot Challenge was uploaded onto YouTube shortly after the incident occurred.

During game four of the 2009–10 first-round playoff series between the Milwaukee Bucks and the Atlanta Hawks, Bango successfully performed a back-flip dunk from the top of a 16-foot ladder, a feat similar to the Seattle SuperSonics' mascot Squatch's feat during a March 19, 2008, game between the SuperSonics and the Phoenix Suns.

Bango has also dunked the ball while in a human hamster wheel in 2012 and made a behind-the-back half-court shot in New Orleans at the NBA All-Star game. In 2010 Bango was named Mascot of the Year, and later in 2011 was awarded, Most Awesome Mascot", by Cartoon Network. Bango has also made many television appearances. He appeared in an ESPN commercial with Brandon Jennings in 2011, and then appeared in another ESPN commercial with Giannis Antetokounmpo in 2018. In 2013, Bango was featured on a Hulu original documentary series called, Behind the Mask. This documentary featured the trials and tribulations of sports mascots. The 20-episode series focuses on the unsung heroes of sports mascots. The series follows the lives of seven mascots at different levels, both inside and outside the suit.

== Logos and uniforms ==
=== 1968–1977 ===
The Bucks entered the NBA wearing hunter green and white uniforms with red trim. The white uniform featured "Bucks" in green serifed letters with red trim and block numbers, while the green uniform has "Milwaukee" in white serifed letters with red trim. Both sets have the deer head logo on the left leg. The Bucks would bring back the green uniform in the 2002–03 season, and the white uniform in the 2017–18 season as part of the league's "Classic" uniform series.

Prior to the 1971–72 season, the letters on the white uniform changed to red with green trim, with "Bucks" now taking a block letter style. They kept the original green uniform until 1973, when it was modified to feature a script "Milwaukee" in red with white trim and numbers below the left chest. Both sets removed the deer head logo on the shorts.

In the 1975–76 season, the Bucks' white uniform changed to feature a script "Bucks" lettering and numbers on the left chest. The green uniform brought back the block "Milwaukee" lettering and centered numbers but kept the red base and white trim. The striping on the shorts was also modified.

=== 1977–1993 ===
Coinciding with the debut of Robert Indiana's iconic MECCA court in the 1977–78 season, the Bucks redesigned their uniforms. It now featured side stripes of kelly, lime and hunter green (a.k.a. the "Irish Rainbows"). Both the hunter green and white uniforms featured the streamlined "Bucks" lettering from the team logo and block lettering. They removed the color red prior to the 1985–86 season, while lime green was promoted to accent color.

=== 1993–2006 ===
The Bucks changed their logo and uniforms for the 1993–94 season. Green was relegated to trim color in favor of purple, while silver was added as an accent color. The original white uniform featured the letters in green with silver and purple trim, while the purple uniform featured letters in white with green and silver trim. In the 2001–02 season, the uniforms were tweaked to include the alternate antler logo on the waist along with extended side stripes. Letters on the purple uniform were now silver with green and white trim. The purple uniform from this era would be reused in the 2022–23 season as part of the "Classic" edition series.

1995–99 Uniform

In the 1995–96 season the Bucks unveiled a hunter green alternate uniform. The script "Bucks" lettering was in white fading to silver and purple and numbers were in white with green and purple trim. The uniform featured the graphic deer logo on the right side. They were retired after the 1998–99 season. It would be resurrected for the 2012–13 season during Hardwood Classics Nights, to updated uniform standards.

According to former NBA creative director Tom O'Grady, the Bucks' purple and green color scheme was inspired by a mysterious FedEx package that O'Grady received in 1992, containing a dark green cap and purple shirt with the logo of the Wimbledon Championships, and a handwritten letter by then-Bucks general manager Mike Dunleavy Sr.

=== 2006–2015 ===
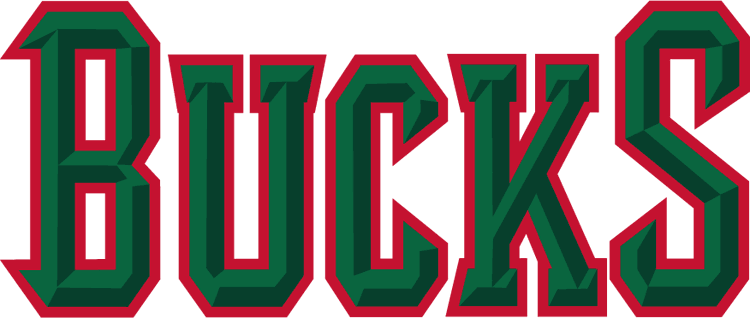
Milwaukee Bucks wordmark, 2006–2015.

The uniforms were changed again for the 2006–07 season. The new home uniform was white with hunter green stripes on the sides. Inside each green stripe is a thinner red stripe that splits into two stripes near the shoulders. The numbers are green with a red outline. Milwaukee had two road uniforms as part of this set. The primary one was hunter green and a similar design to the home uniform with white numbers with a silver highlight and red outline. Both uniforms jerseys said "BUCKS" across the chest in beveled block letters, the 'B' and 'S' slightly larger than the rest of the letters. A secondary road uniform was introduced in the 2008–09 season. Consisting of red jersey and shorts, it was made to resemble the 1968–73 uniforms. It says "Milwaukee" in white and silver writing, along with the numbers. The uniform set was tweaked for the 2014–15 season, with the addition of a gold tab commemorating their 1971 championship and the move of the NBA logo to the back. The 'Bucks' lettering was tweaked to make all the letters the same height.

During the 2014–15 season, hints were made by the Bucks that their logo and uniforms were going to be redesigned. For one home game, it was anticipated that new uniforms were going to be revealed with hunter orange replacing red as the secondary color. It turned out to be an April Fool's joke, though the Bucks did announce that a new logo and colors would be revealed on April 13, 2015.

=== 2015–present ===
On April 13, 2015, the Milwaukee Bucks unveiled new primary and secondary logos, as well as a new color scheme. The new branding will take effect beginning with the 2015–16 NBA season. The Bucks' new official colors are Good Land green (a reference to "Milwaukee" being supposedly based on an Algonquian word meaning "The Good Land"), Cream City cream (based on Milwaukee's old nickname of "the Cream City", which came from the cream-colored bricks that were used for constructing many of Milwaukee's buildings back during the late 19th century), Great Lakes blue, black, and white.

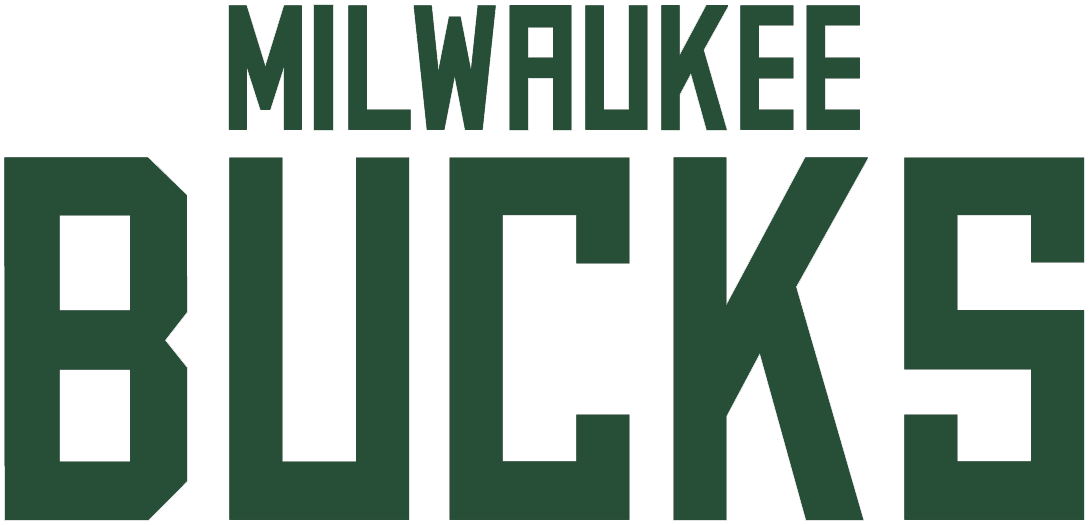
Milwaukee Bucks wordmark, 2015–present.

On June 6, 2015, the Milwaukee Bucks unveiled their new home and road uniforms, to be worn beginning with the 2015–16 season. The new uniforms remained white at home and green on the road, but red is now replaced by cream. The 'Milwaukee' city name also returned to the road uniforms for the first time since 1976. In addition, the jerseys feature a unique color block pattern on the sides, titled the "Cream City Rainbow". The pattern consists of the team's new colors of green, cream, royal blue and black, which the Bucks described as an homage to the "Irish Rainbow" design of the 1980s. Blue was also included inside the collar, representing Milwaukee and Wisconsin's "blue collar" citizens, while the inscription "Fear the Deer" was written on the bottom left upside down. The back collar features a small gold tab above the NBA logo, commemorating the Bucks' 1971 and 2021 NBA championships.

On October 3, 2015, the Milwaukee Bucks unveiled a new black alternate uniform. The uniforms still feature the trim and the "Cream City Rainbow" on the sides, with the new Bucks logo in the center and the uniform number placed between the antlers of the logo. In conjunction with the unveiling of the uniform, dubbed the "Fear the Deer uniform", the team also unveiled a new alternate court design, a first in NBA history. The team planned to wear the black alternate uniform and play on the alternate court design for at least four home games during the 2015–16 season.

In 2017, as part of the NBA's new protocol for uniforms, with each team allotted 5 different uniform sets, the Bucks added to their regular home (now "Association" white) and road (now "Icon" green) uniforms, as well as their alternate black ("Statement") uniforms. For their retro uniform, the Bucks went with a replica version of their inaugural home uniforms from 1968 to 1970, as part of the Bucks celebrating their 50th season in the NBA. In addition, the Bucks were also given new "City" uniforms, conceived by Nike as a way of commemorating each of the NBA teams' city history and pride. The "City" uniforms, dubbed "Cream City" uniforms, featured cream-colored jerseys and shorts, with the "Cream City Rainbow" running horizontally along the front of the uniform, with the Bucks logo in the middle. The "Cream City Rainbow" was also on the shorts, shaped in an "M" on both sides that are part of the regular Bucks' uniform design. This design was brought back in the 2026–27 season.

For the 2018–19 season, Milwaukee's "City" uniform will pay homage to Robert Indiana's famous MECCA court, featuring yellow, beige and red as base colors and light blue and forest green on the hem of the shorts. "Bucks" is written vertically on the right while the number is on the left; both are in forest green with lime green trim. The Bucks would also wear an "Earned" uniform by virtue of qualifying in the 2018 playoffs; this uniform is essentially the "City" uniform but with the visual elements of red with green stripes, inspired from the 1977–1985 "Irish Rainbow" home uniform.

The Bucks made slight updates to the black "Statement" uniform prior to the 2019–20 season. It was essentially a black version of the team's 2017–18 "City" uniform, with the exception of the "Fear the Deer" insignia on the beltline and near the jock tag.

The Bucks' 2019–20 "City" uniform again used a cream base, this time with a stylized "Cream City" wordmark in front. Blue, cream and green stripes run through the piping while a giant "M" insignia is featured on the shorts. These uniforms are a nod to the team's fondness of the cream-colored brick buildings which surround the city of Milwaukee. This uniform was brought back for the 2025–26 season.

The 2020–21 Bucks "City" uniform used three shades of Great Lakes Blue as its base color. The uniform was a nod to Milwaukee's meaning as "the gathering place by the water" due to the city's location at the confluence of the Milwaukee, Menomonee and Kinnickinnic rivers flowing into Lake Michigan.

As in 2019, the Bucks were given an "Earned" uniform after making the 2020 playoffs. This design, with a predominantly green base, featured "Bucks," the uniform number and piping in white with black trim, and stylized antlers on each side.

The 2021–22 Bucks "City" uniform combined different elements of each of the Bucks' different uniform designs during their history, as part of the NBA's 75th season celebration. The jersey is white, with arched block letters, similar to their first uniforms. The sides featured the different shades of green from the team's "Irish Rainbow" uniform, as well as one line of blue from their current "Cream City Rainbow". Down the rest of the side of the jersey is purple, from the team's uniforms of the late 1990s, early 2000s.

Starting with the 2022–23 season, the green "Earned" uniform worn in 2021 became the basis of the team's new black "Statement" uniform. Also during the season, the Bucks' "City" uniform paid homage to the Bronzeville neighborhood, featuring a blue base, cream trim and rainbow side stripes of black, blue, cream and green. The team chose replicas of their 2000–01 purple road uniforms for their "Classic" uniform.

For the 2023–24 "City" uniform, the Bucks wore a blue-based uniform with cream and green accents; the cream curving stripes surrounding the blue "Milwaukee" wordmark were meant to represent the Fiserv Forum architecture. The design was inspired by the fans that flood the neighborhood in Deer District, and were represented by light blue speckles.

Blue again served as the base color of the 2024–25 "City" uniform, featuring jagged cream and black stripes as reference to Wisconsin's borders. The design was inspired by the team's unifying impact and bond with the state's fanbase.

== Season-by-season record ==
List of the last five seasons completed by the Bucks. For the full season-by-season history, see List of Milwaukee Bucks seasons.

Note: GP = Games played, W = Wins, L = Losses, W–L% = Winning percentage

Season	GP	W	L	W–L%	Finish	Playoffs
2021–22	82	51	31	.622	1st, Central	Lost in conference semifinals, 3–4 (Celtics)
2022–23	82	58	24	.707	1st, Central	Lost in first round, 1–4 (Heat)
2023–24	82	49	33	.598	1st, Central	Lost in first round, 2–4 (Pacers)
2024–25	82	48	34	.585	3rd, Central	Lost in first round, 1–4 (Pacers)
2025–26	82	32	50	.390	3rd, Central	Did not qualify

== Personnel ==
=== Current roster ===
Milwaukee Bucks roster
Players

Pos.	No.	Player	Height	Weight	DOB	From
F	15	Nate Ament	6 ft 10 in (2.08 m)	207 lb (94 kg)	2006-12-10	Tennessee
G	0	Brayden Burries	6 ft 4 in (1.93 m)	205 lb (93 kg)	2005-09-18	Arizona
F	21	Ousmane Dieng (injured)	6 ft 9 in (2.06 m)	185 lb (84 kg)	2003-05-21	France
G	20	A. J. Green	6 ft 4 in (1.93 m)	190 lb (86 kg)	1999-09-27	Northern Iowa
G	11	Tyler Herro	6 ft 5 in (1.96 m)	195 lb (88 kg)	2000-01-20	Kentucky
G	25	Kasparas Jakučionis	6 ft 5 in (1.96 m)	200 lb (91 kg)	2006-05-29	Illinois
G	24	Jaime Jaquez Jr.	6 ft 7 in (2.01 m)	225 lb (102 kg)	2001-02-18	UCLA
G	19	Kam Jones (TW)	6 ft 4 in (1.93 m)	200 lb (91 kg)	2002-02-25	Marquette
F	18	Kyle Kuzma	6 ft 8 in (2.03 m)	221 lb (100 kg)	1995-07-24	Utah
G	12	Caris LeVert	6 ft 7 in (2.01 m)	205 lb (93 kg)	1994-08-25	Michigan
F	23	Bogoljub Marković	6 ft 10 in (2.08 m)	210 lb (95 kg)	2005-07-12	Serbia
F	35	Pete Nance (TW)	6 ft 9 in (2.06 m)	225 lb (102 kg)	2000-02-19	North Carolina
G	13	Ryan Rollins	6 ft 3 in (1.91 m)	180 lb (82 kg)	2002-07-03	Toledo
G	30	Cormac Ryan (TW)	6 ft 5 in (1.96 m)	205 lb (93 kg)	1998-10-26	North Carolina
C	00	Jericho Sims	6 ft 10 in (2.08 m)	250 lb (113 kg)	1998-10-20	Texas
G	5	Gary Trent Jr.	6 ft 4 in (1.93 m)	204 lb (93 kg)	1999-01-18	Duke
F/C	3	Myles Turner	6 ft 11 in (2.11 m)	250 lb (113 kg)	1996-03-24	Texas
C	9	Kel'el Ware	7 ft 0 in (2.13 m)	230 lb (104 kg)	2004-04-20	Indiana

Coaches
Head coach
- Taylor Jenkins
Assistant(s)
- Johnny Carpenter
- Darvin Ham
- Jack Herum
- T. J. Ford
- Brad Jones
- Vince Legarza
- Patrick St. Andrews
- Isaiah Wilkins

Legend
- (DP) Unsigned draft pick
- (FA) Free agent
- (S) Suspended
- (GL) On assignment to G League affiliate
- (TW) Two-way affiliate player
- Injured

Roster
Updated: October 19, 2026

=== Retained draft rights ===
The Bucks hold the draft rights to the following unsigned draft picks who have been playing outside the NBA. A drafted player, either an international draftee or a college draftee who is not signed by the team that drafted him, is allowed to sign with any non-NBA team. In this case, the team retains the player's draft rights in the NBA until one year after the player's contract with the non-NBA team ends. This list includes draft rights that were acquired from trades with other teams.

Draft	Round	Pick	Player	Pos.	Nationality	Current team	Note(s)	Ref

=== Basketball Hall of Famers ===
Milwaukee Bucks Hall of Famers
Players
No.	Name	Position	Tenure	Inducted
1	Oscar Robertson ^{1}	G	1970–1974	1980
36	Dave Cowens	C/F	1982–1983	1991
7	Nate Archibald	G	1983–1984	1991
16	Bob Lanier	C	1980–1984	1992
33	Kareem Abdul-Jabbar	C	1969–1975	1995
22; 23	Alex English	F	1976–1978	1997
8	Moses Malone	C/F	1991–1993	2001
7	Adrian Dantley	F/G	1990–1991	2008
20	Gary Payton	G	2003	2013
5	Guy Rodgers	G	1968–1970	2014
34	Ray Allen	G	1996–2003	2018
4	Sidney Moncrief	G	1979–1990	2019
43	Jack Sikma	C	1986–1991	2019
10	Bob Dandridge	F	1969–1977; 1981	2021
7	Toni Kukoč	F	2002–2006	2021
17	Pau Gasol	F/C	2019	2023
Coaches
Name		Position	Tenure	Inducted
Don Nelson		Head coach	1976–1987	2012
George Karl		Head coach	1998–2003	2022
Doc Rivers		Head coach	2023–2026	2026
Contributors
Name		Position	Tenure	Inducted
15	Wayne Embry ^{2}	General manager	1972–1979	1999
Hubie Brown		Assistant coach	1972–1974	2005
Larry Costello		Head coach	1968–1976	2022
Del Harris		Assistant coach Head coach	1986–1987; 1987–1991	2022

Notes:

- ^{1} In total, Robertson was inducted into the Hall of Fame twice – as player and as a member of the 1960 Olympic team.
- ^{2} Inducted as contributor for being the first African American to manage a team in the NBA. He also played for the team in 1968–1969.

=== FIBA Hall of Famers ===
Milwaukee Bucks Hall of Famers
Players
No.	Name	Position	Tenure	Inducted
1	Oscar Robertson	G	1970–1974	2009
7	Toni Kukoč	F	2002–2006	2017
6	Andrew Bogut	C	2005–2012	2025
17	Pau Gasol	F/C	2019	2025

=== Retired numbers ===
Milwaukee Bucks retired numbers
No.	Player	Position	Tenure	Date
1	Oscar Robertson	G	1970–1974	October 18, 1974
2	Junior Bridgeman	F	1975–1984; 1986–1987	January 17, 1988
4	Sidney Moncrief	G	1979–1990	January 6, 1990
8	Marques Johnson	F	1977–1984	March 24, 2019
10	Bob Dandridge	F	1969–1977; 1981	March 7, 2015
14	Jon McGlocklin	G	1968–1976	December 10, 1976
16	Bob Lanier	C	1980–1984	December 4, 1984
32	Brian Winters	G	1975–1983	October 28, 1983
33	Kareem Abdul-Jabbar	C	1969–1975	April 24, 1993

- The NBA retired Bill Russell's No. 6 for all its member teams on August 11, 2022.
- The team announced that Giannis Antetokounmpo's No. 34 will be retired by the organization.

=== General manager history ===
GM history
Name	Tenure
John Erickson	1968–1970
Ray Patterson	1970–1972
Wayne Embry	1972–1977
Don Nelson	1977–1987
Del Harris	1987–1992
Mike Dunleavy	1992–1997
Bob Weinhauer	1997–1999
Ernie Grunfeld	1999–2003
Larry Harris	2003–2008
John Hammond	2008–2017
Jon Horst	2017–present

== Home arenas ==
- Milwaukee Arena/Mecca Arena (1968–1988, plus one commemorative game in the 2017–18 season)
  - Wisconsin Field House (occasional games, 1968–1975)
- Bradley Center (1988–2018)
- Fiserv Forum (2018–present)

== Radio and television ==
On July 10, 2026, the Milwaukee Bucks announced an agreement with Rincon Broadcasting Group to broadcast preseason and regular season games on WVTV-DT2 for the 2026-27 season.

From the 2007–08 to 2025-26 season, all Bucks games not nationally broadcast had aired exclusively on regional cable television over FanDuel Sports Network Wisconsin. In 2018 the Bucks agreed to a seven-year extension with the network. Since the 2023–24 NBA season, due to the bankruptcy of the parent company of FanDuel Sports Network, select games have aired instead on WMLW-TV in English and WYTU-TV in Spanish using FanDuel's production. Bucks games produced by FanDuel Sports Network are also carried on the FanDuel Sports Network app within the Bucks broadcast territory.

Prior to the Bally Sports Wisconsin exclusivity, the Bucks split their television broadcasts between Fox Sports Wisconsin (which through various incarnations have televised Bucks games since 1996) and WCGV (Channel 24) from 1999 to 2007, and prior that, WVTV (Channel 18) was the over-the-air partner from 1994 to 1999. WCGV also previously carried Bucks games from 1988 to 1994, and WVTV again, this time from 1976 to 1988; these two stations are currently owned by the Sinclair Broadcast Group, who also own Bally Sports. During each station's tenures as the over-the-air TV home of the Bucks, the telecasts consisted of almost exclusively road games; very few Bucks home games on either station were televised through the years, as the Bucks were one of the last NBA teams to televise home games regularly. The Bucks, along with their respective TV partners, co-produced and distributed the over-the-air telecasts to stations throughout Wisconsin.

In the franchise's early years, Bucks games were carried on then-ABC affiliate WITI (Channel 6), from 1968 to 1971, and on then-CBS affiliate WISN-TV (Channel 12) from 1971 to 1976; both respective runs also coincided with NBA coverage already carried by their networks at the time: ABC (1965–1973) and CBS (1973–1990). The two stations swapped networks in March 1977, with WISN since remaining with ABC, and WITI switching from CBS to Fox in December 1994.

Until his 2021 retirement, Jim Paschke was the team's television play-by-play announcer since 1986, with former Buck Jon McGlocklin providing color commentary for the team from 1976 to 2018. From 2015 to 2018, veteran announcer Gus Johnson called selected games alongside Paschke on a rotating basis. During that time, former Buck Marques Johnson also was in the booth for selected games, but became the new permanent color commentator for the 2018–19 season when the team moved to the Fiserv Forum. Veteran sportscaster Eddie Doucette served as the team's original play-by-play voice, working in that capacity from 1968 to 1984; he also called selected Bucks games on WITI, WISN-TV, and during most of WVTV's first tenure with the Bucks. He and McGlocklin also co-founded the Midwest Athletes Against Childhood Cancer (MACC) Fund in 1976, which raises money to help cancer research. In 2021, the team named Lisa Byington as their new television play-by-play announcer, making her the first woman to be the lead TV play-by-play announcer for a team in any of the four men's professional leagues.

On the radio side the team has been carried by WTMJ (620/103.3) and throughout the state on the Milwaukee Bucks Radio Network (which is sponsored by BMO Harris) for most of the team's history. Dave Koehn announces, with former Wisconsin Badgers Basketball Player Ben Brust providing color.

Preceded by New York Knicks	NBA champions 1970–71	Succeeded by Los Angeles Lakers
Preceded by Los Angeles Lakers	NBA champions 2020–21	Succeeded by Golden State Warriors
Preceded by Los Angeles Lakers	NBA Cup champions 2024	Succeeded by New York Knicks
