= NBA Executive of the Year =

National Basketball Association award

- Sport: Basketball
- League: National Basketball Association (NBA)
- Awarded for: NBA season's best executive

History
- First award: 1972–73
- Most recent: Brad Stevens (Boston Celtics)

The NBA Executive of the Year is an annual award in the National Basketball Association (NBA) award given since the 1972–73 NBA season, to the league's best general manager, president of basketball/business operations, or another high-ranking executive. Before 2009, the Executive of the Year was presented annually by Sporting News, but was officially recognized by the NBA. Since 2009, the award has been awarded by the NBA. Voting is conducted by executives from the league's 30 teams. The person with the most votes wins the award.

Since its inception, the award has been given to 28 different general managers. Jerry Colangelo, the first general manager for the Phoenix Suns, is the only person to win the award four times. Bob Bass, R. C. Buford, Wayne Embry, Bob Ferry, Stan Kasten, Jerry Krause, Bob Myers, Geoff Petrie, Jerry West, as well as Jerry Colangelo's son Bryan Colangelo, have all won the award twice. All of the award winners were born in the United States until then–Denver Nuggets general manager Masai Ujiri, who was born in England, won the award in 2013. Larry Bird, Frank Layden and Pat Riley joined Red Auerbach as the only recipients to have also received NBA Coach of the Year. Bird is also the only winner to receive the NBA Most Valuable Player in addition to either of the Coach or Executive of the Year awards.

== Winners ==
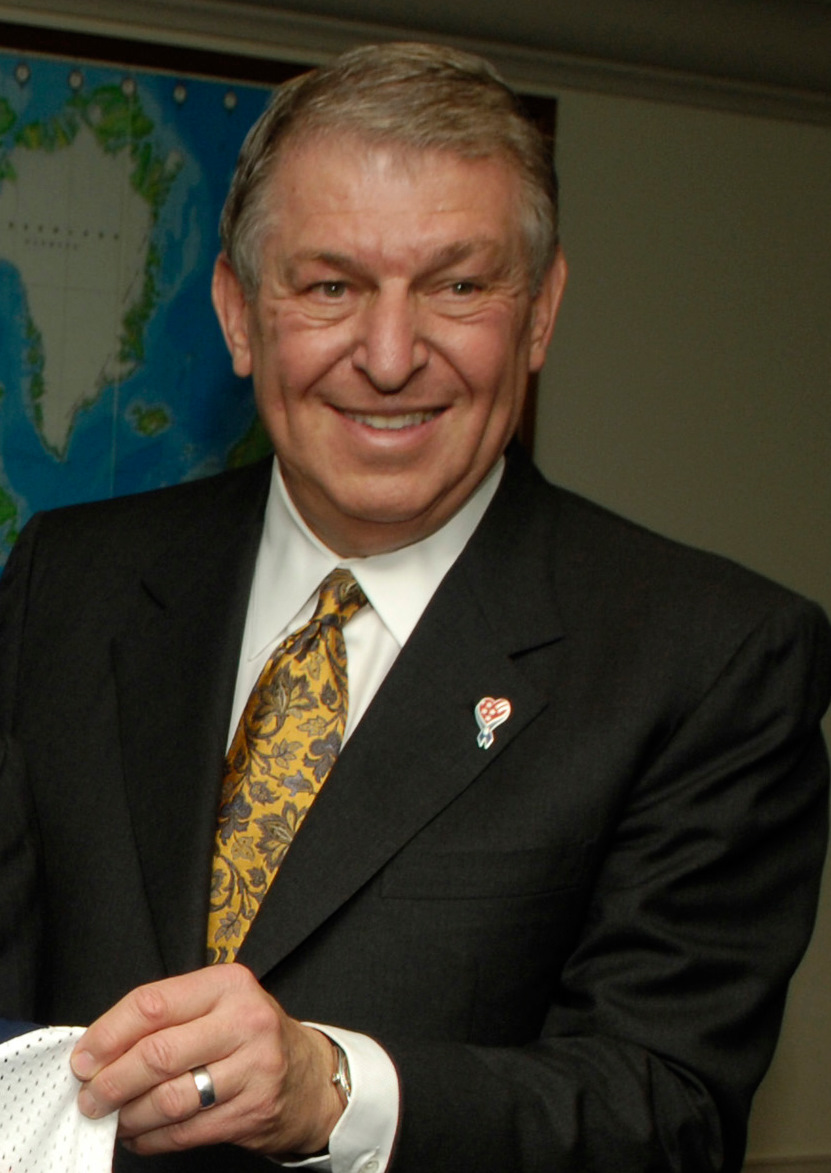
Jerry Colangelo won the award in 1976, 1981, 1989 and 1993, all with the Suns.

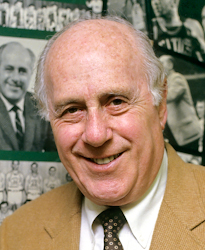
Red Auerbach won the award in 1980.

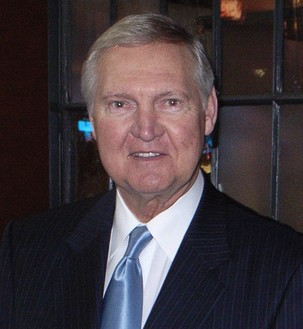
Jerry West won the award in 1995 with the Lakers and 2004 with the Grizzlies.

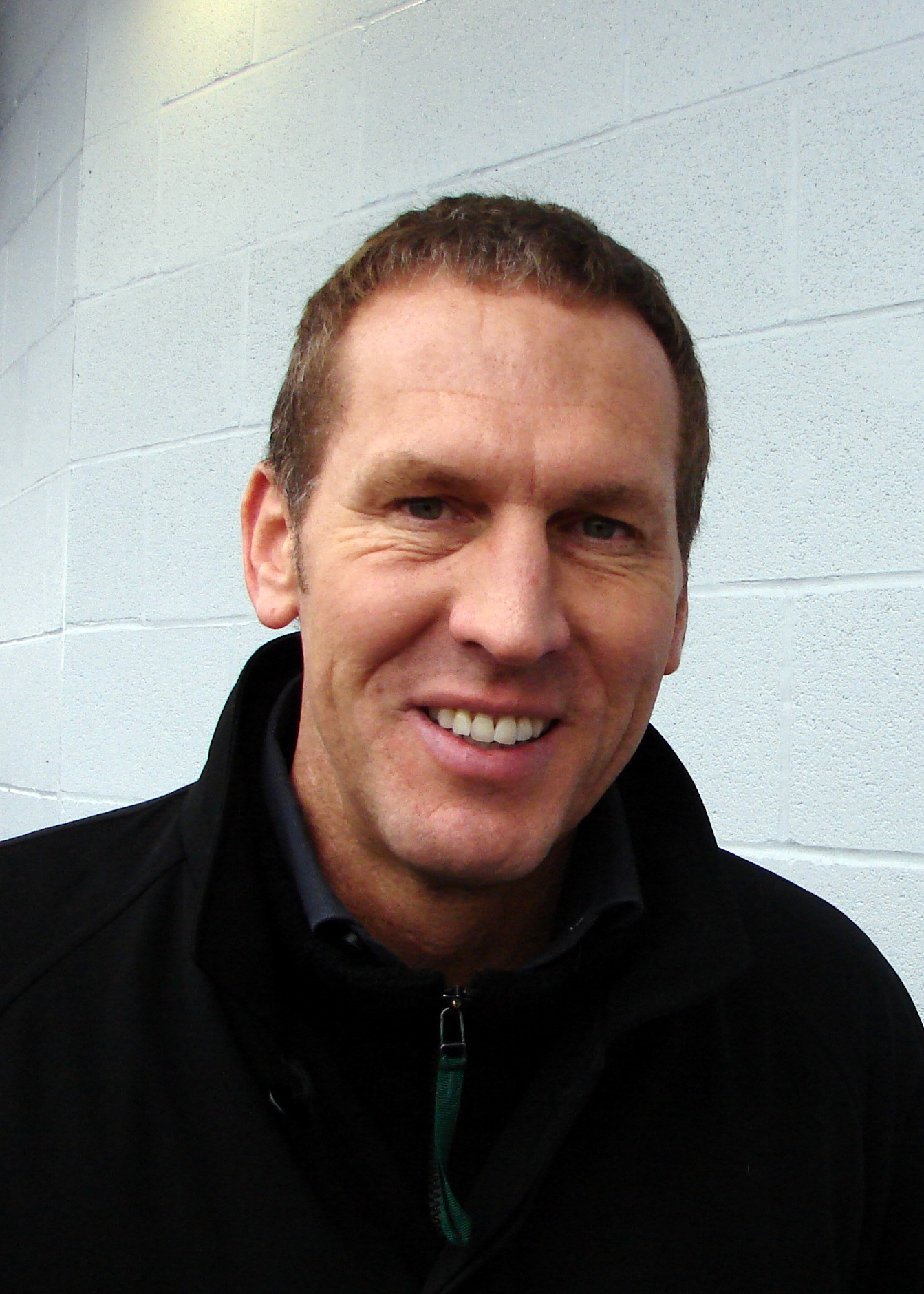
Jerry Colangelo's son, Bryan Colangelo, won the award in 2005 with the Suns and 2007 with the Raptors.

^	Denotes executive who is still active in the NBA
*	Elected to the Naismith Memorial Basketball Hall of Fame
*^	Active executive who has been elected to the Basketball Hall of Fame
**Bold**	Winning executive's team won the NBA Finals the same season
Person (#)	Denotes the number of times the executive has won the award
Team (#)	Denotes the number of times a player from this team has won

Season	Executive	Nationality	Team
1972–73	Joe Axelson	United States	Kansas City-Omaha Kings
1973–74	Eddie Donovan	United States	Buffalo Braves
1974–75	Dick Vertlieb	United States	**Golden State Warriors**
1975–76	Jerry Colangelo* (Note: Wayne Embry and Jerry Colangelo were enshrined in the Basketball Hall of Fame as contributors in 1999 and 2004.)	United States	Phoenix Suns
1976–77	Ray Patterson	United States	Houston Rockets
1977–78	Angelo Drossos	United States	San Antonio Spurs
1978–79	Bob Ferry	United States	Washington Bullets
1979–80	Red Auerbach* (Note: Red Auerbach and Pat Riley were enshrined in the Basketball Hall of Fame as coaches in 1969 and 2008.)	United States	Boston Celtics
1980–81	Jerry Colangelo* (2)	United States	Phoenix Suns (2)
1981–82	Bob Ferry (2)	United States	Washington Bullets (2)
1982–83	Zollie Volchok	United States	Seattle SuperSonics
1983–84	Frank Layden	United States	Utah Jazz
1984–85	Vince Boryla	United States	Denver Nuggets
1985–86	Stan Kasten	United States	Atlanta Hawks
1986–87	Stan Kasten (2)	United States	Atlanta Hawks (2)
1987–88	Jerry Krause*	United States	Chicago Bulls
1988–89	Jerry Colangelo* (3)	United States	Phoenix Suns (3)
1989–90	Bob Bass	United States	San Antonio Spurs (2)
1990–91	Bucky Buckwalter	United States	Portland Trail Blazers
1991–92	Wayne Embry*	United States	Cleveland Cavaliers
1992–93	Jerry Colangelo* (4)	United States	Phoenix Suns (4)
1993–94	Bob Whitsitt	United States	Seattle SuperSonics (2)
1994–95	Jerry West* (Note: Elgin Baylor, Jerry West, Larry Bird and Joe Dumars were enshrined in the Basketball Hall of Fame as players in 1977, 1980, 1998 and 2006, respectively.)	United States	Los Angeles Lakers
1995–96	Jerry Krause* (2)	United States	**Chicago Bulls** (2)
1996–97	Bob Bass (2)	United States	Charlotte Hornets
1997–98	Wayne Embry* (2)	United States	Cleveland Cavaliers (2)
1998–99	Geoff Petrie	United States	Sacramento Kings (2)
1999–00	John Gabriel	United States	Orlando Magic
2000–01	Geoff Petrie (2)	United States	Sacramento Kings (3)
2001–02	Rod Thorn*	United States	New Jersey Nets
2002–03	Joe Dumars*	United States	Detroit Pistons
2003–04	Jerry West* (2)	United States	Memphis Grizzlies
2004–05	Bryan Colangelo	United States	Phoenix Suns (5)
2005–06	Elgin Baylor*	United States	Los Angeles Clippers (2)
2006–07	Bryan Colangelo (2)	United States	Toronto Raptors
2007–08	Danny Ainge^	United States	**Boston Celtics** (2)
2008–09	Mark Warkentien	United States	Denver Nuggets (2)
2009–10	John Hammond^	United States	Milwaukee Bucks
2010–11 (Note: Denotes seasons in which joint winners were named)	Pat Riley*^	United States	Miami Heat
2010–11	Gar Forman	United States	Chicago Bulls (3)
2011–12	Larry Bird*	United States	Indiana Pacers
2012–13	Masai Ujiri^	Nigeria	Denver Nuggets (3)
2013–14	R. C. Buford^	United States	**San Antonio Spurs** (3)
2014–15	Bob Myers	United States	**Golden State Warriors** (2)
2015–16	R. C. Buford^ (2)	United States	San Antonio Spurs (4)
2016–17	Bob Myers (2)	United States	**Golden State Warriors** (3)
2017–18	Daryl Morey^	United States	Houston Rockets (2)
2018–19	Jon Horst^	United States	Milwaukee Bucks (2)
2019–20	Lawrence Frank^	United States	Los Angeles Clippers (3)
2020–21	James Jones	United States	Phoenix Suns (6)
2021–22	Zach Kleiman^	United States	Memphis Grizzlies (2)
2022–23	Monte McNair	United States	Sacramento Kings (4)
2023–24	Brad Stevens^	United States	**Boston Celtics** (3)
2024–25	Sam Presti^	United States	**Oklahoma City Thunder** (3)
2025–26	Brad Stevens^ (2)	United States	Boston Celtics (4)

== Multi-time winners ==
Awards	Executive	Team(s)	Years
4	(United States) Jerry Colangelo	Phoenix Suns	1976, 1981, 1989, 1993
2	(United States) Bob Bass	San Antonio Spurs (1) / Charlotte Hornets (1)	1990, 1997
2	(United States) R.C. Buford	San Antonio Spurs	2014, 2016
2	(United States) Bryan Colangelo	Phoenix Suns (1) / Toronto Raptors (1)	2005, 2007
2	(United States) Wayne Embry	Cleveland Cavaliers	1992, 1998
2	(United States) Bob Ferry	Washington Bullets	1979, 1982
2	(United States) Stan Kasten	Atlanta Hawks	1986, 1987
2	(United States) Jerry Krause	Chicago Bulls	1988, 1996
2	(United States) Bob Myers	Golden State Warriors	2015, 2017
2	(United States) Geoff Petrie	Sacramento Kings	1999, 2001
2	(United States) Brad Stevens	Boston Celtics	2024, 2026
2	(United States) Jerry West	Los Angeles Lakers (1) / Memphis Grizzlies (1)	1995, 2004

== Teams ==
Awards	Teams	Years
6	Phoenix Suns	1976, 1981, 1989, 1993, 2005, 2021
4	San Antonio Spurs	1978, 1990, 2014, 2016
4	Sacramento Kings / Kansas City-Omaha Kings	1973, 1999, 2001, 2023
4	Boston Celtics	1980, 2008, 2024, 2026
3	Chicago Bulls	1988, 1996, 2011
3	Denver Nuggets	1985, 2009, 2013
3	Golden State Warriors	1975, 2015, 2017
3	Los Angeles Clippers / Buffalo Braves	1974, 2006, 2020
3	Oklahoma City Thunder / Seattle SuperSonics	1983, 1994, 2025
2	Atlanta Hawks	1986, 1987
2	Cleveland Cavaliers	1992, 1998
2	Houston Rockets	1977, 2018
2	Memphis Grizzlies	2004, 2022
2	Milwaukee Bucks	2010, 2019
2	Washington Wizards / Washington Bullets	1979, 1982
1	Brooklyn Nets / New Jersey Nets	2002
1	Charlotte Hornets	1997
1	Detroit Pistons	2003
1	Indiana Pacers	2012
1	Los Angeles Lakers	1995
1	Miami Heat	2011
1	Orlando Magic	2000
1	Portland Trail Blazers	1991
1	Toronto Raptors	2007
1	Utah Jazz	1984
0	Dallas Mavericks	None
0	Minnesota Timberwolves	None
0	New Orleans Pelicans	None
0	New York Knicks	None
0	Philadelphia 76ers	None

== See also ==
- NBA records
- Sports Illustrated Best GM of the Decade (NBA) (2009)
- Sports Illustrated Top 10 GMs of the Decade (all sports)
- List of National Basketball Association general managers
- List of National Basketball Association team presidents
