= Partners for Community Impact =

Partners for Community Impact is a group of 5 five prominent African-American executives who have been involved in major civic initiatives. The five formed Partners for Community Impact to explore economic development opportunities. PCI has previously been involved in urban economic development and renewal projects.

The group is composed of:

- Valerie Daniels-Carter, president and CEO of V&J Holdings Cos., a fast-food company with 4,000 employees in five states.
- Michael J. Barber, retired Chief Operating Officer of GE Healthcare
- Virgis W. Colbert, a retired executive vice president of worldwide operations for Miller Brewing Co.
- Charles Harvey, a Johnson Controls vice president and president of the Johnson Controls Foundation
- Cory Nettles, founder and managing director of General Growth Capital.
