= John Hammond (basketball) =

American basketball executive (born 1954)

Orlando Magic
- Position: Senior advisor
- League: NBA

Personal information
- Born: July 19, 1954 (age 72) Zion, Illinois, U.S.

Career information
- College: Greenville (IL) (1972–1976)

Career history

Coaching
- 1990–1994: Los Angeles Clippers (assistant)
- 1996–2000: Detroit Pistons (assistant)
- 2000–2001: Los Angeles Clippers (assistant)

Career highlights
- As executive: NBA Executive of the Year (2010)

John Hammond (born July 19, 1954) is an American professional basketball executive who is the senior advisor to the president of basketball operations of the Orlando Magic of the National Basketball Association (NBA). Previously, Hammond had been the general manager of the Milwaukee Bucks, as well as the assistant general manager with the Detroit Pistons, where he had also worked as an assistant coach. He had also been an assistant coach with the Los Angeles Clippers, University of Missouri, University of Nebraska–Lincoln, and Houston Baptist University. He is a graduate of Greenville College. He is best known in NBA circles as the general manager who drafted NBA star Giannis Antetokounmpo to the Bucks.

Hammond won the 2010 NBA Executive of the Year Award, the first time a Bucks executive had ever won the award in the team's history. Hammond was credited with building a Bucks team that went from 34 to 46 victories in one season, including a return to the playoffs for the first time since 2006. He also was responsible for several moves he made before the 2009–10 season, such as drafting Brandon Jennings and bringing in veteran John Salmons in a trade. Both of them played key roles in the Bucks' 2009–10 season.

The Bucks had reached the NBA Playoffs three times during Hammond's seven-year tenure as general manager, yet had failed to win a playoff series. During one of those three playoff appearances, they had a losing regular season record (38–44) and were swept in the first round, losing each of the four games by an average of 15 points. During Hammond's stewardship the Bucks had posted 240 wins against 318 losses, a winning percentage of .430. The 2013–14 season for the Bucks, the franchise's 46th season, posted a franchise all-time worst record of 15 wins and 67 defeats, a winning percentage of .183, as well as featuring the worst attendance in the NBA. In January 2013, Hammond and Bucks owner Herb Kohl agreed to a three-year contract extension worth approximately $5.5 million. Kohl later sold the team in May 2014.

Despite the dismal season in 2013–14, Hammond had also built the foundation for what would become a championship team with the Bucks before that season, by drafting Giannis Antetokounmpo and making a trade with the Detroit Pistons that included future All-Star Khris Middleton. Both Antetokounmpo and Middleton became the cornerstones for the Bucks' NBA Championship team in 2021.

On May 23, 2017, it was announced that Hammond would sign a five-year deal to be the new general manager of the Orlando Magic alongside friend Jeff Weltman, thus officially ending his tenure with the Milwaukee Bucks.

In the Disney+ film about Giannis Antetokounmpo, Rise, Hammond is portrayed by Taylor Nichols.

On July 5, 2023, it was announced that Hammond was promoted to senior advisor to the president of basketball operations.
