= Glossary of basketball terms =

This glossary of basketball terms is a list of definitions of terms used in the game of basketball. Like any other major sport, basketball features its own extensive vocabulary of unique words and phrases used by players, coaches, sports journalists, commentators, and fans.

== 0–9 ==
2-for-1
A strategy used within the last minute of a period or quarter, in which the team with possession times its shot to ensure that it will regain possession with enough time to shoot again before time runs out. Applicable in competitions that use a shot clock (all except NFHS in most US states).
3-and-D
Any player, typically not a star, who specializes mainly in three-point shooting ("3") and defense ("D"). The term is most often used in the NBA, where this specific skill set has been increasingly valued in the 21st century.
3x3
A formalized version of a half-court basketball game with three players on each team, officially sanctioned by FIBA. This variant made its Olympic debut in 2021 (delayed from 2020).
three seconds rule
A rule which requires that a player shall not remain in the opponent's restricted area for more than three consecutive seconds while the player's team is in control of a live ball in the frontcourt and the game clock is running.
n-possession game
A way of expressing the number of times a team that is trailing its opponent late in the game must secure possession of the ball and score without allowing the opponent to do the same in order to tie or overtake the opponent. Normally, three points are the most possible in any given possession; therefore, the number of possessions (n) necessary is equal to the point margin, divided by three, rounded up to the nearest integer. For instance, a team down by 7 points would be in a three-possession game.

== A ==
advance step
A step in which the defender's lead foot steps toward his man and the back foot slides forward.
air ball
An unblocked shot that fails to hit the rim or backboard.
alley-oop
An offensive play in which a player throws the ball up near the basket to a teammate (or, more rarely, to themself) who then jumps, catches the ball in mid-air, and immediately scores a basket, often with a slam dunk.
alternating possession
In many rulesets, most notably FIBA, NCAA, and NFHS (U.S. high school), a rule used to settle most or all jump ball situations after the opening tipoff. In jump ball situations, or at the start of a new period of play, possession is awarded to the team whose offense is moving in the direction of the possession arrow.
amoeba defense
A defensive strategy incorporating elements of both man-to-man and zone defenses (see article for more details).
and-one
A free throw awarded to a shooter who is fouled while scoring, especially one which is made.
Asociación de Clubes de Baloncesto (ACB)
The top professional basketball league in Spain, often regarded as the second-strongest domestic league in the world, behind the NBA.
assist
A pass to a teammate who scores a basket immediately or after one dribble. Compare with secondary assist, also known as hockey assist, and contrast with screen assist.

== B ==
backdoor cut
An offensive play in which a player on the perimeter steps away from the basket, drawing the defender along, then suddenly cuts to the basket behind the defender for a pass.
backboard
A flat, rigid, vertical board situated behind the rim of the basket and to which the basket is attached. Regulation backboards are made of plexiglass or tempered glass and are rectangular in shape, 6 feet (180 cm) wide by 3.5 feet (110 cm) tall, with a 24-by-18-inch (61 by 46 cm) rectangle marked on the glass immediately above the basket.
backcourt
1. The half of the court a particular team is defending. Contrast frontcourt.
2. A team's guards, i.e. players who typically play some distance away from the basket.
backcourt violation
1. Touching the ball in the backcourt after it has entered the frontcourt and was not last touched by the other team.
2. Failure to bring the ball from the backcourt into the frontcourt within the allotted time of 8 seconds in the NBA or FIBA (previously 10) and 10 seconds in NCAA play for both men and women.
back screen
An offensive play in which a player comes from the low post to set a screen for a player on the perimeter.
ball fake

A sudden movement by the player with the ball intended to cause the defender to move in one direction, allowing the passer to pass in another direction.
ball hog
A player who frequently chooses not to pass the ball to their teammates, especially one who eschews sharing the ball in order to attempt difficult shots.
ball reversal
The passing of the ball from one side of the court to the other.
ball screen
An offensive play in which a player sets a screen on the defender guarding the player with the ball.
ball side

The half of the court (divided lengthwise) that the ball is currently on. Contrast help side.
banana cut

A wide, curving cut, as opposed to a cut that is a straight line.
bank shot
A shot that hits the backboard before hitting the rim or going through the net.
baseball pass
Passing the basketball using an overhand throw with one hand similar to a baseball pitch.
baseline

The line that marks the playing boundary at either end of the court.
baseline out-of-bounds play
The play used to return the ball to the court from outside the baseline along the opponent's basket.
basket

The goal in the game of basketball, consisting of a net suspended from a hoop 18 inches (46 cm) in diameter and 10 ft (305 cm) above the ground. In regulation contexts it is attached to a backboard.
basket cut
A cut toward the basket.
basket interference
the violation of touching the ball or the basket while the ball is on the rim; touching the ball when it is within the cylinder extending upwards from the rim; reaching up through the basket from below and touching the ball; or pulling down on the rim of the basket so that it contacts the ball before returning to its original position, or during a shot attempt.
BEEF (Balance, Eyes, Elbow, Follow Through)
A mnemonic used to teach proper shooting form.
bench
1. Substitute players sitting on the sideline.
2. The actual bench or chairs these players sit on.
benchwarmer
A player who does not play and instead sits on the bench for most if not all of a game or season.
bid thief
In U.S. college basketball, especially NCAA Division I, a team that (1) is a member of a conference with at least one team that is virtually certain to receive a bid to the men's or women's championship tournament, as applicable, regardless of performance in the conference tournament; (2) is not viewed as a viable candidate for an at-large tournament bid; but (3) nevertheless wins its conference tournament, forcing the more powerful conference member(s) into the at-large pool and thus "stealing" a bid from a team (not necessarily in that conference) that otherwise would be a credible candidate for an at-large bid.
big man/woman

Any low-post player who is physically large relative to other players, especially one who plays the position of center or power forward.
blindside screen
A screen set directly behind a defender where the player cannot see it.
block
1. To tip or deflect a shooter's shot, altering its flight so that the shot misses.
2. A violation in which a defender steps in front of a dribbler but is still moving when they collide; also called a blocking foul.
3. The small painted square on the floor next to the basket just outside the lane.
block-charge arc
The painted line near the basket which marks the boundary of the restricted area (definition 2).
block out

To maintain a better rebounding position than an opposing player by widening your stance and arms and using your body as a barrier.
board
Another name for a rebound.
bonus
Under NCAA men's rules, a team is "in the bonus" when the opposing team has accumulated seven, eight, or nine team fouls in a half, and therefore gains a one and one opportunity on each non-shooting foul. The opposing team is described as "over the limit". Under FIBA, NCAA women's, and (from 2023–24) NFHS rules, the bonus takes effect on the fifth team foul in a quarter and the "one and one" no longer exists; all subsequent non-shooting fouls result in two free throws. In the NCAA rule book, free throws in this situation are officially called bonus free throws. See also double bonus and penalty.
bounce pass
A pass that bounces once before reaching the receiver.
box-and-one
A combination defense in which four defenders play zone in a box formation and the fifth defender guards one player man-to-man.
box out
See block out.
box set
A formation in which four players align themselves as the four corners of a box. Often used for baseline out-of-bounds plays.
breakaway rim
a rim that contains a hinge and a spring so it can bend downward when a player dunks a basketball, and then snaps back into a horizontal position when the player releases it.
brick
A shot attempt that hits the rim and bounces off without hitting the backboard or going in the basket.
bricklayer
A player who repeatedly shoots bricks.
bubble
An imaginary boundary separating teams expected to receive berths in a postseason tournament from those left out of said event. Though applicable in any competition in which the number of teams playing in the postseason is less than the total number of teams competing, it is most commonly used in reference to the NCAA Division I men's and women's championship tournaments.
bump the cutter
To step in the way of a player who is trying to cut to the ball for a pass.
buzzer beater
A basket that is scored with zero seconds on the game clock (released right before the buzzer sounds), especially one which results in a win or a tie that leads to overtime play.

== C ==
carrying

A violation in formal play which occurs when an offensive player holds the ball excessively at the ball's apex while dribbling. In formal play, this penalty is considered either a "carry" or a double dribble.
center (C)
One of three standard player positions or five total positions in the game of basketball. Centers are generally the tallest players on the floor, responsible mainly for scoring, rebounding, and defense near the basket.
charge
An offensive foul which occurs when a player with the ball rushes into a non-moving defender.
charity stripe
Another name for the free-throw line.
cheat
To position oneself defensively near a particular area in anticipation of a play in that area.
cherry picking
Cherry picking is a strategy whereby one player (the "cherry picker") decides not to play defense and instead stays near their opponent's goal, with the primary objective being to receive the ball from their teammates for easier points.
chest pass
A pass that is made from one player to another player's chest, especially by forcefully pushing the ball away from the chest with both hands.
chucker
A player who takes frequent, and often imprudent, shot attempts. The term was popularized by the television series Seinfeld. See also gunner.
circus shot
A low-percentage shot, generally from close range, taken while the shooter is off balance, falling, facing away from the basket or otherwise out of control. Successful circus shots require exceptional luck.
clear-path foul
A foul which occurs when a defender fouls an opponent when the opponent has nobody in front of them. The foul results in two free throws and possession. Contrast with Euro foul.
combo forward
A player with the skills or qualities of both a small forward and a power forward.
cornerman
See forward.
crossover
A dribble from one hand to the ground to the other hand, accompanied by a change in direction.

== D ==
dagger

A made shot, sometimes a three-pointer, in a pivotal part of the game; e.g. a shot that silences a rowdy crowd, puts the team ahead in the closing moments of a game, discourages the opposing team, or kills their confidence.
dead-ball rebound
A rebound that is not credited to either team, such as a rebound that (technically) occurs after a miss on the first free throw of a two-shot foul. It ensures that every missed shot has a corresponding rebound, and was introduced for the purposes of box score statistical error detection.
dime
See drop a dime.
dish
Another name for an assist.
disqualifying foul
In FIBA and NCAA women's rules, an especially egregious foul, almost always involving violence or other excessive physical contact, that is punished by immediate ejection; equivalent to the NBA's flagrant-2.
DNP-CD
Stands for "did not play - coach's decision". It refers to cases where a player was available to play in a game but did not play. It does not refer to cases where a player missed the game due to injury or suspension. Additionally, it does not always mean a player is being punished by the coach. Some end of the bench players may be a DNP-CD for many games during the season. It could also be that an injured player is made active for the game but only comes in in the event of an emergency.
donut
A zero point performance by a player with considerable time on the court.
double bonus
In NCAA men's rules, a team is "in the double bonus" when the opposing team has accumulated 10 or more team fouls in a half, and therefore earns two free throws on each subsequent non-shooting foul committed by the defense. It had previously been part of the NCAA women's and NFHS rule sets, but the NCAA eliminated it from women's play in 2015–16 and NFHS followed suit for 2023–24. The term "double bonus" is widely used by the media and fans, but does not appear in any official rule book. See also bonus and penalty.
double-double
Double-digit figures in two positive statistical categories, especially when achieved by an individual player (e.g. 12 points and 14 rebounds).
double dribble
To dribble the ball with two hands at the same time, or to dribble, stop, and then begin to dribble again. Either act is a violation of the rules and results in a loss of possession.
double nickel
To accumulate 55 points.
down screen
When an offensive player runs to the baseline closest to their goal to set a screen.
downtown
Well beyond the three-point line.
draft-and-stash
Describes a player from a professional league outside of North America drafted by an NBA or WNBA team with the intent of having said player continue to play overseas, with the possibility of being brought over by the drafting team.
dribble drive motion
An offense that spreads players to open up the lane for a driving player to make a layup or kick out for a three-pointer.
dribble
To bounce the ball continuously with one hand. Dribbling is required in order to take steps while in possession of the ball; failing to do so properly is a violation of the rules in all rulesets used in the game.
drop a dime
To make an assist.
drop step
A post-up move where the ballhandler picks up their dribble and at the same time extends a leg back on one side of their defender, and then turns toward the basket, using that leg as leverage to get between their defender and the basket.
dunk

1. To score by putting the ball directly through the basket with one or both hands, i.e. without shooting by letting the ball travel through the air.
2. Any shot made by dunking.

== E ==
Elam Ending
A method of ending basketball games by reaching a specified target score, devised by Ball State University professor Nick Elam and currently used in The Basketball Tournament, the NBA All-Star Game, the Canadian Elite Basketball League, and the NBA G League. In the TBT implementation, upon the first dead ball on or after the 4:00 mark in the final quarter, 8 points (originally 7, but changed for the 2019 edition) are added to the score of the leading team, which becomes the target score. The game then continues without a game clock but with the shot clock, and the first team to reach or exceed the target score wins. In the NBA ASG implementation, the first three quarters proceed normally. Then, the target score is set by adding 24 points to the score of the leading team, and the game continues as in the TBT implementation. The CEBL implements the Elam Ending at the same point as in TBT, but adds 9 points to set the target score; additionally, if the dead-ball situation that triggers the Elam Ending results in free throws for either team, the free throws are taken under dead-ball conditions before the target score is set. Starting with the 2022–23 season, the G League uses the Elam Ending in two situations. First, in all regular-season games, overtime is played under Elam Ending conditions, with the target score set by adding 7 points to the tied teams' score at the end of regulation. Second, games in the G League Showcase, a special event held in December, operate identically to the NBA ASG, except that the target score is set by adding 25 points instead of 24. The Unrivaled women's league uses the Elam Ending, calling it "winning score"; it adds 11 points to the score of the leading team (or tied teams) at the end of the third quarter to determine the target score.
elbow
1. An actual or attempted strike of another player with one's elbow. Especially violent examples are typically called as flagrant fouls.
2. The court area where the free-throw line meets the side of the three-second lane.
end of quarter
When a quarter ends.
English
Sidespin applied to the basketball by a player shooting a layup. Analogy taken from the cue sports term.
Euro foul
A foul committed by a defender who is between the opponent and the defending team's basket in the early phase of a fast break, with the intent of stopping play. Contrast with clear-path foul.
Euro step
A move in which an offensive player picks up their dribble, takes a step in one direction, and then quickly takes a second step in another direction.
EuroBasket
A European international basketball tournament, held every two years for both men and women; analogous to the men's UEFA European Championship and UEFA Women's Championship.
EuroCup
Europe's second-level transnational club competition, operated by Euroleague Basketball; analogous to the UEFA Europa League in association football.
EuroLeague
Europe's top transnational club competition, also operated by Euroleague Basketball; analogous to the UEFA Champions League in association football.

== F ==
fadeaway
A fadeaway or fall-away in basketball is a jump shot taken while jumping backwards, away from the basket but still facing it. The goal is to create space between the shooter and the defender, making the shot much harder to block.
fast break
An offensive tactic in which a team attempts to advance the ball and score as quickly as possible, giving the other team no time to defend effectively. Often the result of a steal or blocked shot. See also secondary break.
FIBA
The International Basketball Federation, known as FIBA from its French name Fédération Internationale de Basketball. An association of national organizations which governs international competitions.
FIBA 33
The original name of what is now called 3x3.
field goal
A shot made or attempted from anywhere on the court (including layups and dunks but not including free throws).
finger roll
A specialized type of layup shot where the ball is rolled off the tips of the player's fingers using the momentum of the jump. The advantage of the finger roll is that the ball can travel in a higher arc over a defender that might otherwise block the shot.
flagrant foul
An unsportsmanlike foul in which there is no serious attempt to play the ball. The NBA classifies these types of fouls as flagrant-1 and flagrant-2; NFHS (high school) uses flagrant personal foul and flagrant technical foul; NCAA men's basketball uses both sets of terms interchangeably; and FIBA and NCAA women's basketball instead use unsportsmanlike foul and disqualifying foul (which roughly correspond to the two North American subcategories). At all North American levels, the latter type of foul results in the immediate ejection of the offender.
floater
A shot in which the ball is released with an extremely high arc in order to prevent taller defenders from blocking the shot. It is typically utilized by smaller guards.
flop
A deliberate or exaggerated fall by a player after little or no physical contact from an opponent, with the goal of drawing a personal foul call against the opponent.
forward (F)
One of three standard player positions or five total positions in the game of basketball. Forwards are primarily responsible for scoring and rebounding. See small forward and power forward. An individual capable of playing both types of forward is often called a stretch four.
foul
A violation of the rules other than a floor violation, generally one which attempts to gain advantage by physical contact. Such violations are penalized by a change in possession or the awarding of free-throw opportunities. There are many different types of fouls; see personal foul, technical foul, flagrant foul, unsportsmanlike foul, and disqualifying foul.
foul in
See and-one.
four-point play
A rare play in which a player is fouled while making a three-point field goal and then makes the resulting free throw, thereby scoring a total of four points.
free throw
An unopposed attempt to score a basket, worth one point, from the free-throw line. Generally, two attempts are awarded when the player is fouled in the act of shooting (three attempts are awarded in the case of a three-point shot), fouled flagrantly, or when the opposing team fouls while over the foul limit. For technical fouls, FIBA rules award one free throw; NBA and NFHS rules award two free throws; and NCAA rules award either one or two free throws, depending on the specific type of technical foul. In 3x3 rules, where regular baskets are worth 1 point and shots from behind the arc are worth 2 points, one attempt is normally awarded; two attempts are awarded when a player is fouled on a missed shot from behind the arc, the opposing team has committed more than six fouls in a game, and on any technical foul.
free-throw line

The line from which free throws are made.
frontcourt
1. The half of the court a particular team is attacking. Contrast backcourt.
2. A team's center and forwards, i.e. players who typically play close to the basket.
full-court press
A defensive style in which the defense applies pressure to the offensive team the entire length of the court before and after the inbound pass.

== G ==
get back
To retreat back across the half-court line after either a made or missed shot attempt. Usually called out by players or coaches to let the team know to hustle back and set up on defense.
goaltending
The violation of interfering with the ball while it is on its way to the basket and it is in a downward flight, above the basket ring and within the imaginary cylinder, and/or not touching the rim.
granny shot
An underhand shot. Can describe a shot taken using only one hand, usually thrown by older women, or one using both hands, most notably used by Rick Barry for free throws.
gravity
Description of situations in which players off the ball draw defenders to them, based on their established shooting ability. Such a player is said to have gravity on offense.
Grinnell System
A combined offensive and defensive system created by David Arseneault, head coach at Grinnell College. A variation of the run-and-gun style, its most unusual feature is that entire five-player units are usually substituted every 45 to 90 seconds, as in an ice hockey shift.
guard (G)
One of three standard player positions or five total positions in the game of basketball. Guards are typically classified in two broad categories: point guards have strong ballhandling and passing skills and are typically used to run the offense, while shooting guards, as the name implies, are generally the team's best shooters and are very often the leading scorers on their teams. Some players, often referred to as combo guards, combine features of both types.
gunner
Someone who shoots the ball too many times. See also chucker.

== H ==
half-court line
The line dividing the two sides of the court.
half-court offense
The portion of a team's offensive play conducted with both teams having established positions. See also transition offense.
halftime
1. The end of the first half of play.
2. The interval between the two halves of a game.
hand-check foul
A kind of foul wherein a player used their hands illegally to impede or slow the movement of the opponent.
hang time
The time a player spends in the air from the liftoff of a jump to the landing of the jump.
heating up
When a player starts to make the majority of their shots and takes over the game.
held ball
A situation when players from both teams claim possession of the basketball at the same time without a foul from either team. Depending on the league and the game situation, may result in a jump ball, a change in possession, or an out-of-bounds play by the team that previously had possession.
high post
The area of the court at the top of the key on either end of the free throw line.
hockey assist
See secondary assist.
hook shot
A shot attempt made with a single hand swinging in an arc over the head or shoulders while in motion. Contrast with a regular shot normally taken facing the basket
hoop
Another name for the basket.

== I ==
I got back
To be in the back of the court ready to block or shoot.
in-n-out
1. A shot that appears to be going in, but instead goes back out.
2. A dribble move where the offensive player dribbles in an inward motion then backs out to fake out a defender.
index rating
See Performance Index Rating.
intentional foul
To deliberately foul an opposing player to either stop the clock and/or to get possession of the ball after free throw attempts. A common strategy toward the end of the first half or the end of the game.
isolation

An offensive tactic where the ballhandler moves to one side of the court while all the other offensive players move to the far side. The offense seeks to create a favorable one-on-one matchup for the isolated ballhandler, or else to draw a double-team that may create an open shot for a teammate.

== J ==
jump shot

A jump shot is an overhead shot taken while jumping.
jump ball
The jump ball is what starts every basketball game, except in 3x3. Takes place in the center of the court.

== K ==
KenPom
A predictive metric for NCAA men's basketball developed by Ken Pomeroy; one of several such metrics used in the selection process for the Division I tournament.
key
The free-throw lane and free-throw circle are together known as the key.
kicking
A violation called when a player intentionally uses their foot or leg to contact the ball. Play is stopped and the ball is given to the non-violating team to inbound.
kickout
A pass from the paint area to a shooter outside the three-point arc.

== L ==
lane
The free-throw lane.
lay-in
A close-range shot using one hand to tip the ball over the rim of the basket.
layup
A close-range shot using one hand to bank the ball off the backboard and into the basket.
ledgie
When a ball gets stuck on the ledge at the back of the rim of the basket.
logo three
A three-point field goal attempted from or near the mid-court center circle, on which the logo of the home team, venue, league, or event is usually placed. Also referred to as "from the logo."
loose ball foul
To foul an opposing player when neither team has control of the ball. As an example, fouling an opposing player when both players are chasing a loose ball
low post
The area of the court around the basket on either side of the bottom of the key.

== M ==
man-to-man defense
A defense in which each player guards a single opposing player. Contrast zone defense.
Memphis Attack
Another name for the dribble drive motion. The offense was popularized in the early 2000s at the University of Memphis under head coach John Calipari.
mid-range
Describes a shot taken from outside the paint but inside the three-point line.
motion offense
Offense created through a series of cuts and screens to create the best possible shot, with most or all offensive players moving simultaneously.
moving violation
Another name for a traveling violation.

== N ==
National Basketball Association (NBA)
The largest men's professional basketball league in the United States and Canada.
National Collegiate Athletic Association (NCAA)
The primary governing body for intercollegiate sports in the United States. The NCAA organizes annual national championship tournaments for all three of its competitive divisions in college basketball, with the Division I men's and women's tournaments being by far the most followed.
National Federation of State High School Associations (NFHS)
The governing body that sets rules for high school sports in the U.S., including basketball.
National Invitation Tournament (NIT)
An annual postseason tournament for NCAA Division I men's basketball teams that do not qualify for the NCAA championship tournament. Founded in 1938, a year before the NCAA tournament, it is closely identified with New York City; all games were originally held at the third Madison Square Garden, and the semifinals and final were held at today's Madison Square Garden through 2022. In its early years, it was considered more prestigious than the NCAA tournament, but this changed starting in the 1950s. The tournament has been directly operated by the NCAA since 2006.
NBA G League

The NBA's official minor league.
NCAA Evaluation Tool

A metric developed by the NCAA for use in the selection process for the Division I men's tournament, beginning in 2019. It was extended to the D-I women's tournament effective in 2021.
Nellie Ball
An unconventional offensive strategy developed by NBA head coach Don Nelson. It is an offense that relies on two things: (1) smaller, more athletic players who can create mismatches by outrunning their opponents, and (2) a strong emphasis on three-point shooting, which is generally a staple of the offense. A true center is not needed to run Nellie Ball, although this strategy is most effective against teams that do not have the athleticism or shooting ability to keep up with the fast pace of the offense.
no shot during the violation
A player accidentally shoots the ball into the net when a violation is triggered.
no-charge semicircle
FIBA's term for the restricted area (definition 2).

== O ==
O Boards
Offensive rebound. Grabbing the rebound by an offensive player.
offensive foul
A foul committed by an offensive player.
offensive rebound
The team that last shot the ball regains control of the ball on a rebound.
off the ball
Refers to the actions of players who are not currently handling the ball.
one-and-done
A player expected to declare themselves eligible for the NBA draft after a single season in college.
one-and-one
In NCAA men's rules, a free-throw attempt which, if made, allows the player a second free-throw attempt. This rule previously existed in NCAA women's and NFHS play, respectively being eliminated in 2015 and 2023. See also bonus.
one trillion
A box score showing one minute played and zero for all other statistics, resulting in a one followed by twelve zeros – the conventional American rendering of the number one trillion.
outlet pass
A pass thrown by a rebounder to start a fast break.
over-and-back
See backcourt violation.
over the back
A foul committed by a player who tries to rebound the ball by pushing, moving, or climbing on the back of a player who is already in position to rebound the ball.
overtime
When the score is tied at the end of regulation play, the teams play an extra period, normally five minutes in length (four minutes in the NFHS) to determine the winner. Not normally utilized in 3x3 and leagues and tournaments that employ the Elam Ending to end games (e.g. The Basketball Tournament, Canadian Elite Basketball League, the NBA G League's regular season, and Unrivaled).

== P ==
pack
To roughly hit down a ball that an opposing player has just released for a shot. See also swat.
pack-line defense
A man-to-man defensive system in which one player pressures the ball and the other four "pack" down within an imaginary "line" extending to about 2 feet (60 cm) inside the three-point arc, with the intent of preventing dribble penetration. The system, derived from a number of other man-to-man systems, was developed by Dick Bennett, and has been popularized in the 21st century by coaches including his son Tony, Chris Mack, and Sean Miller.
paint
Another name for the key, often referring only to the painted area below the free-throw line.
palming
Specifically referring to the habit of an offensive player to hold the ball at the apex of its bounce while dribbling, usually by gripping the ball firmly in the dribbling hand. In organized play this is always considered a dribbling penalty, often called a carry or double dribble. In non-organized play this is typically considered rude and is generally discouraged by the defensive players.
pass
1. To throw or bounce the ball to a teammate.
2. The act of passing to a teammate.
pass and chase
1. To pass the ball to another teammate and immediately follow the pass to either pick and roll, slip by, accept a handoff back, or other basketball moves.
Performance Index Rating
A player rating originally used by Liga ACB to determine weekly and season MVPs and later adopted by Euroleague Basketball to determine the same awards in the EuroLeague and EuroCup. No longer used to determine season MVPs in the EuroLeague and EuroCup, but still used for weekly awards, and also used by many other European domestic leagues. It is calculated from statistics available in standard European box scores by adding the numerical values for a player's recorded points, assists, rebounds, blocks, steals, fouls drawn, free throws made, 2-point field goals made, and 3-point field goals made, and subtracting turnovers, own shots blocked, fouls committed, free throw attempts, 2-point field goal attempts, and 3-point field goal attempts.
perimeter
The area outside the key but well inside the three-point arc.
Philippine Basketball Association (PBA)
A professional basketball league in the Philippines. It is the second oldest professional basketball league in the world after the NBA.
pick
See screen.
pick and roll
An offensive play in which a player sets a screen (pick) for a teammate handling the ball and then slips behind the defender (rolls) to accept a pass.
Pinoy step
A move in which an offensive player dribbles towards the basket, does a pump fake, then proceeds to make an actual shot after the last remaining legal step.
pivot
The pivot center, or to lightly pick up one foot and spin with the next so as to avoid traveling.
pivot foot
The foot that must remain touching the floor to avoid traveling.
player control foul
A foul which occurs when the player with the ball crashes into a defender; sometimes incorrectly referred to as a charge.
pocket pass
A skillful pass through a narrow gap in the defense, especially to complete a pick and roll play.
point forward
A forward with strong ballhandling and passing skills who can be called upon to direct the team's offense.
point guard (PG)
Player whose main responsibilities are ballhandling, passing and directing the team's offense. Often the shortest player on the floor.
points in the paint
Field goals made in the painted area below the free-throw line.
positionless basketball
A concept of roster construction and game play in which most or all key players regularly switch positions, often during games.
possession arrow
A physical or electronic arrow at the scorer's table that determines the next possession under the alternating possession rule. After the opening jump ball, it is set to point in the direction in which the team that lost the jump ball is moving on offense, and is switched each time the alternating possession rule is invoked.
post up
To go in or near the key, turn so that you are facing away from the basket but towards a teammate who has the ball, and try to establish position to receive a pass.
power forward (PF)
Usually the second-tallest player on the court. Plays a similar role to the center.
prayer
A shot that has very little probability of being made, usually a three-point attempt from a long distance behind the arc.
Princeton offense
An offensive basketball strategy which emphasizes constant motion, passing, backdoor cuts, picks on and off the ball, and disciplined teamwork. Used and perfected at Princeton University, it is especially designed for a unit of five players who can each pass, shoot, and dribble at an above-average level.
prioritization
A clause in recent WNBA collective bargaining agreements, first appearing in the 2020 CBA and retained in the 2026 edition. Since 2023, this clause has severely penalized veteran players who report late to training camp. The expectation is that WNBA players will make that league their priority.
pump fake
For an offensive player to start a shooting motion without their feet leaving the floor and then to quickly stop. The intent is gain an advantage if the feet of an over-eager defensive player leaves the floor
putback dunk
A dunk performed in the air during an offensive rebound.

== Q ==
quadruple-double
Double-digit figures in four positive statistical categories, especially when achieved by an individual player (e.g. 10 points, 10 rebounds, 10 assists, and 10 steals).
quintuple-double
Double-digit figures in five positive statistical categories, especially when achieved by an individual player (e.g. 10 points, 10 rebounds, 10 assists, 10 blocks, and 10 steals).

== R ==
rainbow shot
A perfect high shot arc on a shot that goes in, usually resulting from a fluent shooting motion and usually on a long shot attempt.
rating percentage index (RPI)
A tool long used by the NCAA in the selection process for its Division I men's and women's tournaments. Replaced for both tournaments by the NET—men's in 2019, women's in 2021.
rebound
1. To obtain the ball after a missed field goal attempt.
2. The act of rebounding.
rejected
To have one's shot blocked.
restricted area
1. An alternate term for the free-throw lane.
2. An area within the free-throw lane, designated by a semicircle in front of the basket, in which contact fouls involving a driving offensive player and a stationary defender are by rule called as a blocking foul on the defender (with limited exceptions in the NBA rule set). Called the "no-charge semicircle" in the FIBA rules.
rim
1. The physical rim on a basketball goal.
2. The area immediately surrounding the basket, often defined in shot charts as either the restricted area (definition 2) or a circle around the basket whose diameter matches the width of the free-throw lane.
rim protection
Defense in the area closest to the rim.
rimshot
A toss in which the ball hits the rim of the basket.
rip a C
A motion used while chinning the ball to create space during a pivot between an offensive player and a defensive player. Pivot towards the defender and rips the ball in a C-shape away from the pressure to create a passing lane.
rock
Another name for the basketball.
role player
A player who is not one of the best players on the team, but still makes a meaningful contribution. Common roles include the shooting specialist, the defensive specialist, the 3-and-D player, the rebounding specialist, the score-first sixth man, and the floor general.
run
An interval in which one team heavily outscores the other.
run and gun
A combined offensive and defensive system devoted to increasing the pace of the game. On offense, the ball is moved upcourt as fast as possible, with the goal of taking the first shot available (often a three-pointer). The defense uses full-court pressure in an attempt to cause turnovers. See also Grinnell System.

== S ==
screen

1. To attempt to prevent a defender from guarding a teammate by standing in the defender's way. The screening player must remain stationary; a moving screen is an offensive foul.
2. The tactic of setting a screen.
screen assist
Awarded when a player sets a screen for a teammate that directly results in that teammate making a basket. While not appearing in standard box scores, it is recorded in the NBA, and is one of the statistics that league uses in determining the recipient of its annual Hustle Award.
secondary assist

A pass to a teammate who in turn immediately (within 1 second in the NBA) makes a second pass that results in a basket, awarding the second player an assist. While not appearing in standard box scores, these are recorded in the NBA and several other leagues. The alternate term "hockey assist" comes from the ice hockey practice of awarding assists not only to the player whose pass leads immediately to a goal, but also to the teammate who made the next-to-last pass in the sequence.
secondary break
An offensive phase after an initial fast break is stopped but before the opponent can enter into its set defense.
set shot
A shot taken without the shooter's feet leaving the floor (i.e. without jumping).
shooting guard (SG)
One of the five positions in basketball. The shooting guard is generally the team's best scorer and the second-shortest player.
shot clock
A timer designed to increase the pace (and, consequently, the frequency of scoring) by requiring a shot to be released before the timer expires; if the ball does not touch the rim or enter the basket, a shot-clock violation is called, which results in a loss of possession for the shooting team. The time limit is 12 seconds in 3x3; 18 seconds in Unrivaled; 24 seconds in the NBA, WNBA, and FIBA play; 30 seconds in both men's and women's NCAA play; and 35 seconds in states that use a shot clock for NFHS play. See also air ball.
sixth man/woman/player
1. A player who does not start the game but is nonetheless an important player and is generally the first player off the bench, and who often has statistics comparable to those of starters.
2. A superfan who believes that their fervent support of a team will have a direct influence on the outcome of a game that the team may be involved in; comparable to the twelfth man in various football codes and cricket.
slasher
A player who primarily drives, or "slashes," to the basket when on offense.
small forward (SF)
One of the five positions in basketball. Small forwards are generally the most versatile players and typically the third-tallest on the floor.
splash
Occurs when a player makes a shot in which the ball does not touch the backboard or the rim of the basket (a "swish").
split-action
Utilizes a post and two perimeter players (one with the ball); the ball-handler passes-in to the post player then immediately moves to set a screen for/receive a screen from the second perimeter player. The post passes the ball out to the free perimeter player for a shot-attempt
steal
To gain possession of the ball from the opposing team by intercepting a pass, knocking the ball off a dribble, or slapping it legally out of an opponent's hands
step back
A move in which a player that has the ball in the mid-range takes one step back to shoot a three-pointer.
stretch five
A center ("5") capable of "stretching" a defense with their outside shooting ability. Analogous to the stretch four, this positional hybrid has emerged mainly in the NBA in the 2010s.
stretch four
A power forward ("4") capable of "stretching" a defense with their outside shooting ability.
stripe

The free-throw line.
stroking the tres
Making a three point shot.
swingman
A player capable of playing either the shooting guard or small forward positions.
swat
To deflect an opposing player's shot off course so that it misses completely. See also pack.
swish

1. A shot which goes through the net without hitting the rim of the basket, and generally without hitting the backboard either (though there is some disagreement about the requirement of the latter).
2. To make a shot in such a manner.
switch
A style of defense in which match-ups change often rather than being set for an entire quarter or game. In its extreme form, this can mean that the offensive player that a defensive player is guarding changes multiple times within one possession. The switch is often employed against an offense that relies on a pick and roll strategy.

== T ==
technical foul

A foul assessed for unsportsmanlike behavior that does not involve physical contact and for some procedural violations (for example, having too many players on the court or calling a timeout when none remain). Technical fouls are penalized by loss of possession after a free throw, which may be taken by any member of the opposing team.
The Basketball Tournament (TBT)
A single-elimination tournament, currently involving 64 teams, held in the U.S. during the NBA offseason, currently with a $1 million winner-take-all purse.
three-point field goal

A shot worth three points that must be attempted with both feet behind the three-point line.
three-point play
1. A play in which a shooter is fouled while making a standard two-point field goal and then makes the resulting free throw, such that a total of three points is scored. See also and one.
2. (rarely) A play in which a shooter is fouled while taking but missing a three-point field goal and then makes all three resulting free throws.
three-pointer
Another name for a three-point field goal.
throw-in foul
A category of personal foul created by FIBA in 2022, defined as a foul committed during the last 2 minutes of any playing period (quarter or overtime) by a defensive player during a throw-in, but before the thrower releases the ball. Penalized by 1 free throw and possession, regardless of the current penalty situation.
toilet bowl
When the ball hits the rim of the basket at a certain angle and then circles around it before going in or out.
transition defense
The portion of a team's defensive play conducted when the other team has first gained possession and is moving up the court, before both teams have established positions; this includes defense against fast breaks. See also halfcourt defense.
transition offense
The portion of a team's offensive play conducted when first obtaining possession from the other team and moving up the court, before both teams have established positions; this includes fast breaks. See also halfcourt offense.
travel
To move one's pivot foot illegally, to fall to the floor without maintaining a pivot foot, or to take three or more steps without dribbling the ball. Such violations are referred to as traveling; the precise rules regarding the infraction vary by ruleset.
trey
Another name for a three-point field goal.
triangle offense
An offensive strategy with the goal of exchanging three (sometimes all five) positions, creating spacing among players and allowing each one to pass to four teammates. The most important feature of the triangle offense is the sideline triangle created by the center in the low post, a forward at the wing, and a guard at the corner; the other guard stands at the top of the key and the weak-side forward on the weak-side high post, together forming the "two-man game". Every pass and cut has a purpose, and each is dictated by the movements of the opposing defense.
trillion
A statistic formed by a player playing some number of minutes, but recording no stats. Coined by Harvey Pollack, because of the way the numbers read across a basketball box score.
triple-double
Double-digit figures in three positive statistical categories in a single game, especially when achieved by an individual player (e.g. 10 points, 10 rebounds, and 10 assists).
triple-single
An individual player posting single-digit figures in the three principal statistical categories of points, rebounds and assists during a single game. Popularized and possibly coined by Charles Barkley in reference to Draymond Green.
true road game
In U.S. college basketball, a game played by a particular team on an opponent's home court, or sometimes a larger venue in that opponent's home area in which the opponent controls ticket sales. This distinction has been drawn in the 21st century because of an increasing number of early-season events—both individual games and tournaments—held in locations at which neither team can be considered to have any significant home-court advantage, known as neutral sites.
turnover
A loss of possession, either during ordinary play or as the result of a penalty for an infraction of the rules.
tweener
A term, sometimes used derisively, for a player who is able to play two positions, but is not ideally suited to play either position exclusively. A tweener has a set of skills that do not match the traditional position of the player's physical stature.

== U ==
UCLA High Post Offense
An offensive strategy used by UCLA head coach John Wooden. Due to the program's immense success under Wooden's guidance, this offense has become one of the most popular offensive tactics in basketball. Elements of it are commonly used at all levels of the game, including in the NBA.
Uncontested shot
A shot in which the shooter has no one contesting or interfering with the shot. It encompasses shots from a layup, a slam dunk, and jump shots.
Union of European Leagues of Basketball (ULEB)
A cooperative organization of European professional basketball leagues which operated the Euroleague and Eurocup before handing responsibility to the Euroleague Basketball Company.
Unrivaled
A U.S.-based women's professional league playing 3-on-3 basketball on a compressed full court. Began play in 2025 with the explicit intent to allow WNBA players to play professionally in the U.S. during the traditional basketball season.
unsportsmanlike foul
(FIBA and NCAA women's) An egregious foul involving excessive physical contact, fouling with no intention to make a play on the ball, or fouling an opponent on a breakaway from behind. In NCAA women's play, this category also includes contact dead-ball technical fouls. It is roughly equivalent to the NBA's flagrant-1.
up and down
A traveling violation which occurs when the ball carrier jumps vertically into the air and does not release it before landing.

== V ==
vertical jump
The act of raising one's center of gravity higher in the vertical plane solely with the use of one's own muscles; it is a measure of how high an individual athlete can elevate off the ground from a standstill.
violation
An infraction of the rules other than a foul, such as traveling or a three-second violation.
V-cut
A move where a player moves to the player defending them, then quickly turns and receives the ball; used to fake the defender.

== W ==
walk
To walk without dribbling the ball.
wedgie
When the basketball gets stuck between the rim and backboard.
wing
1. An area located on either side of the court, outside the three-second lane, along an imaginary extension of the free-throw line.
2. A swingman, especially one who generally operates from the above area on offense.
wins above bubble (WAB)
A metric introduced to the NCAA Division I tournament selection process in 2025 that compares a team's accomplishment against its schedule in that season to the predicted record that an average bubble team would have recorded against that same schedule.
Women's Basketball Invitation Tournament (WBIT)
A secondary postseason tournament for NCAA Division I women's teams, held for the first time in 2023–24. The NCAA operates it as a direct parallel to the men's NIT.
Women's National Basketball Association (WNBA)

The largest professional basketball league for women in the United States.
Women's National Invitation Tournament (WNIT)
A tournament for NCAA Division I women's teams, with both preseason and postseason versions. The preseason version was founded in 1994, and the postseason version was founded in 1998. The latter includes teams that do not qualify for the NCAA championship tournament. Before the 1998–99 season, both events were known as the National Women's Invitational Tournament, inheriting the name of a similar postseason event that operated from 1969 to 1996. Despite the name, the WNIT has no relation to the men's NIT—it is not operated by the NCAA, and was never under the control of any of the bodies that ran the men's NIT before 2006.

== Z ==
zone
Short name for the painted area of the key, between the baseline and the free-throw line.
zone defense
A defensive strategy in which each player is responsible for defending a particular area of the court. Contrast man-to-man defense.

== See also ==
- Basketball moves
- Index of basketball-related articles
- Outline of basketball
