= Tear =

Tear(s) may refer to:

- Tear (physics), a break in a material caused by the exertion of force
- Tears, a clear liquid secreted by the tear gland in the eyes of land mammals
- Muscle tear, a rip in a muscle also known as a strain

== Arts and entertainment ==
=== Literature ===
- "Tears", a poem by Edward Thomas
- "Tears", a poem by Walt Whitman

=== Music ===
==== Performers ====
- The Tears, an English rock band
- Tears (Danish band), a jazz-rock group

==== Albums ====
- Tears (The Crocodiles album), 1980
- Tears (The Crüxshadows album), 2001
- Tears (Paul Bley album), 1983
- Tears, by Fumiya Fujii, 1996
- Tears, by Joseph Williams, 2007
- Love Yourself: Tear, by BTS, 2018

==== Songs ====
- "Tear", by Lotion from Full Isaac, 1993
- "Tear", by Smashing Pumpkins from Adore, 1998
- "Tear", by Red Hot Chili Peppers from By the Way, 2002
- "Tears" (Clean Bandit song), 2016
- "Tears" (Fayray song), 2000
- "Tears" (1930 song), by Frank Capano, made famous by Ken Dodd, 1965
- "Tears" (Perrie Edwards song), 2024
- "Tears" (Rush song), 1976
- "Tears" (Sabrina Carpenter song), 2025
- "Tears" (Tyla song), 2024
- "Tears" (X Japan song), 1993
- "Tears", by Aly & AJ from Insomniatic, 2007
- "Tears", by Charli XCX and Caroline Polachek from Pop 2, 2017
- "Tears", by Health from the Max Payne 3 soundtrack, 2012
- "Tears", by Jisoo from Amortage, 2025
- "Tears", by Macklemore from Ben, 2023
- "Tears", by Rockell from Instant Pleasure, 2000
- "Tears", by The Stone Roses from Second Coming, 1994
- "Tears", by Tinie Tempah featuring Cleo Sol, 2007
- "Tears", by Underground Solution featuring Colour Girl, 1998
- "Tears!", by 5 Seconds of Summer from 5SOS5
- "Tearz", by Wu-Tang Clan from Enter the Wu-Tang (36 Chambers), 1993
- "Outro: Tear", by BTS from Love Yourself: Tear, 2018

=== Other uses in arts and entertainment ===
- Tear (scratch), a type of scratch used by turntablists
- Tear (The Wheel of Time), a fictitious nation in the Wheel of Time series of fantasy novels
- Tears (film), a 2000 South Korean film directed by Im Sang-soo
- "Rei III", an episode of the television series Neon Genesis Evangelion, known in Japan as "Tears"

== People ==
- Tear (surname)
- Amanda Tears, Belgian drag queen

== See also ==
- Tearing (disambiguation)
- Torn (disambiguation)
- Rip and Tear (disambiguation)
- Tare (disambiguation)
- Data races, called "torn reads" or "torn writes"
- Tearfund, a British charity
- Tears for Fears, an English pop rock band
- Tear sheet, a proof of publication used in advertising
