= Teardrop =

Teardrop or Teardrops may refer to:

== Biology ==
- Tears, a clear liquid secreted by the lacrimal glands in the eyes
- Vastus medialis, or teardrop muscle, a muscle in the leg
- Dacrocyte, or teardrop cell, that can be found in bone marrow fibrosis

== Music ==
=== Musical groups ===
- The Teardrops, or Magic Slim and The Teardrops, a Chicago band
- The Teardrops (UK band), a post-punk band from Manchester, England
- The Teardrops (girl group), a 1960s girl group from Cincinnati, Ohio
- The Teardrops, a 1960s girl group from New Jersey featuring Rhonda Franklin

=== Instruments ===
- The unofficial name of the Mark III, and Mark VI electric guitars made by Vox

=== Albums ===
- Teardrops (album), a 2010 album by Tom Dice

=== Songs ===
- "Teardrop" (song), by Massive Attack (1998)
- "Teardrop" (Lolawolf song) (2014)
- "Tear Drop", a US#23 Santo & Johnny instrumental (1959)
- "Teardrops" (Bring Me the Horizon song) (2020)
- "Teardrops" (Elena Paparizou song) (2006)
- "Teardrops" (George Ducas song) (1994)
- "Teardrops" (George Harrison song) (1981)
- "Teardrops" (Liam Payne song) (2024)
- "Teardrops" (Shakin' Stevens song) (1984)
- "Teardrops" (The 411 song) (2004)
- "Teardrops" (Womack & Womack song) (1988)
- "Teardrops", by Joe Satriani from Shapeshifting (2020)
- "Teardrops", by The Proclaimers from Sunshine on Leith (1988)
- "Teardrops", by Craig David from 22 (2022)
- "Tear Drops", by B5 from Don't Talk, Just Listen (2007)
- "Tear Drops", by Lee Andrews & the Hearts (1957)

== Places ==
- Tear Drop Memorial, a sculpture memorial to the victims of the September 11 terrorist attacks
- Teardrop Park, a public park in lower Manhattan, near the site of the World Trade Center
- Teardrop Pond, a meltwater pond in Marie Byrd Land

== Species ==
- Teardrop white-eye, a bird in the family Zosteropidae
- Teardrop butterflyfish, a species of butterflyfish (family Chaetodontidae)
- Teardrop darter, a species of darter endemic to the eastern United States

== Technology ==
- Teardrop attacks, a remote denial-of-service attack (DoS)
- Teardrop trailer, a type of travel trailer
  - Teardrop trailer (truck), an aerodynamically shaped semi-trailer with a curved-roof
- Teardrop hull, a submarine hull design
- T150 C 'Teardrop', a classic car made by Talbot-Lago
- Teardrop (electronics), a printed circuit board feature
- Lighting designed by Tokujin Yoshioka

== Other uses ==
- Teardrop (basketball), a basketball move usually performed by undersized players
- Teardrop tattoo, a tattoo in the sign of a teardrop used by various gang members
- Teardrop turn, a method of reversing the course of an aircraft or vessel
- Teardrop, a character from the first season of Battle for Dream Island, an animated web series
- A type of stroke ending in typography

== See also ==
- Tear (disambiguation)
- Drop (disambiguation)
