= Pinoy step =

Basketball move

Pinoy step is a basketball move in which an offensive player picks up their dribble, quickly simulates taking a shot the while going towards the basket then proceeds to make an actual shot with the last remaining legal step. It is intended to allow the ball handler to get past a defender and take a more advantageous shot.

== Background ==
Some media attribute the move to basketball players in the Philippines. Fans attribute the combination of gather step and pump fake as the Filipino version of a Euro step before going airborne. It can be especially effective when a shorter ball handler takes on a taller defender. As a result, the name "Pinoy step" was given (Pinoy is a colloquial demonym for Filipinos). Anecdotal reports give credit to Kiefer Ravena and Ricci Rivero for popularizing it. In a 2023 SB Nation article, Lucas Kaplan wrote Ravena is "credited as one of the pioneers of the move, and it's been in his bag since high school," adding "the Pinoy is unmistakably the product of amateur and professional ballers in the Philippines over the past decade."

NBA players Mikal Bridges, Tyrese Haliburton, Ty Jerome and Zach LaVine frequently use the ball fake on the move with success.

== See also ==
- Basketball moves
