= Jump shot (basketball) =

Basketball technique

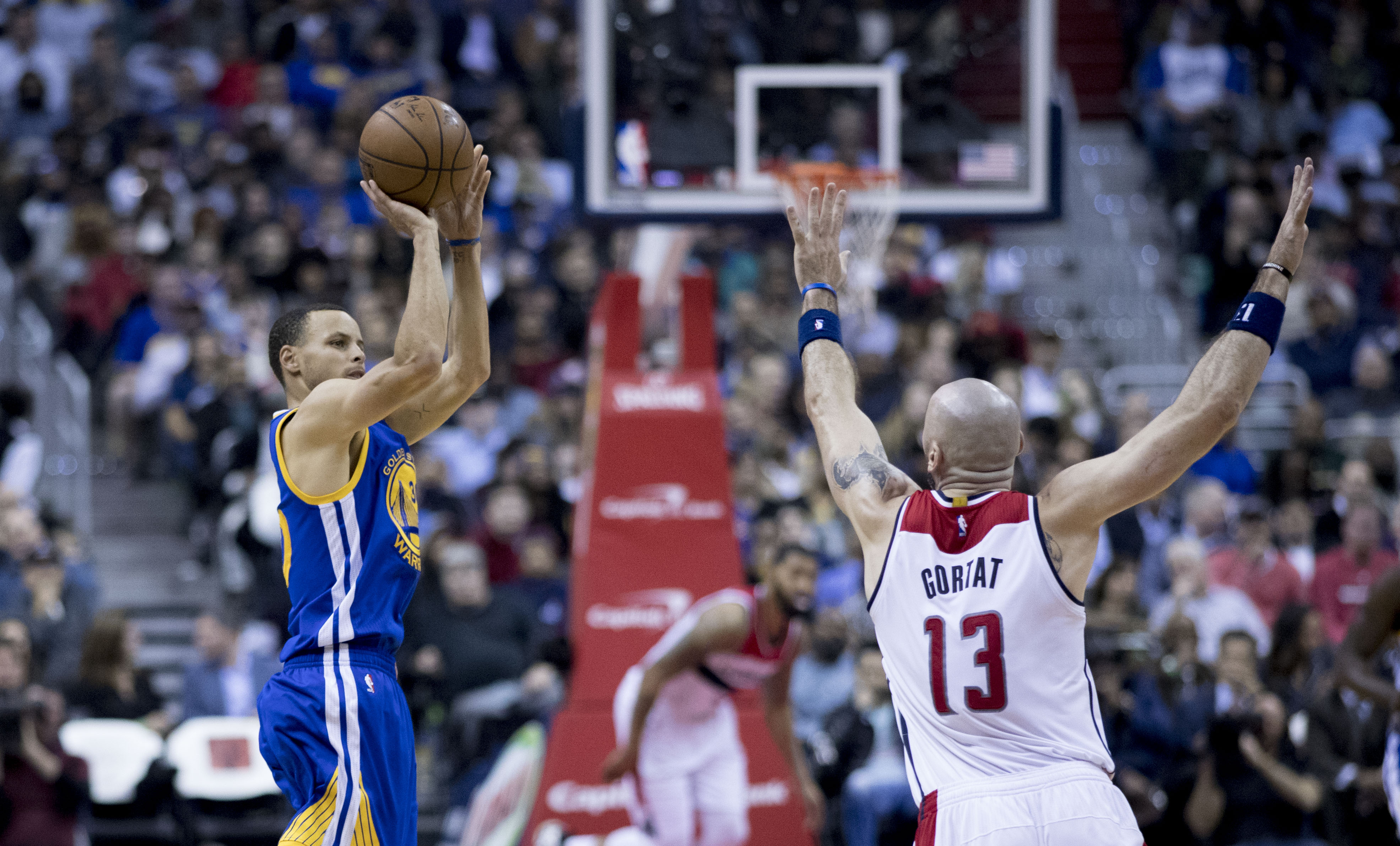
Stephen Curry attempting a jump shot over Marcin Gortat

In basketball (and derivatives like netball), a player may attempt to score a basket by leaping straight into the air, the elbow of the shooting hand cocked, ball in hand above the head, and launching the ball in a high arc towards the basket for a jump shot (colloquially, a jumper). Although early critics thought the leap might lead to indecision in the air, the jump shot replaced the earlier, less quickly released set shot, and eventually transformed the game because it is the easiest shot to make from a distance and more difficult for a defender to block. Variations on the simple jump shot include the "turnaround jumper" (facing away from the basket, then jumping and spinning towards it, shooting the ball in mid-air); the "fadeaway" (jumping away from the basket to create space); and the "leaning jumper" (jumping towards the basket to move away from a trailing defender). With the "hook shot," a player is turned sideways with the shooting arm away from the basket outstretched so that with a sweep he can launch the ball over his head. Since a defender must leap to block a jumper, the shooter may use a pump fake to get the defender in the air at the wrong time and so have a clear shot. If the shooter leaps into the defender, a foul is called on the defensive player, whereas the shooter is awarded two throws according to the value of a missed attempt, or a single free throw.

== Technique ==
Though techniques differ from player to player, coaches and instructors stress "BEEF" when shooting: Balance, Eyes, Elbows, & Follow Through. Because players have different builds, play styles, and individual preferences, not every player strictly adheres to this form.

When performing the jump shot maneuver, balance is paramount. While elite shooters like Stephen Curry and Klay Thompson can get off shots from a myriad of angles, a solid base—one with feet pointed towards the basket—greatly increases the chance of making the shot: "[p]roficient free throw shooters had greater knee and elbow flexion". A strong base that uses legs and core improves the chances the jump shooter will have of making a shot from distance—using legs and core to spring up will get the player enough power to get the ball in the basket. Eyes locked on the rim, shooters know what to aim for; some players elect to aim for the front of the rim, some the back. The elbow is considered the make-or-break aspect of a shooting form— having the elbow straight and in line with the rim keeps the ball on target, according to Steve Kerr. The shooting hand should be cocked onto the ball; when raising arms to shoot, the shooting arm should form an angle between 45º and 90º with the elbow straight. Following through on the shot puts rotation, or spin, on the ball to keep it on its trajectory. This is done by flicking the wrist and pointing fingers down.

Debate still continues as to who invented the jump shot. In the NCAA collegiate archives, John Miller Cooper, who played at the University of Missouri in the 1930s, is recognized as the person to hoist the first jump shot. However, John Christgau, in The Origins of the Jump Shot, makes a strong case that Ken Sailors did so in May 1934. Sailors went on to play for the University of Wyoming and was selected as MVP of their 1943 NCAA Championship team. Sailors also played for five different teams in the old American Basketball League. Other people that Christgau credits with the jump shot are Glen "Glenn" Roberts, Myer "Whitey" Skoog, John "Mouse" Gonzales, Bud Palmer, Davage "Dave" Minor, “Jumping” Joe Fulks, Johnny Adams, and Belus Smawley. Hank Luisetti is credited with popularizing the jump shot. Paul Arizin popularized the running jump shot.

== Advancement ==
In the last ten years, the National Basketball Association has seen an increase in the percentage of three-pointers taken. With this increase —from 22% in 2011 to 39% in 2021—, the percentage of “deep twos”, or midrange jump shots, has decreased. The advent of “small ball” encourages a spread-out, open offense, lending itself to more perimeter shots.

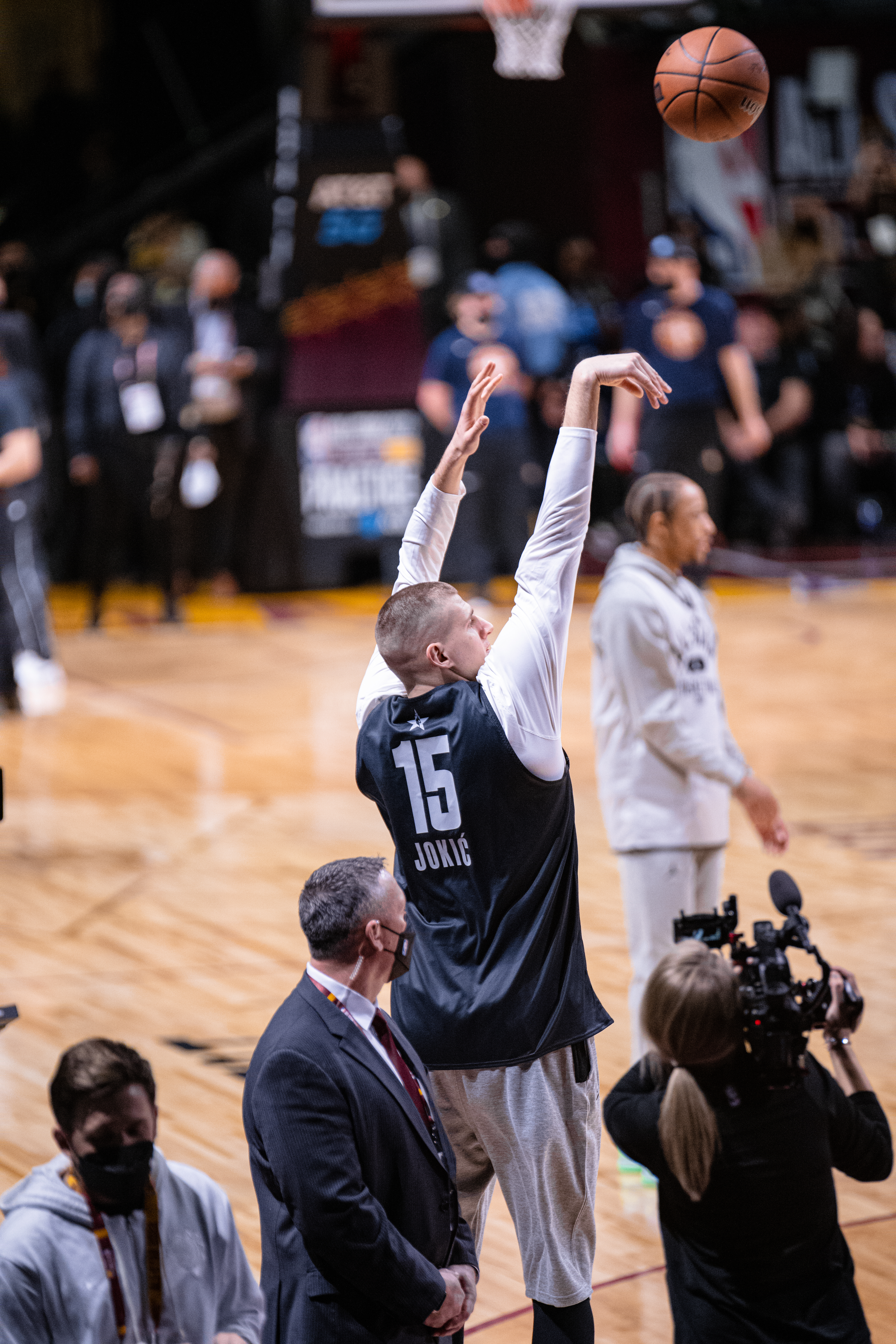
6' 11'' Nikola Jokić attempting a 3-point shot before the NBA All-Star game.

With more guards and hybrid, utilitarian position-less players on the floor, shooting more jump shots is incorporated into game strategies by coaches. Traditionally, methodical half court offenses used to swing the ball around, pass it to the big man, who might score inside by sheer strength or footwork grace. Now, the game of basketball as a whole employs a more fast-paced playstyle that emphasizes passing and perimeter (three point) based offenses.

As result, taller players are more comfortable shooters than their similarly statured predecessors. When a larger player is adept at shooting, they are known as a stretch four, as they stretch the floor by pulling their larger (interior) defender out on the perimeter. This opens up driving lanes for other players to attack the rim. Players like Dirk Nowitzki (right) break the mold of a traditional 7-footer; 40 years ago, Nowitzki would have been required to put on weight and become a heavyweight center, but his versatile offensive repertoire allowed him and Steve Nash to change the way opposing defenses guarded the pick and roll. Nowitzki had the ability to "pick and pop", spacing the floor for his teammates.
