= Shooting guard =

Basketball position

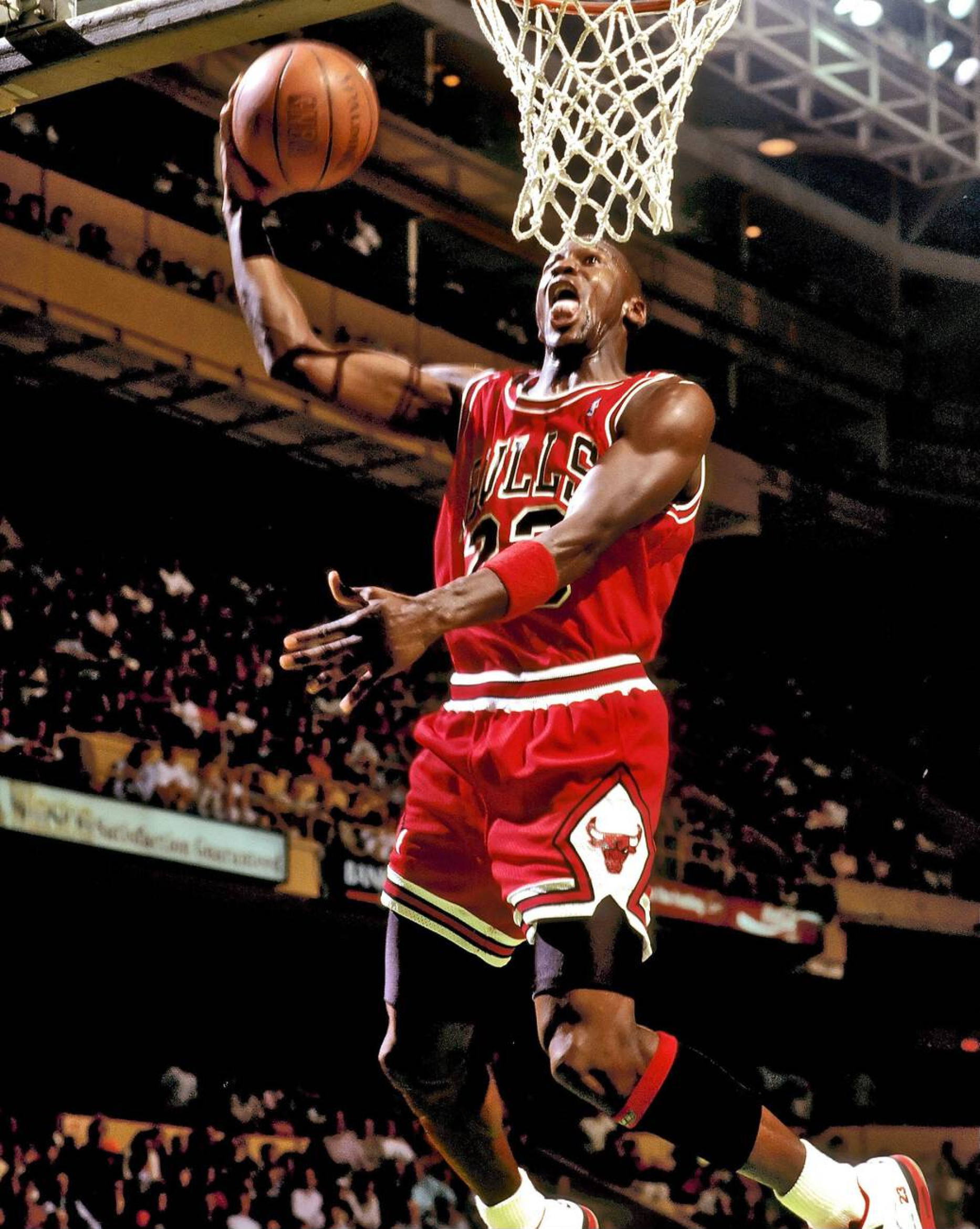
Michael Jordan is considered the greatest shooting guard in the history of the National Basketball Association (NBA).

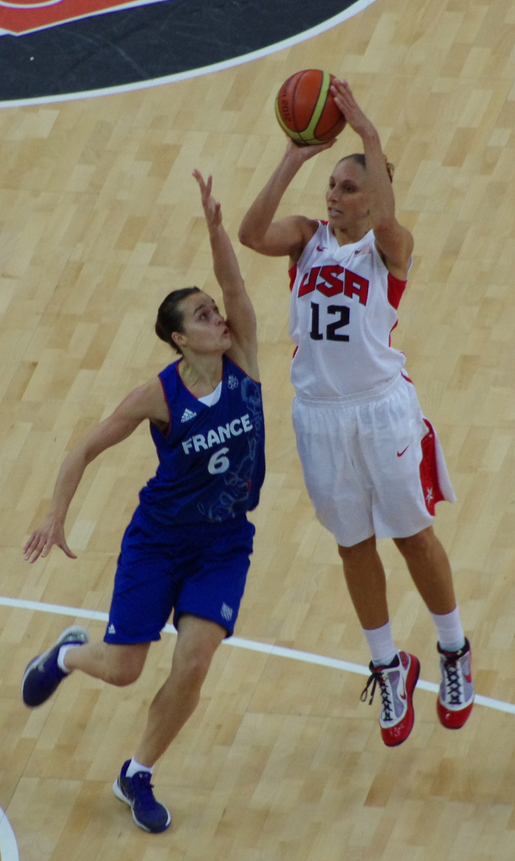
Diana Taurasi (right) is regarded as a top shooting guard in the history of the Women's National Basketball Association (WNBA).

The shooting guard (SG), also known as the two, two guard or off guard, is one of the five traditional positions in a regulation basketball game.

A shooting guard's main objective is to score points and steal the ball on defense. Shooting guards typically play the "wing" of the court and are generally expected to play better in isolation than other positions. Some shooting guards are tasked with being a "spot up" shooter assigned to catch and shoot the ball, either on an open shot or in transition. They are also expected to have skills driving to the basket or creating separation on an isolation defender.

Some teams ask shooting guards to inbound the ball and bring it up the court; these players are known colloquially as combo guards. A player who can switch between playing shooting guard and small forward is known as a swingman. In the NBA, shooting guards usually range from 6 ft 4 in (1.93 m) to 6 ft 6 in (1.98 m) while in the WNBA, shooting guards tend to be between 5 ft 10 in (1.78 m) and 6 ft 1 in (1.85 m).

== Characteristics and styles of play ==
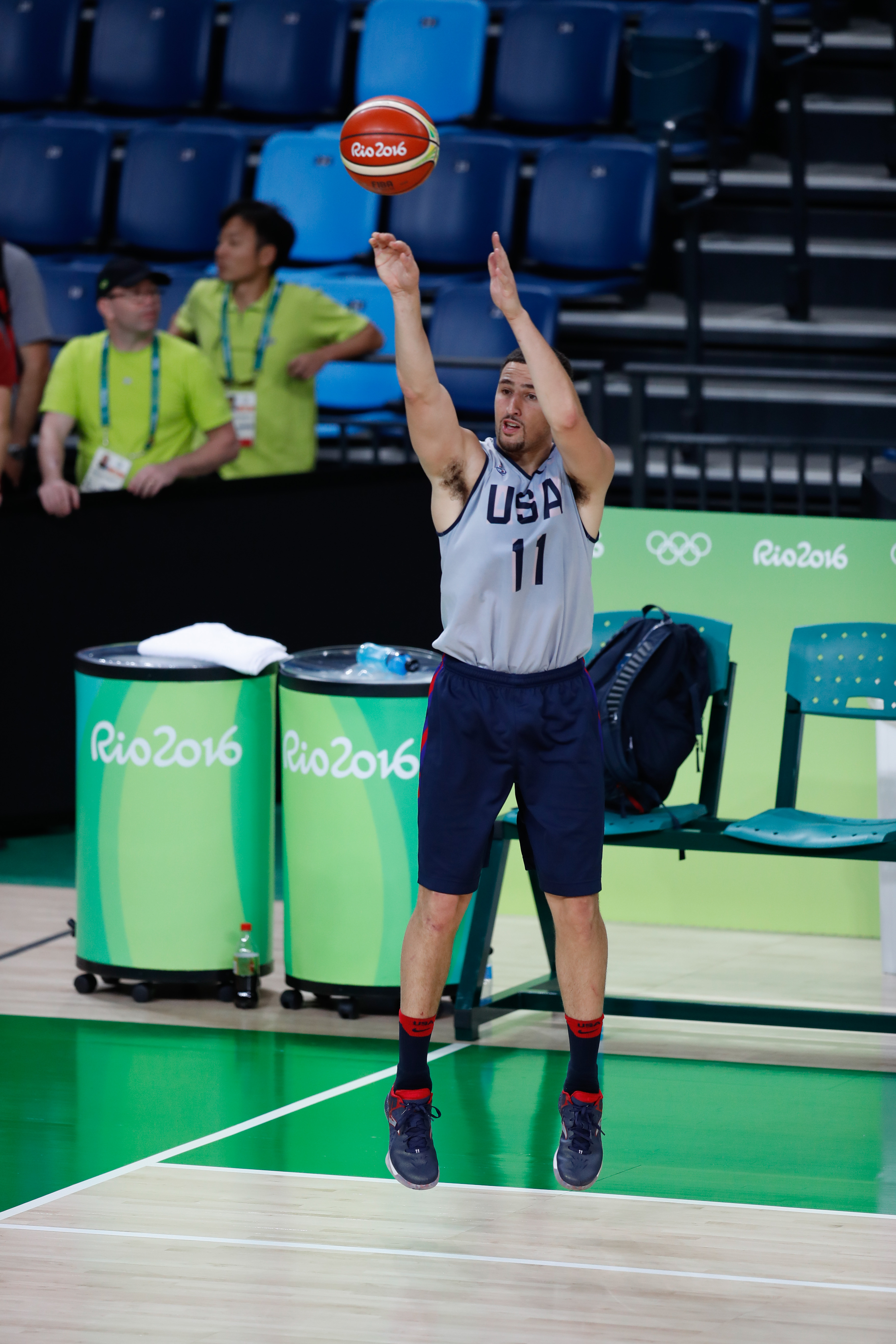
NBA shooting guard Klay Thompson is known for his ability as a "spot up" shooter. During his tenure with the Golden State Warriors, plays were often drawn to get Thompson open on a "catch and shoot" three-point shot.

The Basketball Handbook by Lee Rose describes a shooting guard as a player whose primary role is to score points. As the name suggests, most shooting guards are good long-range shooters, typically averaging 35–40 percent from three-point range. Many shooting guards are also strong and athletic, and have the ability to get inside the paint and drive to the basket.

Typically, shooting guards are taller than point guards. Height at the position varies; many bigger shooting guards also play small forward. Shooting guards should be good ball handlers and be able to pass reasonably well, though passing is not their main priority. Since good shooting guards may attract double-teams, they are frequently the team's back-up ball handlers to the point guard and typically get a fair number of assists.

Shooting guards must be able to score in various ways, especially late in a close game when defenses are tighter. They must have a high free throw percentage too, to be reliable in close games and discourage opposing players from fouling them. Because of the high level of offensive skills shooting guards need, they are often a team's primary scoring option, and sometimes the offense is built around them.

In the NBA, there are some shooting guards referred to as "3 and D" players. The term 3 and D implies that the player is a good 3 point shooter who can also play effective defense. The 3 and D player has become very important as the game sways to be perimeter oriented.

Good shooting guards can often play point guard to a certain extent.

It is usually accepted that point guards should have the ball in their hands at most times in the game, but sometimes the shooting guard has a significant enough influence on the team to handle the ball extremely often, to the point that the point guard may be reduced to a backup ball handler or a spot-up shooter, a player who "spots-up" for catch-and-shoot shots to provide spacing for the offense. Notable shooting guards include Michael Jordan, Kobe Bryant, Dwyane Wade, Manu Ginobili, James Harden, Klay Thompson, Tracy McGrady, Joe Dumars, Clyde Drexler, Jerry West, Sam Jones, Donovan Mitchell, Allen Iverson, and Anthony Edwards in the NBA and Diana Taurasi, Jewell Loyd, Seimone Augustus, Cynthia Cooper, and Cappie Pondexter in the WNBA.

== Skills and qualities ==
It is important for a shooting guard to develop skills in defense, passing and strength in addition to shooting ability. This position displays the most movement offensively when trying to get an open shot, along with keeping things under control on the defensive end.

Understanding that this position is shaped around the shooting ability of the athlete, many external abilities implemented into the player will overall help construct the potential the athlete possesses. External abilities would consist of strong ball handling, a sharp mind, and the development of a high basketball intelligence.

Shooting guards are often used as the secondary ball handler to help eliminate pressure of the 1 guard.
