= Tare =

Tare or Tares may refer to:

- Tare (armour), a leg and groin protector used in a number of Japanese martial arts
- Tare (legume), several plants of the legume family
- Tare (surname), a surname
- Tare (tufted grass), a genus of nine species of tufted grasses
- Tare, Rwanda
- Tare River, in Romania
- Tare sauce, a Japanese dipping sauce
- Tare weight, the weight of an empty vehicle or container
- Tares, Iran
- Vicia sativa, a plant also known as the tare
- Lolium temulentum, the noxious weed darnel also known as false wheat
- Parable of the Tares, a parable of Jesus, referring to tares (flowering plants) as weeds
