= Gravity (basketball) =

Basketball terminology

In basketball, the term gravity is used when describing situations in which players without the ball draw defenders to them, simply as a result of their shooting ability being a known threat. This in turn helps their teammates access more open shot opportunities themselves. As the offensive player is deemed a threat by the defending team, the defense collapses in on the player, hence the player is described as having gravity on offense.

== Use and history of term ==
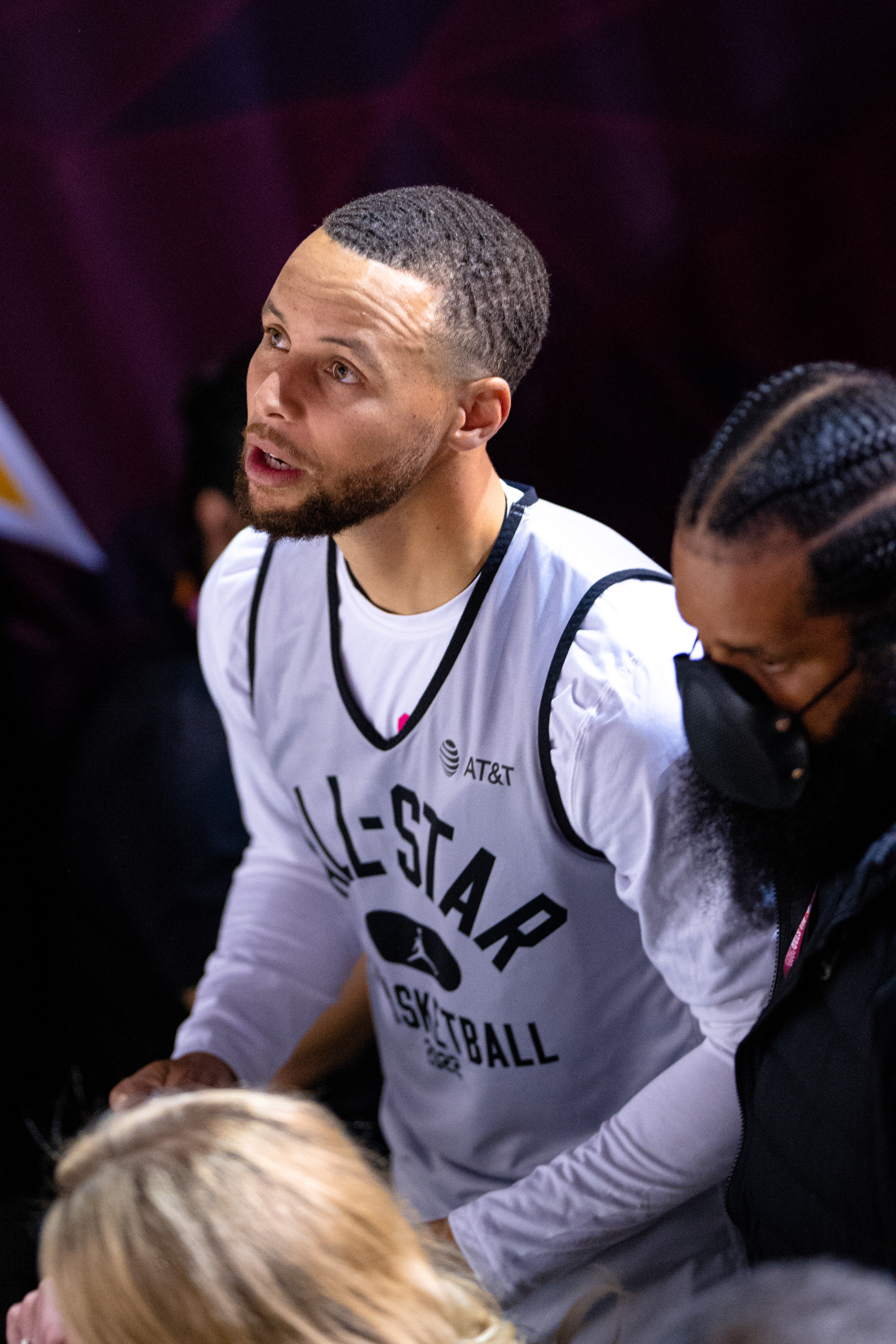
Stephen Curry is a commonly cited example of a player with high gravity

Popularized in the mid-2010s, the term is commonly used when describing a player's off-ball shooting ability. The term gained popularity as Stephen Curry of the Golden State Warriors began to develop into an MVP-caliber player, helping establish the Warriors as an NBA dynasty. Curry has since become a commonly cited example of a player who exhibits a great amount of on-court gravity. Fellow NBA player CJ McCollum suggested that Curry cannot be guarded with just one person, stating "He's a galaxy, he's a planet, he's a solar system. Everything revolves around him."

== Context and determinants ==
While on offense, each player has gravity at varying levels. In addition, the ball itself has gravity as there is "the need to pressure the ball-handler and keep him from getting a wide-open shot." Similarly, the basket also has gravity, "since the highest-percentage shots tend to be taken from close range."

A player with high shooting ability has a high amount of gravity when off the ball. Gravity is contextual to a player's role within their team's offensive gameplan, as well as their on-court location. ESPN writer Kevin Pelton elaborated on this, writing "A put-back specialist with limited range has almost no gravity when he plays on the perimeter, but high gravity inside the paint because of the threat he poses on the offensive glass."

== See also ==
- Outline of basketball
- Small ball (basketball)
