= Tare (surname) =

Tare is a surname. Notable people with the surname include:

- Aditya Tare (born 1987), Indian cricketer
- Anant Tare (1953–2021), Indian politician
- Auron Tare (born 1968), Albanian historian
- Avey Tare (born 1979), American musician
- Igli Tare (born 1972), Albanian football player
- Vilas Tare, Indian politician

== See also ==
- Ieva Tāre (born 1974), Latvian women's basketball player
