= Tare (legume) =

Several species of flowering plant

Wild tare or tare is the name given to several flowering plants of the pea family (Fabaceae), of the genus Vicia, or 'vetch', hence they look very similar to the vetches in the same genus. These plants are found in Britain and northern Europe and have flowers ranging from pale to deep lilac in colour. Three species found in Britain are hairy tare (Vicia hirsuta), smooth tare (Vicia tetrasperma), and slender tare (Vicia tenuissima).
