= Off the ball =

Off the ball (or OTB) is a term used in football in the United Kingdom, usually associated with a player's action when not in possession of the ball, such as a fight or a late challenge.

If a referee does not see an OTB incident but another official, such as the assistant referee, does, the assistant may draw their attention, usually activating a buzzer that the referee has strapped to their upper arm or by waving their flag. The assistant will inform the referee as to what happened, and the referee will act according to the laws of the game. Depending on the severity of the incident, this may involve booking the involved player or sending them off.
