= Passing (sports) =

Ball technique in various sports

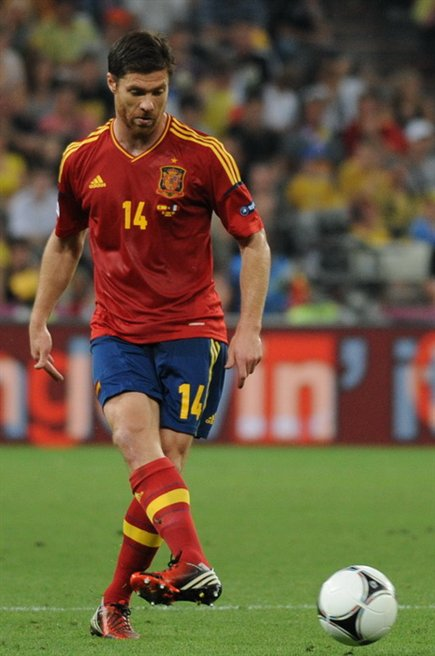
Xabi Alonso passing the ball

Passing is a common technique in sports that use balls and pucks. A pass consists of an intentional transfer of the ball from one player to another of the same team. Examples of sports that involve passing are association football, basketball, ice hockey, and American football. Certain games only allow backward passing (for example, rugby football), while others allow both. Of those that allow forward passing, some prohibit the receiver from being ahead of the pass at a certain point on the field (e.g., the offside rule in ice hockey), while other do not (e.g., American football).

Passing in basketball has been defined as "The deliberate attempt to move a live ball between two teammates", a definition which might equally apply across other sports equally well, albeit with a change to the item being passed where appropriate.

In certain sports, a pass to a teammate that leads to a successful scoring move is recorded, and tracked. In many sports, including basketball and ice hockey, this action is known as an assist. In basketball, only the last pass before a successful score is credited as an assist. Ice hockey attributes up to two assists on a goal scoring play. In that case, the last two teammates (not including the goal scorer) to touch the puck before the goal is scored would be credited with an assist. A team with a high number of assists demonstrates effective ball (or puck) passing between teammates, which is critical in most team sports, as it tends to lead to more, and higher quality scoring opportunities.

In bat-and-ball sports, the ball is only passed between teammates on defense. The goal is to pass the ball from one teammate to another so they can either, in baseball, tag or force out a base runner, or in cricket, run out a batsman by getting the ball to the wicket. Assists are also tracked in baseball, and any defender that touches a fairly hit ball that leads to a putout is credited.

== History of passing ==
Many early references to football refer to balls "flying high" and being "hit here". These, however, cannot be considered to be passing as there is no indication that they were between players of the same team. Similarly, they may not have been intentional passes (as opposed to fortuitously trying to move a ball upfield to gain possession).

Passing is first described in Cornish hurling. Modern passing was a feature of some English public school football games (for example, at Rugby school) and these were developed further by public school missionaries in teams such as Sheffield FC (1860s)and The Royal Engineers AFC (late 1860/early 1870s).

== See also ==
- Passing (association football)
- Passing (American Football)
- Forward pass (American and Canadian football)
- Lateral pass or onside pass, American and Canadian football respectively
- Pass (basketball)
- Pass (ice hockey)
