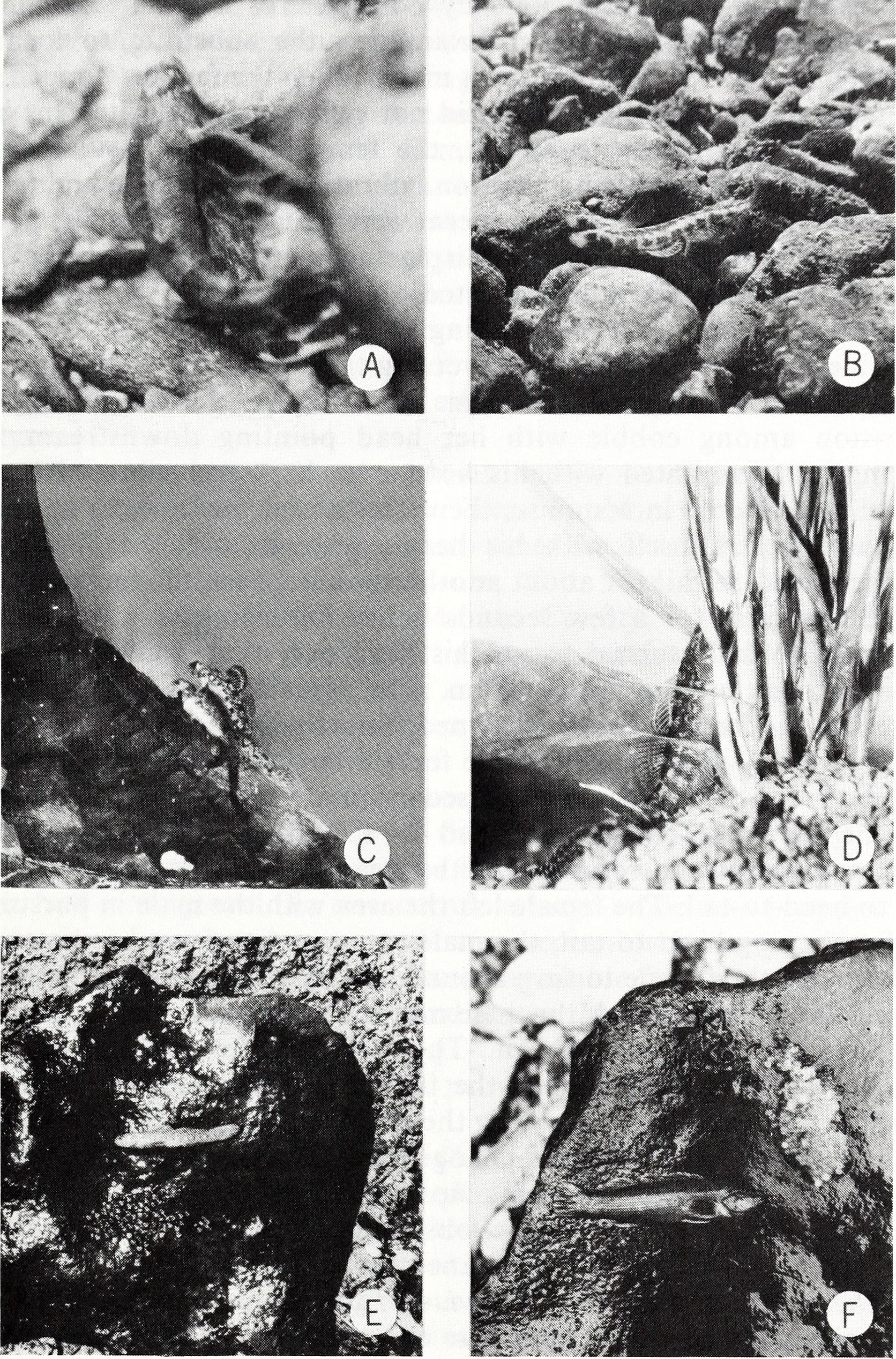
- Fig. 1. Egg deposition sites of darters. A) Percina evides spawning in Little River, Blount Co., TN, 17 June 1979. B) Etheostoma duryi spawning in Butler Creek, Lawrence Co., TN, 5 April 1975. C) Etheostoma chlorosomum spawning in aquarium; eggs are being deposited on dead leaf. D) E. asprigene spawning in aquarium; eggs are being deposited on leaves of grass. E) E. barbouri male and his nest of eggs on the underside of stone removed from Pettys Fork, Adair Co., KY, 29 May 1981. F) E. aquali male and his nest of eggs on underside of stone removed from Buffalo River, Lewis Co., TN, 5 May 1981. The male E. barbouri and E. aquali were guarding the eggs prior to removal.

Conservation status
- Least Concern (IUCN 3.1)

Scientific classification
- Kingdom: Animalia
- Phylum: Chordata
- Class: Actinopterygii
- Order: Perciformes
- Family: Percidae
- Genus: Etheostoma
- Species: E. barbouri

Binomial name
- Etheostoma barbouri Kuehne & Small, 1971

= Teardrop darter =

Species of fish

The teardrop darter (Etheostoma barbouri) is a species of freshwater ray-finned fish, a darter from the subfamily Etheostomatinae, part of the family Percidae, which also contains the perches, ruffes and pikeperches. It is endemic to the eastern United States. It is only found in Kentucky and Tennessee, where it occurs in the middle to upper reaches of the Green River drainage. It inhabits small rivers and creeks and rocky pools where it feeds on the larvae of blackflies and midges, immature stages of caddisflies and mayflies, and cladocerans and copepods. This species can reach a length of 6 cm (2.4 in), though most only reach about 4.2 cm (1.7 in). This species creates nests in which the females deposit their eggs and these are guarded by the male and have been found to contain between 40 and 80 eggs. The teardrop darter was first formally described by Robert A. Kuehne and James W. Small Jr. in 1971 with the type locality given as Brush Creek, a tributary of the Green River, 2.7 miles north of Liberty, Casey County, Kentucky. The specific name honours Professor Roger W. Barbour (1919–1993) in recognition of his contribution to the knowledge of Kentucky's vertebrate fauna.
