= Rip and Tear =

Rip and Tear may refer to:

- Tearing, the act of breaking apart a material by force
- "Rip and Tear", a song by L.A. Guns from the 1989 album Cocked & Loaded
- "Rip and Tear", a song by Sham 69 from the 1988 album Volunteer
- "Rip and Tear", a song from the soundtrack of 2016 video game Doom
- Rip and Tear, a 1986 album by Karen Lawrence
