= Torn =

Torn may refer to:

== Film and television ==
- Torn (2013 American film), directed Jeremiah Birnbaum
- Torn (2013 Nigerian film), directed by Moses Inwang
- Torn (2021 film), an American documentary film
- Torn (TV series), a 2007 British three-part drama series
- "Torn" (Battlestar Galactica), a television episode

== Music ==
=== Albums ===
- Torn (Evergrey album), 2008
- Torn (Neon Cross album), 1995

=== Songs ===
- "Torn" (song), best known for its 1997 Natalie Imbruglia cover, first released in English in 1995 by Ednaswap
- "Torn" (LeToya song), 2006
- "Torn" (Lisa Ajax song), 2019
- "Torn" (Ava Max song), 2019
- "Torn", by Adagio from Life, 2017
- "Torn", by Almah from Fragile Equality, 2008
- "Torn", by Annihilator from Waking the Fury, 2002
- "Torn", by Aṣa from Lucid, 2019
- "Torn", by Creed from My Own Prison, 1998
- "Torn", by Disturbed from Indestructible, 2008
- "Torn", by Gary Numan from Pure, 2000
- "Torn", by Into Eternity from Into Eternity, 1999
- "Torn", by Novembers Doom from To Welcome the Fade, 2002
- "Torn", by Poison the Well from Distance Only Makes the Heart Grow Fonder, 1998
- "Torn", by Primal Fear from 16.6 (Before the Devil Knows You're Dead), 2009
- "Torn", by Shadow Gallery from Room V, 2005
- "Torn", by U2 and Dolly Parton from Carnaval de Luz, 2026

== Video games ==
- Torn (2004 video game), a crime-themed MMORPG
- Torn (2018 video game), a virtual reality game from Aspyr Media
- Black Isle's Torn, a cancelled computer role-playing game
- Torn, a character on the video game series Jak and Daxter

== Literature ==
- Torn, a 2011 novel by Margaret Peterson Haddix, part of The Missing novel series
- Torn (novel), a 2010 novel by Amanda Hocking

== People ==
- Birgitta Törn (born 1948), Swedish curler
- Cecilia Törn (born 1994), Finnish ice dancer
- David Torn (born 1953), American musician
- Helge Törn (born 1928), Finnish cyclist
- Kees Torn (born 1967), Dutch comedian
- Nina Gagen-Torn (1900–1986), Russian historian and poet
- Rip Torn (1931–2019), American actor
- Roman Torn (born 1967), Canadian alpine skier

== See also ==
- Toon (disambiguation)
- Tore (disambiguation)
