= Tear (surname) =

Tear is a surname, and may refer to:

- Charlie Tear (born 2004), Scottish cricketer
- Philip Tear (born 1998), Swedish football goalkeeper
- Robert Tear (1939–2011), Welsh singer
