= Euro step =

Basketball move

The Euro step, two-step, or long lateral Nate Step is a basketball move in which an offensive player picks up their dribble, takes a step in one direction, and then quickly takes a second step in another direction. It is intended to allow the offensive player to evade a defender and attack the basket.

== Background ==
According to Wall Street Journal writer Ben Cohen, the Euro step is a crafty and exotic move introduced in the NBA over two decades ago (from 2018) to "plant one way, take one long step at full speed the other way, avoid contact and sneak around the defender for an easy layup." This misdirection move, which allows players to gather a dribble and take two additional steps, has stirred controversy in the NBA surrounding its legality as it finds itself on the edge of a traveling violation, as reported by The New York Times writer Jonathan Abrams.

Anecdotal reports indicate that officials not familiar with the move may call it a traveling violation. Today, the Euro step is often used when a player drives to the hoop, and it can be especially effective when a shorter guard takes on a taller forward or center. In a 2018 ESPN.com story on the move, writer Jordan Brenner said, "It has changed the way players navigate the defense to reach the rim and, with it, the game of basketball itself," also adding that the move "would end up altering the very balance of power between penetrator and defender."

== History ==
Lithuanian player Šarūnas Marčiulionis introduced the two-step maneuver to the NBA in 1989 when he played for the Golden State Warriors. Fans nicknamed the move “the Euro step” as a tribute to many European players’ exceptional fundamentals and crafty footwork.

While the term "Euro step" made its first media appearance in 2007, the move has a long history in European basketball. In Brenner's 2018 story, he noted that longtime coach Vlade Đurović had seen early versions of the move around 1960. Đurović commented: "That move was normal in Europe, especially in Yugoslavia". It's nearly impossible to pinpoint the origin of the Euro step, having evolved over time in Eastern Europe.

The mid-1980s marked the beginning of the move's modern era. Back then, Toni Kukoc was a 17-year-old phenom playing for his home club of Jugoplastika in Split, Croatia, where practices routinely lasted eight hours and coach Slavko Trninic emphasized finding different ways to get to the basket. To emulate a defender trying to take a charge, Trninic would place a chair in the middle of the lane and instruct players to dribble from the 3-point line and attempt to finish at the rim.

The move was popularized in North America in the 2000s by Manu Ginóbili, who arrived in the NBA from the Italian basketball league, though Ginobili honed the move while playing on playgrounds in his native Argentina. ESPN's Zach Lowe credits Manu Ginóbili with making the Euro step popular in the NBA. Lowe said Ginóbili's regular use of the move in the early 2000s “changed the NBA forever” by inspiring a new wave of guards to use it, especially James Harden, who made the Euro step a key part of his scoring. Thanks to Ginóbili, the Euro step went from a little-known European move to one of the NBA's most common ways to finish at the rim. It has since been adopted by many American-born players, among them James Harden and Dwyane Wade. According to Brenner, the physical gifts of another European player, Giannis Antetokounmpo, have led his version of the Euro step to become "the final phase of the move's evolution," adding:

A FiveThirtyEight study showed that he covers just over 15 feet off a single dribble when driving to the basket. Add that to his 7-foot-3 wingspan and he can start his Eurostep from the 3-point line. . . . James Naismith never could've envisioned two steps like Antetokounmpo's. Two steps that cover 15 feet. Two steps that render the area between the top of the key and the basket all but undefendable. The Greek Freak and others have weaponized footwork by stretching the rules to their limit. In doing so, they have fundamentally changed the way basketball is played and how we see it.

While the Euro step was in common use in the NBA, it did not become technically legal until 2009. The NBA rule book had always said a player could only take one step. In 2009, it changed to read "A player who receives the ball while he is progressing or upon completion of a dribble, may take two steps in coming to a stop, passing or shooting the ball." When the change was made, ESPN noted "It is believed to be the first time any league, at any level anywhere in the world, has explicitly allowed two steps."

A satirical article published by Medium in 2016 spread the myth that the Euro step was actually first used by Fidel Castro in 1959. Despite the writer stating that the article was a joke, the myth gained traction as an Internet meme.
