= Basketball moves =

List of individual basketball actions performed in basketball

Basketball moves are generally individual actions used by players in basketball to pass by defenders to gain access to the basket or to get a pass to a teammate to score.

== Dribble ==
Dribbling is bouncing the ball continuously with one hand at a time without holding the ball. Dribbling is necessary in order to take steps while possessing the ball.

=== Crossover (Cross) ===
In a crossover, the ball handler changes the ball from one hand to the other using a single dribble. The crossover is a common dribbling move and is used when changing direction. A crossover functions best when the ball handler looks and acts like they are headed in one direction, before crossing over to the other direction. This can often be achieved by a simple head fake, or a step in that intended direction. Lean with the step in the intended direction to get the defense to move.

==== Between the legs (BTL) ====
This is a commonly used variation of the crossover in which the ball-handler bounces the ball off of the floor between their legs and catches it with the other hand on the opposite side of their body. It is used as a safer way to cross over while directly facing a defender, but requires more slowing of forward momentum than the normal crossover dribble, as it requires more precise timing and execution.

==== Behind-the-back dribble ====
The behind-the-back dribble consists of moving the ball from one hand to the other hand by bouncing it behind one's back. This dribble is frequently used when a basic crossover dribble could be stolen. This dribble is especially useful when the offensive player is close to a defender and needs to switch the ball to the opposite hand, but does not have room to use a regular crossover.

==== Behind-the-back pass ====
An advanced pass involving the player with the basketball passing to a teammate by wrapping the ball behind their body.

==== Behind-the-back shot ====
A shot which the ball is passed behind the back to one hand then shot.

==== Wraparound ====
The wraparound is similar to behind-the-back crossover, except instead of the ball being thrown in a sideways direction and bouncing behind the ball handler's back, it is swung further around the back and thrown in a forward direction, bouncing on the side or in front of the ball handler's body. This move is mostly used when a defender lunges toward one side of the ball handler's body for a steal. The ball handler would then simply throw the ball around their body and quickly pass their defender.

=== Hesitation (Hesi) ===
A hesitation or hesi (/ˈhɛzi/ HEH-zee) is a split-second freeze while dribbling meant to trick the defender into changing direction to give the dribbler a chance to move around the defender or take a shot.

=== In and out dribble ===
An in and out dribble is widely used as a counter move to a crossover, whereby the ball handler fakes the crossover and pushes the ball back out on the same hand.

=== V dribble ===
Ball is dribbled with same hand in a V motion. Almost looks like a double crossover but ball stays in hand.

=== Shammgod dribble (Sham) ===
Similar to a V dribble but instead of facing to the sides it faces to its front. It can be used to feint or jab a defender into biting into the move making it look like a crossover

=== Pound dribble ===
Stopping then dribble the ball once like pounding the ball into a high dribble. It can be the start of a combo used to confuse defenders into biting into your moves

=== Different heights dribble ===
This technique involves dribbling the ball in different heights. This is usually combined with other dribbling techniques to make it more effective. It is mostly effective on players smaller or taller than the dribbler but not quite as much on players that are the same height as the dribbler. If you are facing a shorter opponent, you can lure them by pretending to bring the ball low and then suddenly turning the ball very high. If the opponent is taller than you, you can lure them by pretending to bring the ball high and quickly lowering the height of the dribble. If your opponent does not bite on your lure/trap, maintain the height of your dribble, and you can drive past them with more speed. If you're going to pass or shoot after your dribble, make sure that you will go back to your usual pace to maintain the momentum for your dribbling.

=== Ankle breaker dribble ===
This is when an offensive player does a move that makes their defender stumble to the ground. Players collapsing due to this rarely occurs under normal circumstances. Typically this happens when a defender loses balance, trips over their own feet, or even slips. An offensive player can't consistently control whether the defender falls, but using speed, body momentum, body contact and sharp changes of direction make it much more likely to happen. This move usually embarrasses the defender.

== After the dribble ==
=== Euro step ===
The Euro step (sometimes "Eurostep") is a move developed in European basketball in which a player, after picking up their dribble, takes a step in one direction bumping into their defender, and then quickly takes a second step in the other direction before they attempt a layup. It is an attempt to evade at least one defender before attacking the basket.

Šarūnas Marčiulionis, a Lithuanian, and Manu Ginóbili, an Argentine who arrived in the NBA from the Italian league, are credited with bringing the move to the NBA. It has since been widely used by many US-born players, such as Dwyane Wade, James Harden, and Russell Westbrook.

=== Jump stop ===
In a jump stop, the player takes one small step and lands on both feet simultaneously. It can be used after a dribble. A player who receives a pass with a jump stop can pivot after the stop using either foot.

=== Pro-Hop ===
The combination of a euro step and a jump-stop, the pro-hop is a move in which a player picks up their dribble with a synchronized right hand dribble/right foot step, or a synchronized left hand dribble with left foot step. The player then rips the ball to the opposite side of their body while landing on a jump-stop. The pro hop's ability to split defenders, or throw an opposing defender off rhythm through 'change of direction speed' is a move popularized by Shantay Legans, former point guard for University of California at Berkeley.

=== Pro-hop euro step ===
The Pro-hop Euro Step combines the pro-hop and Euro step while removing the pro-hop's jump stop. The player picks up their dribble with a synchronized right hand dribble/right foot step, or a left hand dribble with left foot step. Player then rips the ball to opposite side of their body (behind the back if skilled), takes two steps, and finishes with a reverse layup.

=== Power up ===
The power up is a move in which the player lands on their outside foot then inside foot, and powers up toward the basket. An effective move because of its balance and power resulting from a two-foot gather and take off.

=== Over-the-head ===
The over-the-head move is a move in which the player rotates the ball over their head in a circular fashion. This is done as the player is stepping to one side of the defender, while trying to get past them at the same time. It is essentially used as a way to prevent the ball from getting stolen. It is typically used when driving to the basket, and on fast breaks.

Pinoy Step

Pinoy Step is a basketball move when an offensive player picks up their dribble, quickly acts as if shooting a shot while going towards the basketball, then make the actual shot using their last legal step.

== Shots ==
=== Layups ===
A layup is a two-point attempt made by leaping from the ground, releasing the ball with one hand up near the basket, and using one hand to tip the ball over the rim and into the basket (lay-in) or banking it off the backboard and into the basket (lay-up). The motion and one-handed reach distinguish it from a jump shot. The layup is considered the most basic shot in basketball.

An undefended layup is usually a high-percentage shot. The main challenge is getting near the rim and avoiding blocks by taller defenders who usually stand near the basket. Common layup strategies are to create space, releasing the ball from different spots or using an alternate hand. A player tall enough (or with sufficient leaping ability) to reach over the rim might choose to perform a more spectacular and higher percentage slam dunk (dropping or throwing the ball through the basket from above the rim) instead.

As the game has evolved through the years, so has the layup. Several different versions of the layup are used today. Layups can be broadly categorized into two types: the underarm and the overarm. The underarm layup involves using most of the wrist and the fingers to 'lay' the ball into the basket or off the board. The underarm layup is more commonly known as the finger roll. A notable NBA player who uses the underarm finger roll is Dwyane Wade.

Finger-rolls today have many forms, including the Around the World which involves a complete circle around the player before the layup and a variety of faking in the approach to the rim. A classic example is a play by former Kings point guard Jason Williams during his time with Sacramento, in which Williams brings the ball behind his back with his right hand, in a fake of a back pass, and then brings it front again with the same hand for the finish (reminiscent of Bob Cousy who pioneered the move).

The other layup is the overhand shot, similar to a jump shot but from considerably closer range. Overhand layups almost always involved the use of the backboard. Players like Scottie Pippen and Karl Malone have used this move to great effect.

In addition, another variation of the lay-up is the wrong-foot layup. Typically, this move can be seen by inexperienced players with poor footwork, however, when done intentionally, a wrong-footed layup can deceive a defender into mistiming their block attempt. In a normal layup, the left foot is used to step off when laying in with the right hand, and vice versa. However, in a wrong-footed layup, the right foot is used to step off when laying in with the right hand. This also helps to shield the defender from reaching across to block the shot; in reaching across however, the defender will likely get called for a defensive foul. Tony Parker of the San Antonio Spurs relied heavily on the wrong footed layup, largely due to his smaller size and deceptive quickness.

==== Reverse layup ====
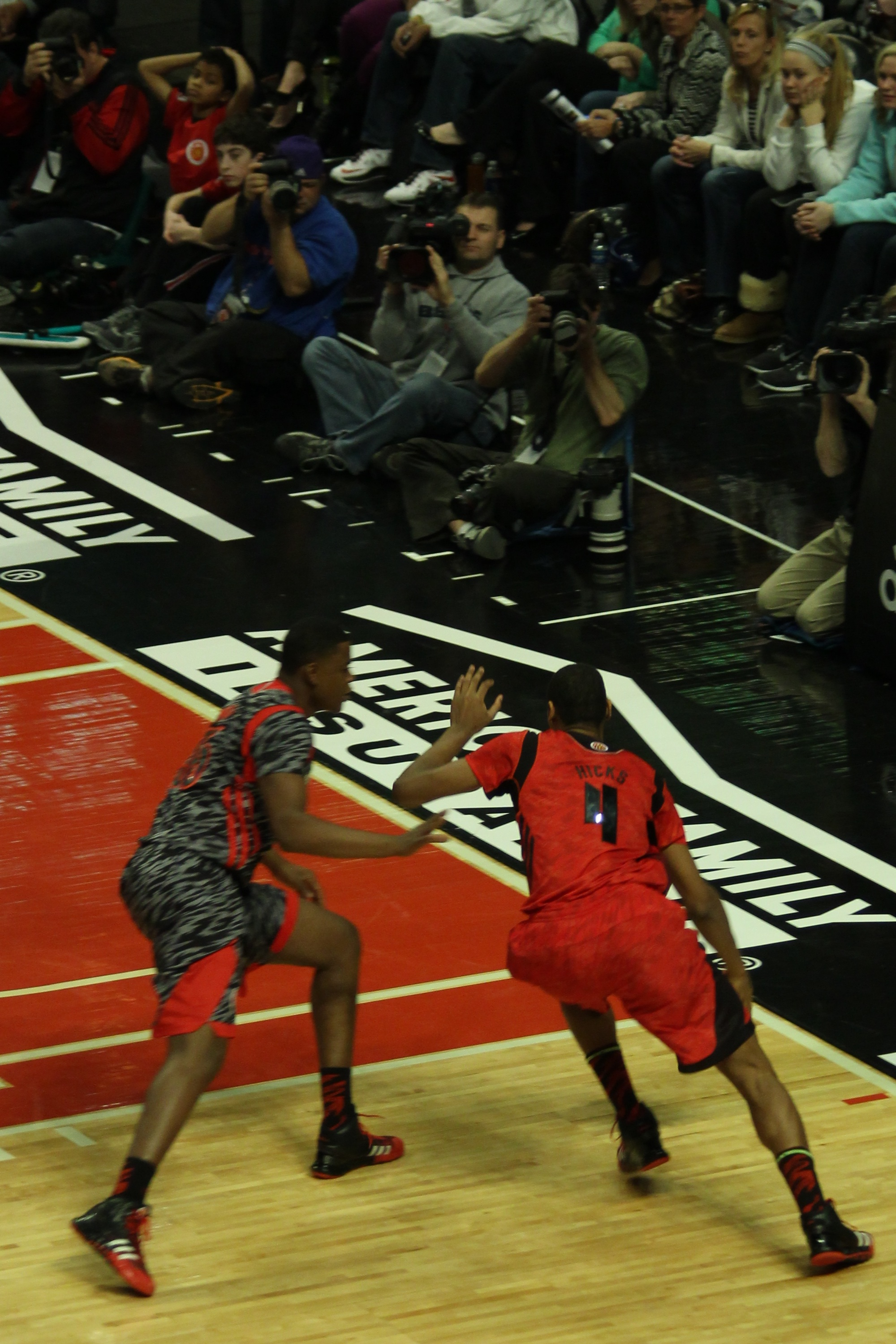
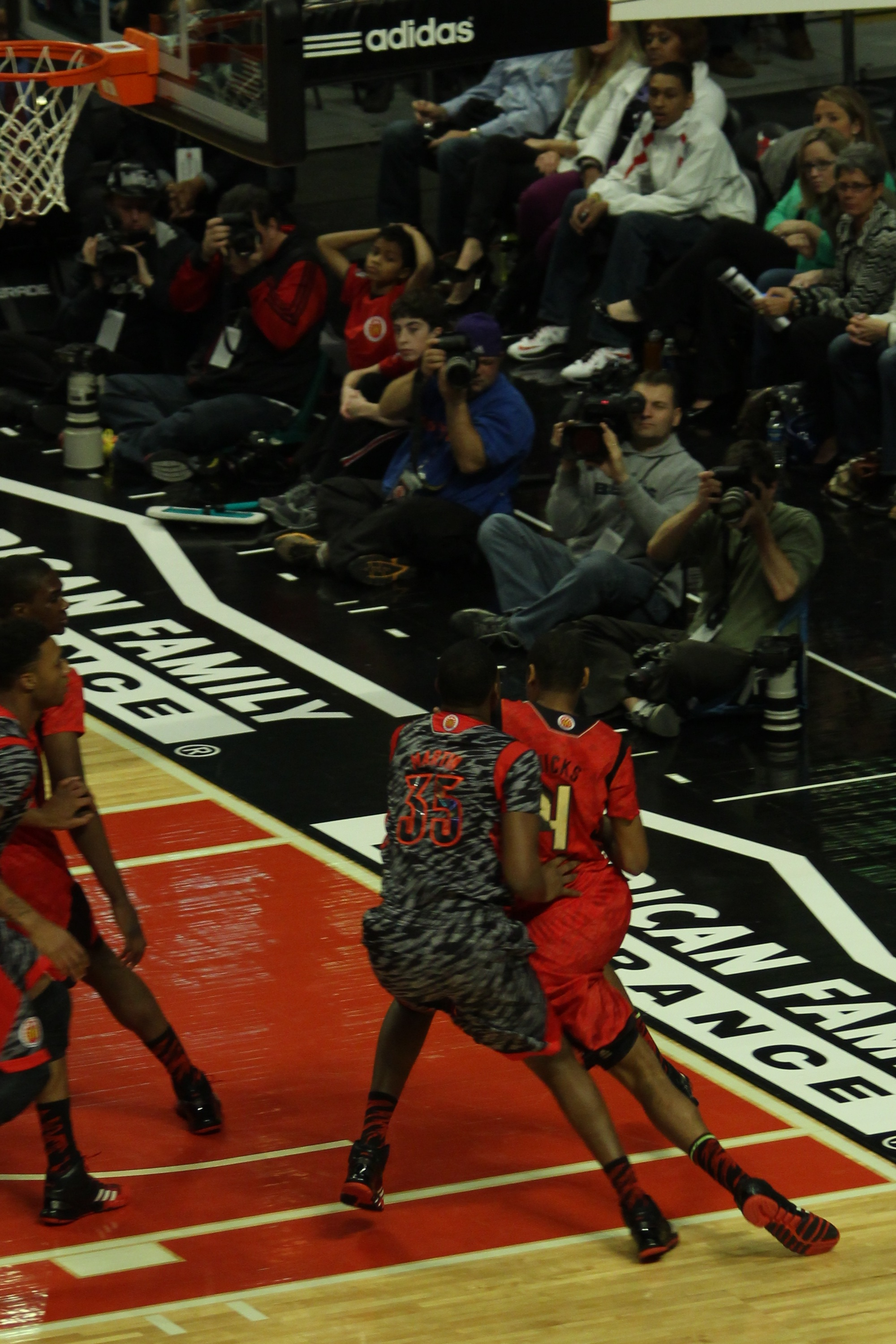
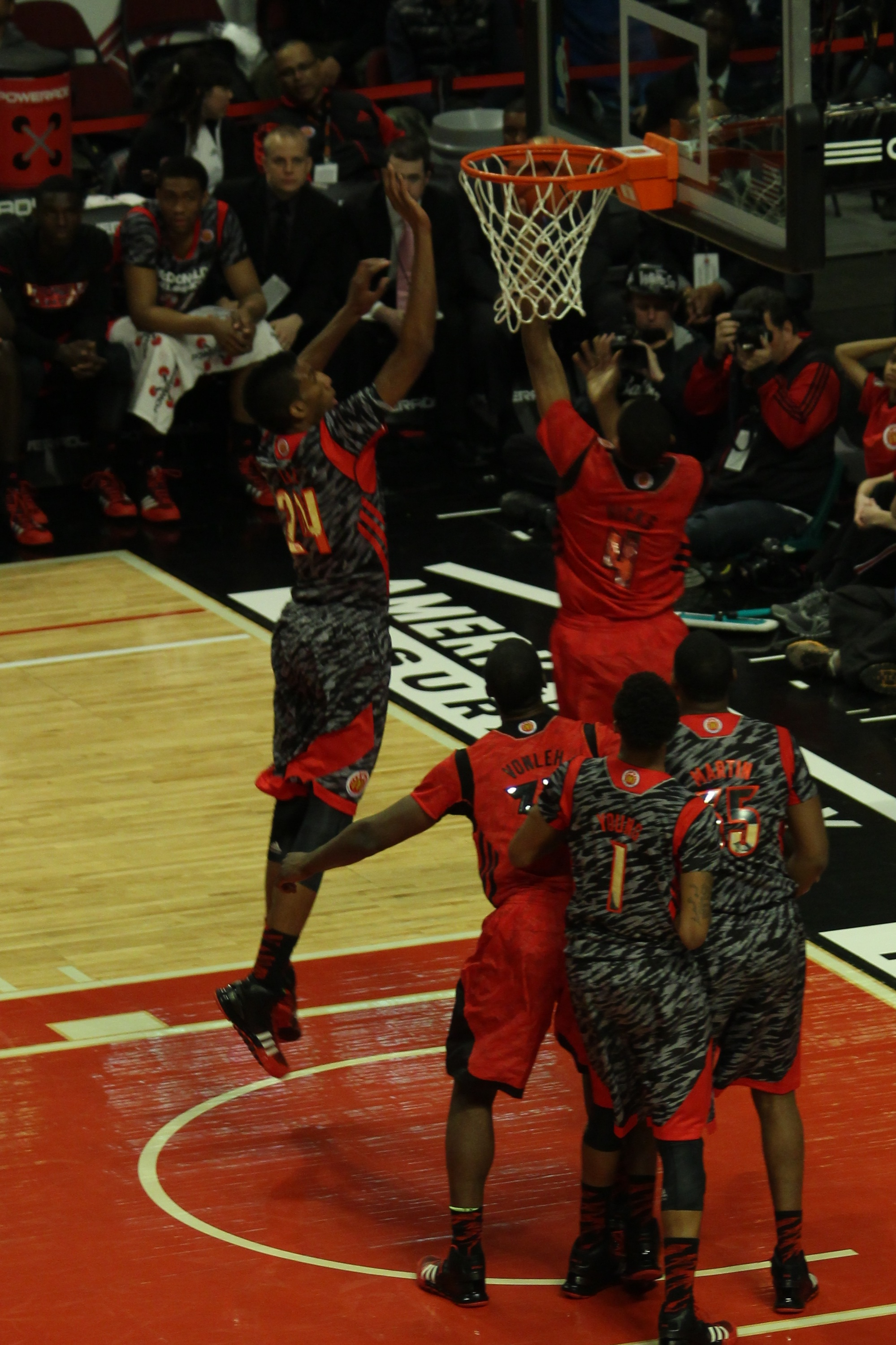
Isaiah Hicks does a reverse layup at the 2013 McDonald's All-American Boys Game

A reverse layup is a layup that is finished on the opposite side of the court's split-line than the player began the attack on.

==== Finger roll ====
A finger roll is performed when a player shoots the ball with one hand during a layup and then lifts their fingers, rolling the ball into the basket. The rotation produced provides the ball with a soft touch, and the ball will roll around the rim and then drop into the basket. Guard George Gervin and center Wilt Chamberlain were known for having some of the best finger rolls in the game. Other notable practitioners have included Michael Jordan, Scottie Pippen, and Jason Kidd.

==== Tear drop ====
The tear drop, also called a runner or a floater, is a high arcing shot over the reach of taller defenders in the lane. The shooter typically begins with a layup drive, stops short of layup range, and attempts to shoot before defenders can recover. By releasing the ball quickly and in a higher arc than a normal layup, the tear drop can be effective for shorter players to avoid blocked shots. It is so-named because the ball drops down from the high point of the arc like a falling tear drop. Gary Payton and John Stockton during their primes, the former in the mid-to-late 90s and the latter in the early-to-mid 90s were considered to have the best tear drops in the game. Chris Paul, Tony Parker, and Stephen Curry frequently use the tear drop with great success. Antawn Jamison had one of the most highly effective tear drop shots in the league despite being a power forward. Trae Young and Anfernee Simons are both currently known for the tear drop move.

==== Power layup ====
Power layup, also called jump stop layup, is a continuous shooting move in which a player stops dribbling and makes a huge leap forward (jump stop), while securing the ball in both hands from the dribbling hand, then making a layup. The move is generally used as a layup because the huge movement coming from the leap provides the momentum for the player to jump forward for a layup. The move is a great way to squeeze the player under the basket for a fast layup.

==== Double clutch ====
A double clutch is a move associated with a layup or a dunk; it is a change of ball position in mid-air (similar to the "up and under" move, but performed while the player is in the air). It is effectively used by many players.

=== Bank shot ===
A bank shot is a shot that relies on the ball bouncing off the backboard and into the basket. It is frequently used for mid-range jump shots from around a 45° angle and layups. It is not commonly used for long-range shots or shots from the middle or near the baseline. The purpose of using the backboard is to try to hit the backboard at an angle, thus slowing the speed of the ball and increasing its chances of falling into the hoop. Researchers at North Carolina State University found that bank shots may be 20 percent more effective up to a distance of about 12 feet than direct shots. Another term for a bank shot is "off the glass." Among the NBA players known for using or having used the bank shot often are Bob Pettit, Sam Jones, Elgin Baylor, Wilt Chamberlain, Elvin Hayes, George Gervin, Tim Duncan, Dwyane Wade, Dirk Nowitzki, Scottie Pippen, and Kobe Bryant.

=== Putback and tip-in ===
A putback describes a situation where a player secures an offensive rebound, then immediately scores a basket. If the player secures the rebound while in the air, for the shot to be considered a putback, the player can land on the ground before shooting, but cannot dribble before taking the shot. If the player does not secure the rebound but instead taps the ball into the basket, it is considered a tip-in. There is a point where the difference between a putback and a tip-in is subjective (e.g., a one-handed rebound in the air followed by a shot before touching the ground). A putback jam is a spectacular alternative to the tip-in, where the ball is slam-dunked off the rebound in the same motion. Bill Russell would use this move during his college days in the mid-1950s. It was a primary source of scoring for All-Star center Dwight Howard, who led the NBA in dunks in the 2008–09, 2009–10 and 2010–11 seasons. More famous examples of putbacks and tip-ins were Derrick White's crucial game-winning tip-in to avoid elimination and win Game 6 of the 2023 Eastern Conference Finals against the Heat, Aaron Gordon's buzzer-beating dunk in Game 4 of the 2025 first round of the Western Conference playoffs against the Clippers, the first known game-winning buzzer-beater putback dunk in NBA playoff history, and OG Anunoby's game-winning tip-in with 1.2 seconds remaining to win Game 4 of the NBA Finals against the Spurs.

== Triple threat position and related moves ==
Triple threat is the position when a player facing a defender receives a pass but has not dribbled yet. The offensive player's feet are slightly wider than shoulder width and slightly on the balls of their feet, their knees flexed, with both hands on the basketball in front of them or almost resting on their thigh, presenting the defender with an opponent able to move in any direction. One foot is held as the pivot and the other slightly ahead. From this, the player can choose from three options: to jump-shoot, to dribble (drive) past the defender or to pass it to a teammate. There are also options to get the defender out of their defensive stance by using jab steps and pump fakes.

=== Pivot ===
Pivoting is the act of rotating one's body while keeping the ball of one foot in place on the floor. Most of the player's balance should be on the pivot foot while slightly raising the heel in order to pivot on the ball of the foot. Pivoting can be done with or without the ball as it is an important tool to quickly change direction or orientation to the basket.

=== Jab step ===
A jab step, also known as side step, is performed when a player holds onto the ball before dribbling while their non-pivot leg performs a jabbing forward or side motion. This move is used to test defender's defensive weaknesses and stance. A combination of the pump fake, the drive, the shot and the crossover drive can be performed along with the jab step to lure the opponent out of their defense. Forward Carmelo Anthony is well known for taking the jab step, as was 13-year pro Kiki Vandeweghe. When the player does this, the defender falls off from their defensive stance, creating a space between the player and the defender, allowing them to take a quick mid-range jumper, a three-pointer, or a drive "to the lane."

=== Pump fake ===
A pump fake (also called a shot fake) is a feigned attempt at a jump shot, restrained before the feet leave the ground. The pump fake is a fundamental move in basketball, used to cause defenders to jump (known in basketball slang as "lifting" the defender) or be shifted off-balance. Its main applications are in the low post area, where a player is much more likely to have their shot blocked. On the perimeter, it is useful in creating open lanes to the basket by "showing" the ball enough to entice a defender to attempt to block or steal it, allowing the dribbler to penetrate easily. Michael Jordan, Kawhi Leonard, Paul Pierce, Kobe Bryant, and Dwyane Wade are known masters of the pump fake, with Leonard and Jordan being known to frequently use the one hand pump fake variation.

=== Drawing contact ===
An offensive move intended to produce a foul call on the defensive player. A typical strategy is to drive into a defensive player whose feet are not stationary. When the two players make bodily contact, a blocking foul can be called on the defensive player. If the defensive player has a set position (i.e., both feet are stationary and arms are not in a downward motion), the contact can result in a charging foul against the offensive player (this is known as taking the charge for the fouled defensive player). Another way of drawing contact is to pump fake and then jump towards the defender, make contact and then shoot; this gets you to the foul line. If you make the basket (often made in the paint), you get the basket and one foul shot. Players like DeMar DeRozan, Paul Pierce, James Harden, Kobe Bryant, Shai Gilgeous-Alexander Damian Lillard, and Dwyane Wade have mastered the art of drawing contact.

=== Shuffle ===
This move is similar to the jab step, but smaller. It is when a player uses multiple very little jab steps to throw off a defender and keep them constantly guessing whether you will go to the basket or not. It was used frequently by former San Antonio Spurs forward Tim Duncan.

== Posting up ==
LeBron James posts up Kobe Bryant, February 2016

To "post up" is to establish a position in the low post, the area near the basket below the foul line, usually in order to take advantage of a smaller defender. The offensive player usually faces away from the basket, so that their body can protect the ball from being stolen by the defender. From this position, options such as spinning or backing down the defender (to close-in on the basket, for easier scoring opportunities) then becomes available.

=== Up and under ===
The up and under is a move consisting of two parts: a shot fake (the up) and a step-through (the under). First the player with the ball fakes a shot by thrusting the ball above their head as if to take a shot, then when the defender jumps in an attempt to block the shot, the offensive player steps by them and attempts a clear, unguarded shot.

Generally used by post players (power forwards and centers), Hakeem Olajuwon and Kevin McHale were considered masters of this move.

=== Hook shot ===
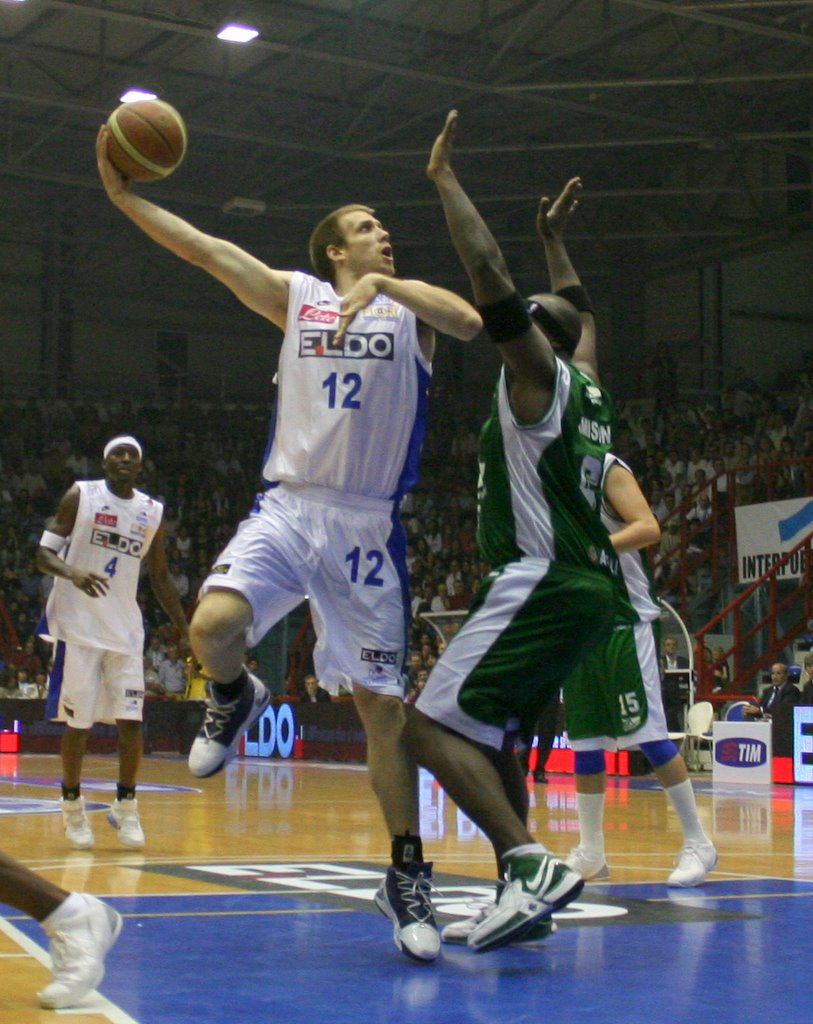
Mason Rocca making a hook shot for Eldo Napoli, 2006

The hook shot is one of the most effective inside moves, but it is also quite difficult to execute. A hook shot begins when the player puts their body between the ball and the opponent. They then release the ball towards the basket with their outside hand in a "hook" motion. The hook shot and variations such as the jump-hook and skyhook are effective because they are very difficult for the defender to block, although it is harder to hit the shot with precision. The advantage the hook shot offers is the space it creates between the offensive player and their defender. This extra space can reduce or eliminate the advantages enjoyed by a taller defender. The hook shot is most often used by post players because it is difficult to make the shot from a distance. Kareem Abdul-Jabbar became the NBA's all-time leading scorer by using his indefensible skyhook and maintained this status until his record was broken by Lebron James after nearly 39 years.

=== Drop step ===
Also called a reverse pivot, the drop step is a move in which the player posting up takes a back step on the side of a defender behind them and spins to that side to gain leverage.

=== Power move ===
The power move is executed by pivoting towards the basket to seal the defender, then using a two handed power dribble followed by a jump stop to get closer to the basket. Immediately after the jump stop the player jumps up for a power shot or jump hook.

=== Spin and drive ===
When the offensive player receives the ball in the low post, the player either fakes in one direction and then spins in the opposite direction, or immediately after catching the ball, the player spins around the defender and goes up for the shot or takes one hard dribble and then takes the shot.

=== Sikma move ===
Named after Jack Sikma, the post player receives the ball with their back to the basket and keeps the ball at forehead level. The post then pivots to face the basket while bringing the ball overhead (almost behind the head) to shoot a jump shot. The ball is released high over the head making it difficult for the defense to block.

=== Dream shake ===
Named after Hakeem "The Dream" Olajuwon, this move is executed when a post player dribbles alongside the baseline and with one hand under the ball fakes a layup, then pivots to the outside for a jump hook. If the defender recovers and jumps at the hook shot, the post player can pump fake the hook and step through for the unguarded layup (similar to the up and under move).

== Shooting ==
=== Pull-up jumper ===
A pull-up jumper is an offensive move, where the ball handler in the act of dribbling, 'pulls up' to shoot the basketball. This is especially effective as the defender is not able to react in time to affect or block the shot. This move is widely used by many players in the NBA, including notable stars such as Jerry West, Tracy McGrady, DeMar DeRozan, Russell Westbrook, Stephen Curry, Kevin Durant, and LeBron James.

=== Turnaround jump shot ===
When a player posts up, they must turn around to face the basket in order to shoot. This can be done by turning in the air, timing the jump shot when the defender is not likely to jump and challenge the shot. Though a fade-away version of this move was perfected by Larry Bird and Dirk Nowitzki, players such as Michael Jordan, Kobe Bryant, Elgin Baylor, Elvin Hayes, Hakeem Olajuwon, and Kevin Garnett are also well known for it.

=== Fadeaway ===
A fadeaway shot is a variation on a set jump shot in which the shooter attempts their shot leaning backward, creating the effect of "fading away" from their defender. This makes it more difficult for the defender to contest the shot. The fadeaway usually has less range than a regular jump shot, because the ball has backwards momentum due to its inertia, making it somewhat tougher to project the ball over long distances. Also you have to kick one leg forward because if you leave both feet pointing down while fading away you might lose balance in shooting the ball or bend your upper body to the side after the shot. Michael Jordan, LeBron James, Reggie Miller, Kobe Bryant, Dwyane Wade, Dirk Nowitzki, Karl Malone, Steve Nash, and DeMar DeRozan are famous for their use of the fadeaway. Wilt Chamberlain was criticized for his frequent use of the fadeaway jumper, since the follow-through usually carries the shooter away from the basket and out of rebounding position.

=== Step-back jump shot ===
The shooter takes a quick jab step away from the basket and takes a normal jump shot. Stephen Curry, James Harden and Luka Dončić are famous for their step-back jumper. The move creates space for the shot, while providing more balance than the fadeaway.

== Passes ==
=== Inbound pass ===
The inbound pass or throw-in is used to restart play after the ball has gone out of bounds, after a successful field goal or free throw by the opposing team, or after a non-shooting foul. Throw-ins are difficult to defend against and so are not usually strongly contested except in the last few minutes of a close game. A long pass may be used if time is running out on the clock.

=== Bounce pass ===
The bounce pass is a fundamental and very effective passing technique. This pass consists of one player passing the ball to a teammate by bouncing the ball off the floor. Because the ball will be at ground level as it passes a defender, a successful bounce pass can easily result in a scoring assist because a bounce pass is harder for defenders to steal. Still, a bounce pass may be stolen due to its slower speed. A player must use their best judgment when they decide whether to make such a pass.

=== Chest pass ===
This pass is performed best if the player steps towards their target with one foot, then throws the ball out towards their chest with two hands while turning the hands over, ending with the thumbs pointing down. It is best used in an open court and on the perimeter.

=== Over-the-head pass ===
An over-the-head pass is another fundamental passing technique. It is used by snapping the ball over the head, like a soccer throw-in. This pass is especially effective in helping to initiate a fast break. After a defensive rebound, a well-thrown overhead, or outlet, pass can allow a breaking offensive player to quickly score without even dribbling by catching the ball near the basket.

=== Touch pass ===
A touch pass is an advanced passing technique in which a prior pass or a loose ball is immediately redirected to another player by tipping or slapping the ball. This is the quickest pass in basketball and is therefore very effective when executed correctly.

=== Baseball pass ===
The baseball pass is a long pass in which the passer throws the ball with one hand, as if it were a baseball or an American football. It is infrequently used, mainly to set up last-second plays off a baseline inbounding situation.

=== Jump pass ===
A jump pass is a pass performed while the passing player's feet are off the floor. When done intentionally, usually when a teammate gets open during the shot, it can sometimes confuse the defender, causing them to believe that the passer is shooting instead of passing. At times, however, it is done as a result of the player having their shooting lane blocked and often leads to the player turning the ball over to the opposing team. This kind of pass is risky to execute, and the chances of perfectly passing the ball to an open teammate are considerably low, as it leaves the offensive player very vulnerable to turnovers.

=== Blind pass ===
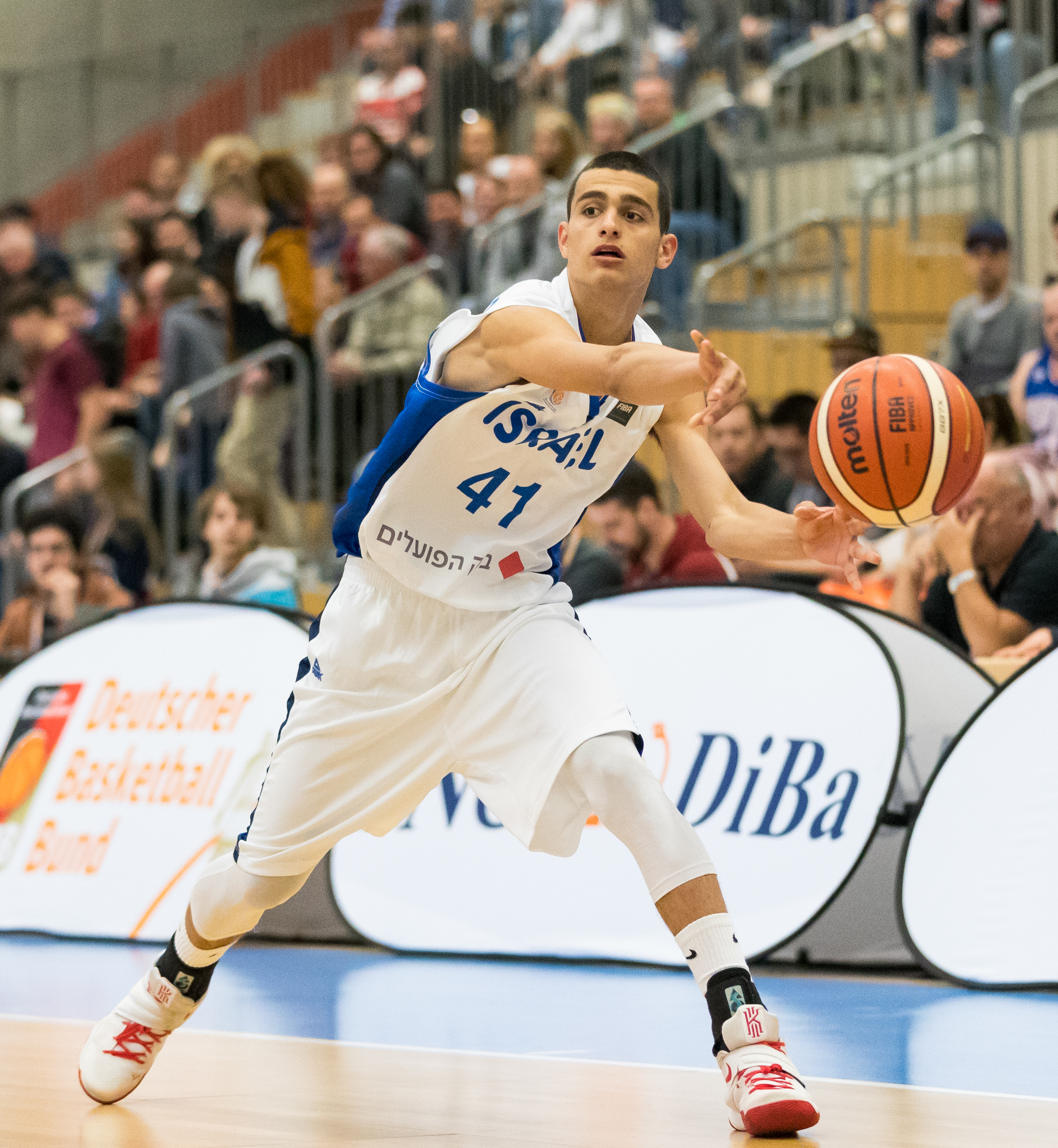
Israeli basketball player Yam Madar making a blind pass.

Also known as a no-look pass, the blind pass is performed when a player looks in one direction but passes the ball to their target in another direction. Blind passes are risky and infrequently attempted, but when done correctly, they can confuse the defense. The no-look pass has been popularized by players such as Bob Cousy, Magic Johnson, Isiah Thomas, Pete Maravich, Larry Bird, Jason Kidd, Rajon Rondo, Michael Jordan, John Stockton, Ricky Rubio, Jason Williams, and Steve Nash.

=== Behind-the-back pass ===
Behind-the-back passes are passes dealt to a target behind the passer's back. Usually done to confuse the defender, behind-the-back passes can either be bounced off the floor or passed directly to a teammate's chest. However, most behind-the-back passes are direct. Earl Monroe was famous for this move. Steve Nash used this move often, and Chris Webber is famed for using this move down in the paint.

== Two-person play ==
=== Give and go ===
A give and go is an offensive play that involves passing the ball (give) and then running (go) to an open spot to receive the ball back, usually near the basket, for an easy score. This play can be effective when the defender pays too much attention to the ball instead of the player who moves after passing the ball. This is also known as a "One-Two" in street ball.

=== Dribble pitch (handoff) ===
The dribble pitch (or the handoff) is an offensive play whereby the ball-handler passes to a player (often a bigger player) and runs by them to collect the ball, whilst the big sets a screen.

=== Pick and roll ===
A pick and roll is an offensive play in which a player stops to screen (block) a defender for the teammate handling the ball and then slips behind the defender to accept a pass as the handler makes a move towards the basket. In the NBA, John Stockton and Karl Malone were a quintessential pick and roll tandem and used this play to great effect in the 1990s. Steve Nash and Amar'e Stoudemire proved to be extremely effective at the pick and roll throughout the 2000s. Kyrie Irving, LeBron James, Blake Griffin, and Chris Paul were considered among the best contemporary pick and roll tandems.

From the initial position of the pick-and-roll maneuver, the player who receives the ball has many different options as to whether they pass it, or fake and then go for a jump shot. These variations typically include the pick and pop, where by the roll man instead of heading to the basket trails behind and is wide open for a jumper, hence the 'pop', as well as slipping the screen, whereby the defender of the screener attempts to cheat and get ahead of the screener, at which point the screener does not set a screen, but merely slips by, leaving them open as their defender trails behind.

=== Backdoor ===
A backdoor play is when a player without the ball gets behind the defense and receives a pass for an easy score. This can be executed if the defenders are unaware of the open space behind them. Also, when a defender strongly commits on defense (e.g. tries to steal or deny a pass), they are vulnerable to a backdoor play.

=== Alley-oop ===
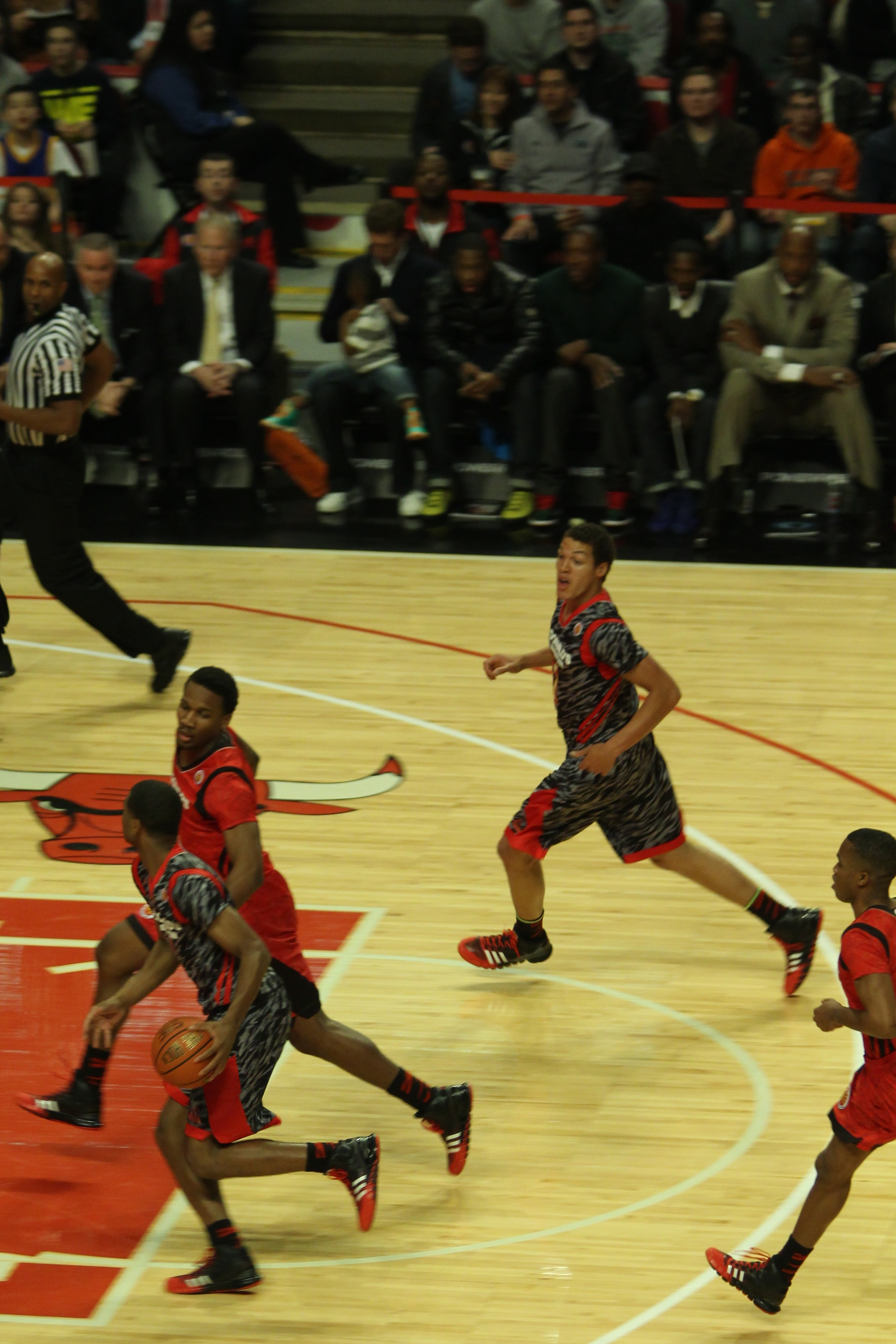
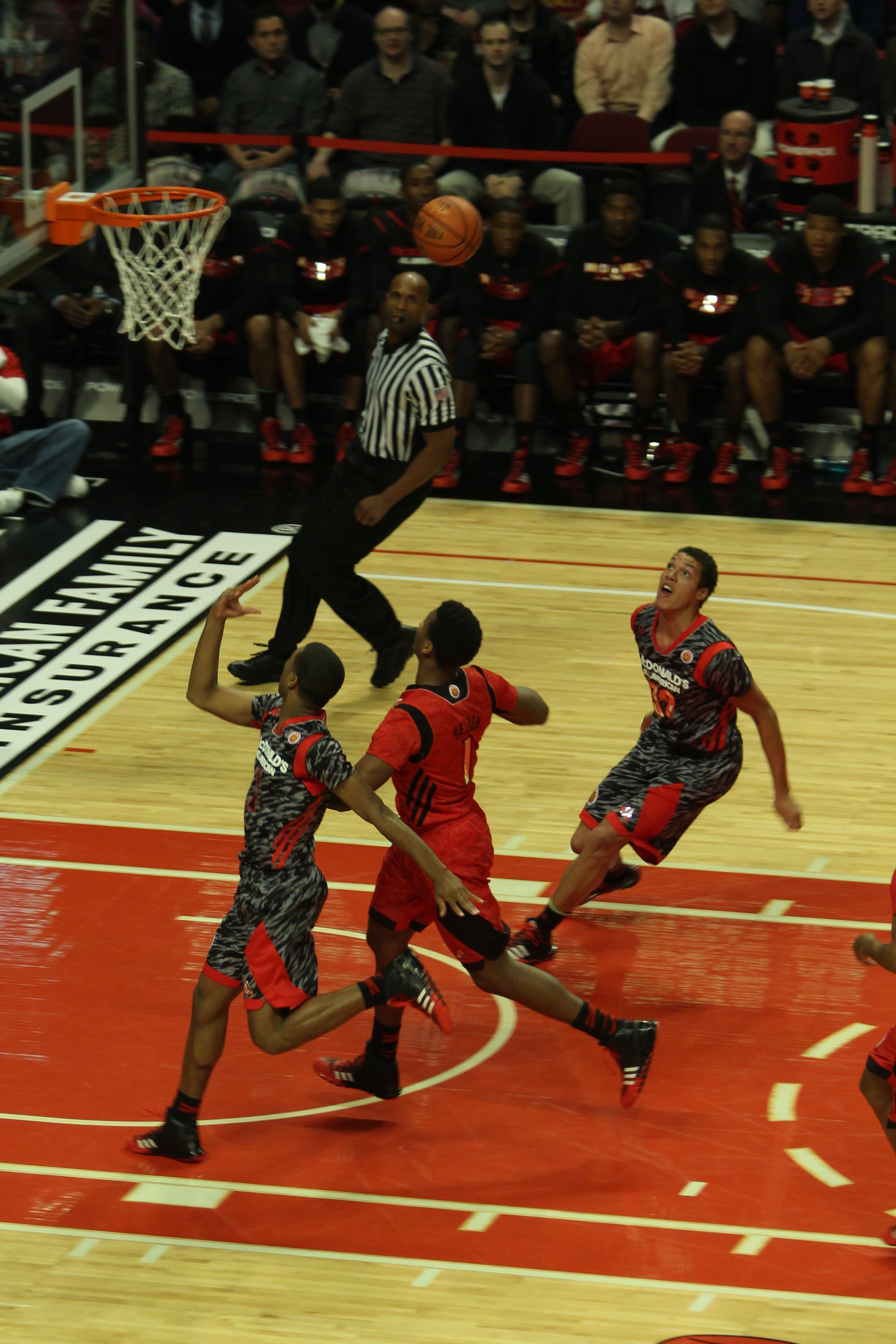
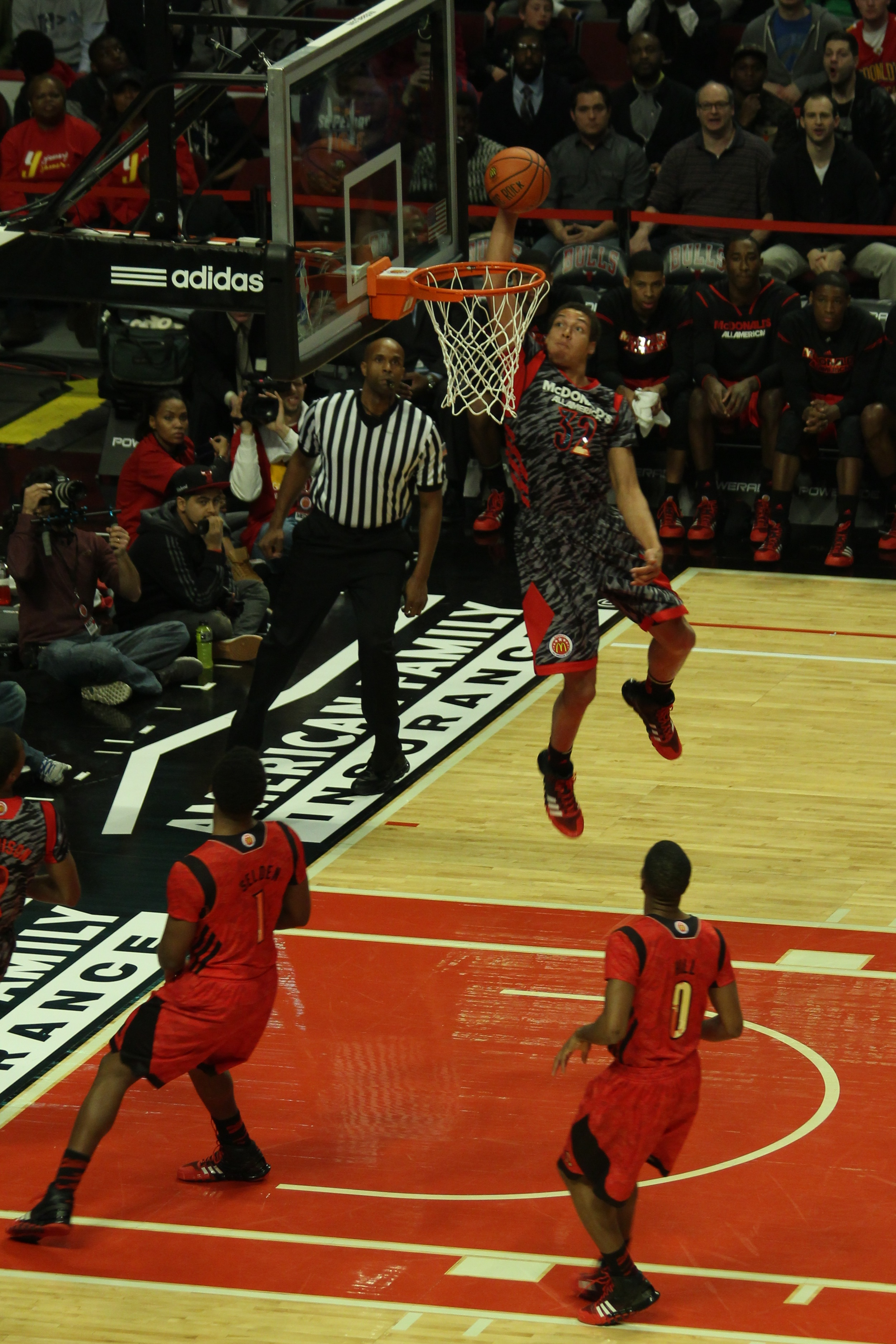
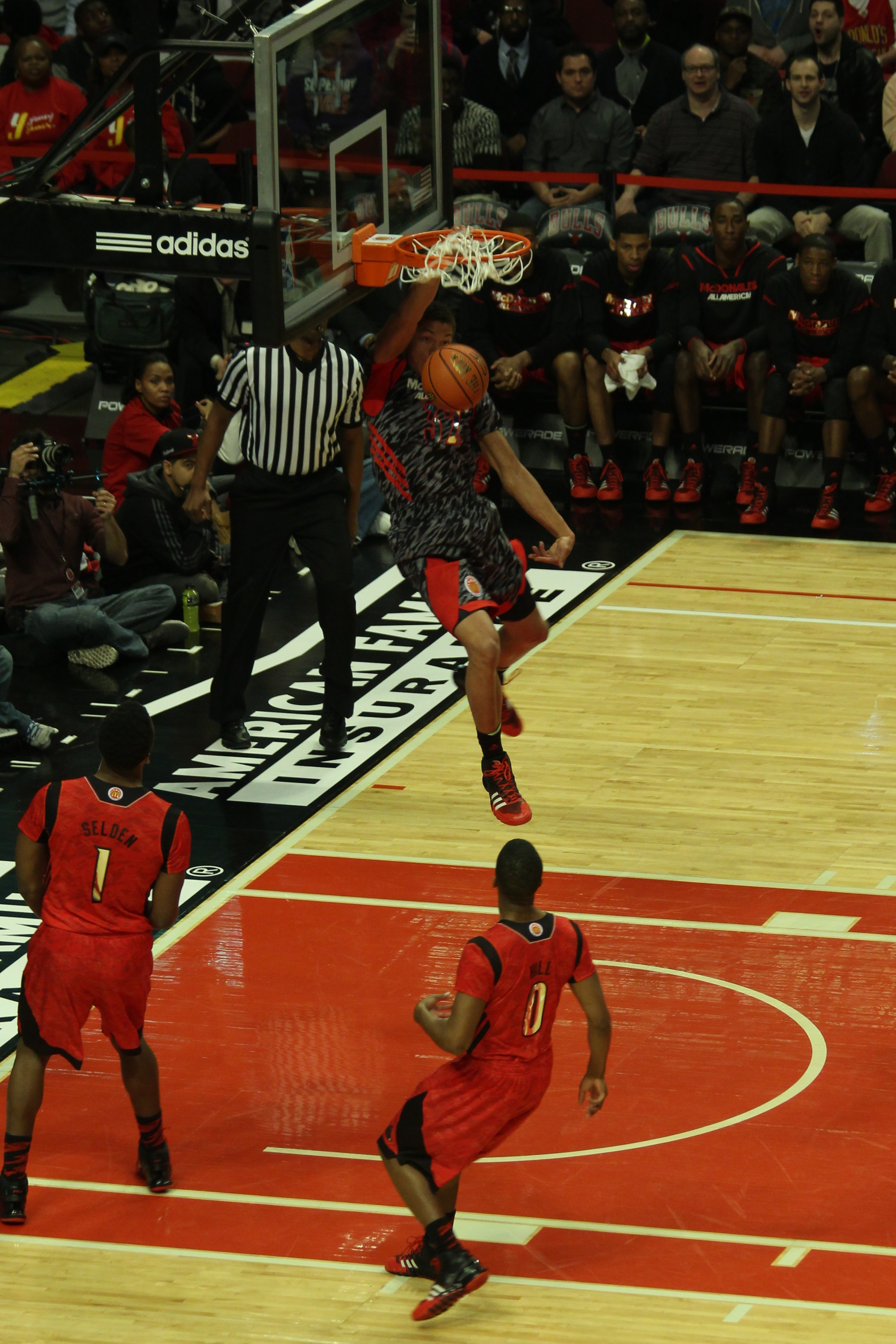
Aaron Harrison assists on an Aaron Gordon alley-oop at the 2013 McDonald's All-American Boys Game

An alley-oop is an offensive play which involves one teammate lofting the ball up near the rim in anticipation of another teammate jumping up to catch and dunk it. Because this move requires both teammates to know what the other is thinking, the alley-oop is a rare and exciting play. The alley-oop first dates back to the mid-1950s when K. C. Jones and Bill Russell teamed up to perform it while they were college teammates. Point guard Chris Paul, and big men Blake Griffin and DeAndre Jordan, were known for their spectacular alley-oops; during their shared time with the Los Angeles Clippers their team earned the name "Lob City." Another notable duo known for using this play is LeBron James and Dwyane Wade during their time with the Miami Heat.

=== Pass and chase ===
Pass and chase is when a player passes the ball to another teammate and immediately follows the pass in order to pick and roll, slip by, accept a handoff back, or perform another basketball move.

== See also ==
- List of NBA regular season records
- Association football tactics and skills
