= Pump fake =

Faked pass attempt in basketball and American football

In sports, a pump fake is a feigned attempt to pass (in football) or shoot (in basketball) the ball.

== Football ==
In gridiron football, a pump fake is a move by the quarterback to deceive the defense. It entails the movement of the arm so as to fool the defense into thinking the quarterback is throwing.

== Basketball ==
In basketball, a pump fake is also known as a shot fake, and usually involves a jump shot, restrained before the feet leave the ground (if the feet leave the ground but the ball remains in the player's hands after landing, it is considered a travel). The pump fake is a fundamental move in basketball, used to cause defenders to jump (known in basketball slang as "lifting" the defender) or be shifted off-balance. Its main applications are in the low post area, where a player is much more likely to have his or her shot blocked. On the perimeter, it is useful in creating open lanes to the basket by "showing" the ball enough to entice a defender to attempt to block or steal it, allowing the dribbler to penetrate easily.

== See also ==
- Basketball moves
