= 2008 AAFL draft =

The 2008 All American Football League draft took place in Atlanta, Georgia, on January 26, 2008. It was used to stock the six teams that were to play the league's 2008 season, which was ultimately canceled. The draft was effectively voided when the league announced it would pick new host markets for its inaugural season, which was scheduled for spring 2011.

== Draft rules ==
=== Time allowed ===
For rounds 1 and 2, each team is allowed 4 minutes per selection. For rounds 3 and 4, each team is allowed 3 minutes per selection. For round 5, each team is allowed 2 minutes per selection.

=== Draft order ===
In odd-numbered rounds (1, 3, 5, 7, 9, 11 and 13), teams will go by in the regular draft order. For even-numbered rounds (2, 4, 6, 8, 10 and 12), teams will go by the reverse order of the odd-numbered rounds.

=== Draft eligibility ===
- Players must have attended a combine, workout or tryout, or player must have a written scouting report from an AAFL coach or League personnel on file at the League office.
- Player must have signed an AAFL Draft Eligible Player Agreement.
- Player must have verification of a college degree (official transcript) on file at the League office.

=== "Protected" players ===
Each team was permitted to designate a number of "protected" players from schools within their area. These players counted towards the middle rounds of the 50-round draft.

== The draft ==
=== Round 1 ===
| Team | Player picked | Overall pick | Position |
|---|---|---|---|
| Arkansas | Zarah Yisrael | 1 | OL |
| Tennessee | Bryan Randall | 2 | QB |
| Texas | Eric Crouch | 3 | QB |
| Florida | Eric Kresser | 4 | QB |
| Michigan | David Koral | 5 | QB |
| Alabama | Josh Sewell | 6 | OL |

=== Round 2 ===
| Team | Player picked | Overall pick | Position |
|---|---|---|---|
| Alabama | Scott Scharff | 7 | DL |
| Michigan | Rodney Wormley | 8 | DL |
| Florida | Thomas Smith | 9 | DL |
| Texas | Freddie McCutcheon | 10 | DT |
| Tennessee | Tim Sandidge | 11 | DL |
| Arkansas | Nicholas Rogers | 12 | DL |

=== Round 3 ===
| Team | Player picked | Overall pick | Position |
|---|---|---|---|
| Arkansas | Albert Means | 13 | DL |
| Tennessee | Pete Traynor | 14 | OL |
| Texas | Aaron Cotteral | 15 | LB |
| Florida | John Wilson | 16 | OL |
| Michigan | Gerome Castleberry | 17 | RB |
| Alabama | Ben Brielmaier | 18 | DL |

=== Round 4 ===
| Team | Player picked | Overall pick | Position |
|---|---|---|---|
| Alabama | Daryl Whittington | 19 | DL |
| Michigan | Kevin Youngblood | 20 | WR |
| Florida | Pete Hunter | 21 | CB |
| Texas | Akieem Jola | 22 | WR |
| Tennessee | Derrius Monroe | 23 | DL |
| Arkansas | Mike Erickson | 24 | OL |

=== Round 5 ===
| Team | Player picked | Overall pick | Position |
|---|---|---|---|
| Arkansas | Alfred Peterson | 25 | DL |
| Tennessee | Joel Clinger | 26 | OL |
| Texas | Dwight Ellick | 27 | CB |
| Florida | James Lemon | 28 | RB |
| Michigan | Sameeh McDonald | 29 | OL |
| Alabama | Alex Obomese | 30 | DL |

=== Round 6 ===
| Team | Player picked | Overall pick | Position |
|---|---|---|---|
| Alabama | Nicholas Smith | 31 | OL |
| Michigan | Jahkeen Gilmour | 32 | WR |
| Florida | Chris Leak | 33 | QB |
| Texas | Chris Bowser | 34 | OL |
| Tennessee | Bobby Blizzard | 35 | TE |
| Arkansas | Jhun Cook | 36 | WR |

=== Round 7 ===
| Team | Player picked | Overall pick | Position |
|---|---|---|---|
| Arkansas | Matt Mitrione | 37 | DL |
| Tennessee | Darnerien McCants | 38 | WR |
| Texas | Lawrence Wilson | 39 | DL |
| Florida | Peter Warrick | 40 | WR |
| Michigan | Roye Oliver | 41 | DB |
| Alabama | Grant Steen | 42 | LB |

=== Round 8 ===
| Team | Player picked | Overall pick | Position |
|---|---|---|---|
| Alabama | Antwaun Carter | 43 | RB |
| Michigan | Casey Camero | 44 | DL |
| Florida | Willie Jackson | 45 | WR |
| Texas | Akilah Lacey | 46 | WR |
| Tennessee | Richard Koonce Jr. | 47 | LB |
| Arkansas | David Freeman | 48 | RB |

=== Round 9 ===
| Team | Player picked | Overall pick | Position |
|---|---|---|---|
| Arkansas | Aubrey Dorime | 49 | DLE |
| Tennessee | Ryan Durner | 50 | TE |
| Texas | Keith Brooks | 51 | FB |
| Florida | Craig Kobel | 52 | LB |
| Michigan | Deyon Williams | 53 | WR |
| Alabama | Terrence Robinson | 54 | LB |

=== Round 10 ===
| Team | Player picked | Overall pick | Position |
|---|---|---|---|
| Alabama | Nathan Bennett | 55 | T |
| Michigan | Devraun Thompson | 56 | LB |
| Florida | Travis McGriff | 57 | WR |
| Texas | Willie Amos | 58 | DBF |
| Tennessee | Abraham Elimimian | 59 | DBC |
| Arkansas | Lee Davis | 60 | T |

=== Round 11 ===
| Team | Player picked | Overall pick | Position |
|---|---|---|---|
| Arkansas | Russell Stuvaints | 61 | S |
| Tennessee | Reginald Doucet | 62 | DBC |
| Texas | John Simon | 63 | RB |
| Florida | Tavaris Capers | 64 | WR |
| Michigan | Ken West | 65 | DLE |
| Alabama | Jared Newberry | 66 | LB |

=== Round 12 ===
| Team | Player picked | Overall pick | Position |
|---|---|---|---|
| Alabama | Travis Manigan | 67 | T |
| Michigan | Darnell Robinson | 68 | LB |
| Florida | Ryan Moore | 69 | WR |
| Texas | Wes Bautovich | 70 | S |
| Tennessee | Thadis Pegues II | 71 | DLE |
| Arkansas | Kent Smith | 72 | QB |

=== Round 13 ===
| Team | Player picked | Overall pick | Position |
|---|---|---|---|
| Arkansas | James Thornton | 73 | RB |
| Tennessee | Darrell Dowery | 74 | WR |
| Texas | William Blaylock | 75 | G |
| Florida | Chris Doering | 76 | WR |
| Michigan | Joshua Tinch | 77 | WR |
| Alabama | Robert Ortiz | 78 | WR |

=== Round 14 ===
| Team | Player picked | Overall pick | Position |
|---|---|---|---|
| Alabama | Reginald Myles | 79 | C |
| Michigan | Rayshawn Askew | 80 | RB |
| Florida | Elijah Williams | 81 | RB |
| Texas | Eric Buchanan | 82 | S |
| Tennessee | Nick Hannah | 83 | S |
| Arkansas | Clint Stoerner | 84 | QB |
