= Wes Bautovich =

American football player (born 1979)

No. 30
- Positions: Quarterback, safety, linebacker

Personal information
- Born: August 18, 1979 (age 47); Kennedale, Texas, U.S.
- Listed height: 6 ft 2 in (1.88 m)
- Listed weight: 210 lb (95 kg)

Career information
- College: Texas A&M-Kingsville; Texas A&M

Career history
- 2003: New York Jets
- 2004: Rhein Fire
- 2008: Team Texas (AAFL)

Wes Bautovich (born August 18, 1979) is an American former football quarterback and safety for Texas A&M University-Kingsville and Texas A&M University. He played briefly for the National Football League's New York Jets.

== Early life ==
Bautovich attended Kennedale High School in Kennedale, Texas, and was a letterman in football, baseball, basketball, and track. In football, as a senior, he was named the district's offensive MVP.

== College career ==
Bautovich signed with Texas A&M University–Kingsville and was a redshirt during the 1997 season. He was the Javelina's starting quarterback for six games in 1998. That season, he completed 53 of 118 passes for 754 yards and eight touchdowns. He also rushed for 366 yards and scored six touchdowns on the ground.

In 1999, Bautovich enrolled at Texas A&M and joined the team as a walk-on, serving as a scout team quarterback and wide receiver for that season. With the Aggies deep at quarterback but thin at safety, A&M coaches approached Bautovich about moving to the defensive side of the ball during spring practice in 2000.

Bautovich made an immediate impact playing in the season opener at Notre Dame and then made two starts against Wyoming and UTEP in place of injured free safety Michael Jameson. Overall, he played in every game and made three starts in 2000, recording 45 tackles—eighth best on the team—and breaking up seven passes. During the 2000 season, Bautovich was also awarded a scholarship.

In 2001, Bautovich also received considerable playing time, including a career best 18 tackles against Kansas State. In total, he tallied 104 tackles, two interceptions and 10 passes defensed in two seasons for the Aggies.

== Professional career ==
Although Bautovich went undrafted, he played in the preseason with the New York Jets, even returning a Carson Palmer interception 78 yards for a touchdown. Bautovich was cut by the Jets who allocated him to the Rhein Fire of NFL Europa, where he played linebacker and recorded 15 tackles and a forced fumble. On January 26, 2008, he was drafted in the 12th round by Team Texas in the AAFL draft, but the season was ultimately canceled.
