= Rick Pitino =

American basketball coach (born 1952)

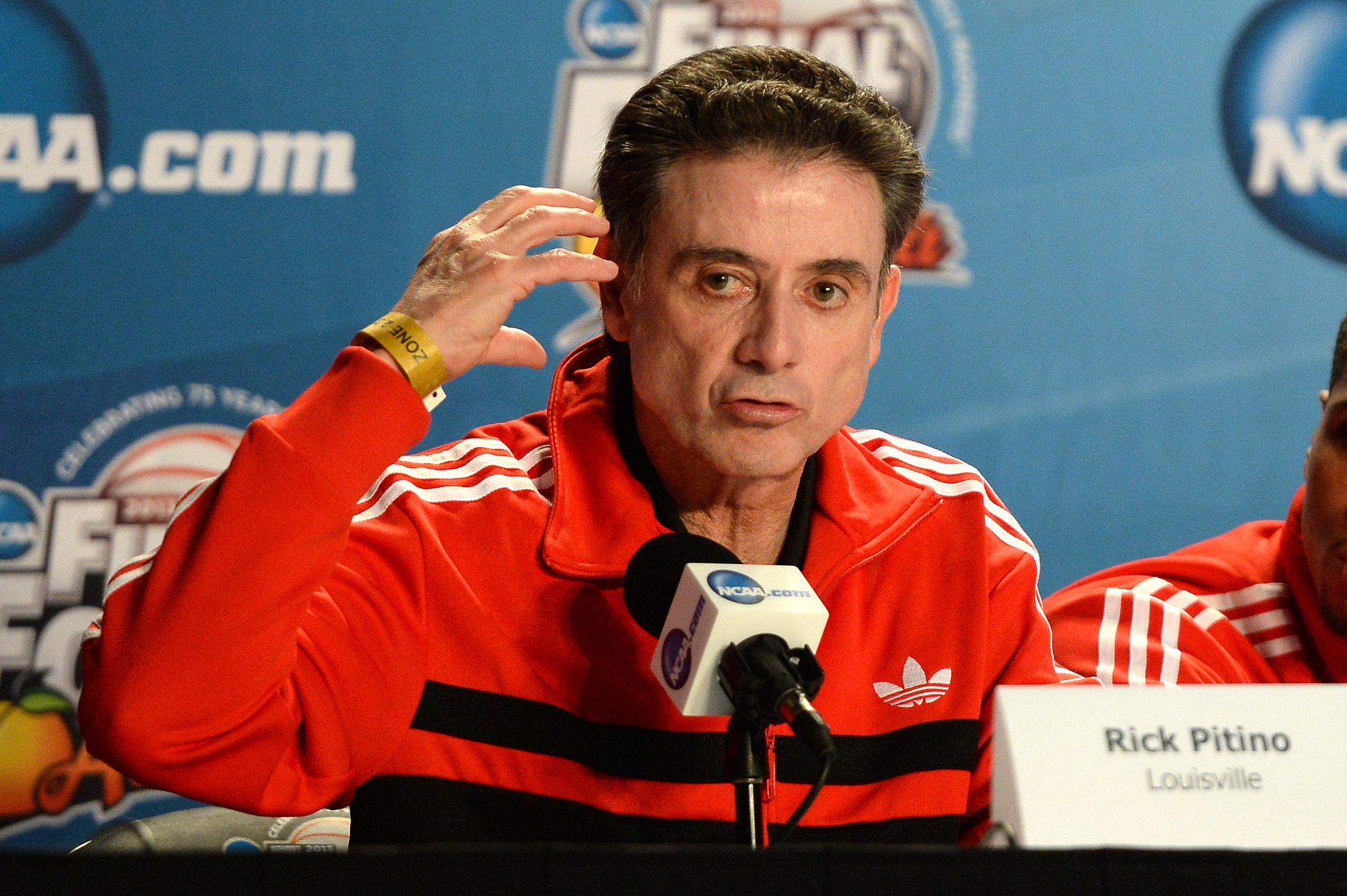
- Pitino in a press conference for the 2013 Final Four

Current position
- Title: Head coach
- Team: St. John's
- Conference: Big East
- Record: 86–25 (.775)

Biographical details
- Born: September 18, 1952 (age 74); New York City, New York, U.S.

Playing career
- 1971–1974: UMass
- Position: Point guard

Coaching career (HC unless noted)
- 1974–1976: Hawaii (assistant)
- 1976: Hawaii (interim HC)
- 1976–1978: Syracuse (assistant)
- 1978–1983: Boston University
- 1983–1985: New York Knicks (assistant)
- 1985–1987: Providence
- 1987–1989: New York Knicks
- 1989–1997: Kentucky
- 1997–2001: Boston Celtics
- 2001–2017: Louisville
- 2018–2020: Panathinaikos
- 2019–2021: Greece
- 2020–2023: Iona
- 2023–present: St. John's

Head coaching record
- Overall: 920–318 (.743) (Note: In 2018, the NCAA vacated 123 wins and three losses from Pitino's record, making his official NCAA record 797–315 (.717).) (college); 192–220 (.466) (NBA)
- Tournaments: 55–23 (NCAA Division I); 6–5 (NIT)

Accomplishments and honors

Championships
- 2 NCAA Division I tournament (1996, 2013*); 7 NCAA Division I regional – Final Four (1987, 1993, 1996, 1997, 2005, 2012*, 2013*); America East tournament (1983); 2 America East regular season (1980, 1983); 5 SEC tournament (1992–1995, 1997); 2 SEC regular season (1995, 1996); 2 C-USA tournament (2003, 2005); C-USA regular season (2005); 5 Big East tournament (2009, 2012*, 2013*, 2025, 2026); 4 Big East regular season (2009, 2013*, 2025, 2026); AAC tournament (2014*); AAC regular season (2014*); Greek Cup (2019); 2 Greek League (2019, 2020); 2 MAAC tournament (2021, 2023); 2 MAAC regular season (2022, 2023)

Awards
- AP Coach of the Year (2025); Henry Iba Award (2025); NABC Coach of the Year (1987); John Wooden National Coach of the Year (1987); Adolph Rupp Cup (2009); 3× SEC Coach of the Year (1990, 1991, 1996); C-USA Coach of the Year (2005); 2× MAAC Coach of the Year (2022, 2023); Big East Coach of the Year (2025); * Vacated by the NCAA
- Basketball Hall of Fame; Inducted in 2013 (profile)

Richard Andrew Pitino (/pɪˈtiːnoʊ/; born September 18, 1952) is an American basketball coach who is the head men's basketball coach at St. John's University. He has been the head coach of several teams in NCAA Division I and in the NBA, including Boston University (1978–1983), Providence College (1985–1987), the New York Knicks (1987–1989), the University of Kentucky (1989–1997), the Boston Celtics (1997–2001), the University of Louisville (2001–2017), Panathinaikos of the Greek Basket League and EuroLeague (2018–2020), and Iona University (2020–2023). He was also the head coach of Greece's senior national team.

Pitino led Kentucky to an NCAA championship in 1996. In 2013, his Louisville team won the national championship and he was elected to the Naismith Memorial Basketball Hall of Fame.

In June 2017, the NCAA suspended Pitino for five games of the 2017–18 season for a perceived lack of oversight in an escort sex scandal at the University of Louisville involving recruits. Louisville's national championship from 2013 was eventually vacated, and the university's appeal was denied. In September, Pitino was implicated in a separate federal investigation involving bribes to recruits, which resulted in Louisville firing him for cause. He soon returned to coaching after a brief stint as a broadcaster, and was later exonerated of the bribery accusation.

On March 20, 2023, he was named head basketball coach at St. John's University. Since taking over at St. John's, Pitino has led the program to back-to-back Big East regular season and tournament championships in 2025 and 2026.

== Early life and education ==
Pitino was born in New York City, and was raised in Bayville, New York, on Long Island. He was the team captain of the St. Dominic High School basketball team in Oyster Bay, Long Island.

Pitino enrolled at the University of Massachusetts Amherst in 1970. At a listed height of 1.83 metres (6 feet 0 inches) tall, he was a point guard for the Minutemen basketball team. Pitino held the tenth spot at UMass for career assists, with 329, until 2014. He led the team in assists as a junior and senior. The 168 assists as a senior is the eighth-best single season total ever there.

Pitino was a freshman at the same time future NBA legend Julius Erving spent his junior (and final) year at UMass, although the two never played on the same team because freshmen were ineligible to play varsity basketball at the time. Other teammates of Pitino's include Al Skinner, who also went on to become a successful college coach, and baseball player Mike Flanagan, who went on to pitch in the major leagues and win the AL Cy Young Award in 1979. Pitino earned his degree from UMass in 1974.

== Career ==
=== University of Hawaii (1974–1976) ===
Pitino started his coaching career as a graduate assistant at the University of Hawaii in 1974, and became a full-time assistant in 1975. Pitino served as Hawaii's interim head coach late in the 1975–76 season. Coach Bruce O'Neil was fired after the Rainbow Warriors started the season 9–12. Pitino led Hawaii for their final six games, going 2–4 in the span.

==== Scandal and investigation ====
Pitino's time at Hawaii was marred by a 1977 NCAA report on sanctions against the program. According to the report, Pitino was implicated in 8 of the 64 infractions that led the university to be placed on probation. The violations involving Pitino included providing round-trip air fare for a player between New York and Honolulu, arranging for student-athletes to receive used cars for season tickets, and handing out coupons to players for free food at McDonald's. He was also cited, along with the head coach, Bruce O'Neil, for providing misinformation to the NCAA and University of Hawaii officials. Also in 1977, the NCAA infractions committee recommended that Pitino and O'Neil be dissociated from Hawaii athletics. In 1989, Pitino would dismiss the report, saying "I didn't make any mistakes. I don't care what anybody says."

=== Syracuse (1976–1978) ===
Pitino was the first assistant hired by Jim Boeheim in 1976 as Boeheim began his tenure at Syracuse University.

=== Boston University (1978–1983) ===
In 1978, Boston University athletic director John Simpson hired Pitino as head coach, funding the Terriers men's basketball team with $20,000 for recruiting players and fifteen full scholarships, the maximum allowed under NCAA rules and far more than prior head coach Roy Sigler was allotted. As compensation, Pitino received a Renault Le Car and an annual salary of $17,500.

In the two seasons before Pitino's arrival, the Terriers had won a mere 17 games. During his 5-year tenure, the team slogan was, "the hardest working coach, for the hardest working team in the country." Pitino used the full-court press for almost the entirety of each game, eventually leading the Terriers to their first NCAA tournament appearance in 24 years.

=== New York Knicks (1983–1985) ===
Pitino left Boston University to become an assistant coach with the New York Knicks under Hubie Brown.

=== Providence (1985–1987) ===
In 1985, Pitino returned to college coaching to become head coach at Providence College after being hired by athletic director Lou Lamoriello. Providence had gone a dismal 11–20 in the year before he took over. Two years later, Pitino led the team to the Final Four. The three-point field goal, previously permitted on a conference-by-conference basis and with no standard line distance, was nationally codified for the 1986–87 season and Pitino took full advantage of the new rule. The Friars attempted an average of 20 threes per game (nearly double their opposition) with the "Rainbow Coalition" backcourt of point guard Billy Donovan and shooting guard Delray Brooks both averaging better than 40% from beyond the arc. Both Brooks and Donovan went on to be assistant coaches under Pitino at the University of Kentucky; Donovan later won back-to-back national championships as head coach at the University of Florida.

=== New York Knicks (1987–1989) ===
Pitino became head coach of the New York Knicks on July 14, 1987. The year before he arrived, the team had only won 24 games. In just two years, Pitino led the Knicks to their first division title in nearly twenty years. He resigned from the Knicks on May 30, 1989.

=== Kentucky (1989–1997) ===
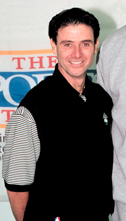
Pitino in 1999

After spending two years coaching in the NBA, Pitino returned to the college level again in 1989, becoming the coach at Kentucky. The Kentucky program was recovering from a major recruiting scandal brought on by former coach Eddie Sutton that left it on NCAA probation. Pitino quickly restored Kentucky's reputation and performance, leading his second school to the Final Four in the 1993 NCAA tournament, and winning a national title in the 1996 NCAA tournament, Kentucky's 6th NCAA Championship. The following year, Pitino's Kentucky team made it back to the national title game, losing to Arizona in overtime in the finals of the 1997 NCAA tournament. Pitino's fast-paced teams at Kentucky were favorites of the school's fans, implementing his signature style of full-court pressure defense. The following year, he left Kentucky for the NBA and Kentucky went on to win the 1998 national title. He would later refer to Kentucky as "the Roman Empire of college basketball".

=== Boston Celtics (1997–2001) ===
Pitino returned to the NBA in 1997 when the Boston Celtics hired him as head coach on May 6, 1997. He resigned on January 8, 2001. His NBA coaching experience often demonstrated a deep frustration with the dynamics of the league, especially in Boston, where he amassed a 102–146 record from 1997 to 2001. After being beaten by the Toronto Raptors on March 1, 2000, on a buzzer-beater by Vince Carter, Pitino's frustration reached critical mass as he addressed the press. Referring to the expectations of Boston Celtics fans and media, Pitino challenged each of them to let go of the past and focus on the future:

Larry Bird is not walking through that door, fans. Kevin McHale is not walking through that door, and Robert Parish is not walking through that door. And if you expect them to walk through that door, they're going to be gray and old. What we are is young, exciting, hard-working, and we're going to improve. People don't realize that, and as soon as they realize those three guys are not coming through that door, the better this town will be for all of us because there are young guys in that (locker) room playing their asses off. I wish we had $90 million under the salary cap. I wish we could buy the world. We can't; the only thing we can do is work hard, and all the negativity that's in this town sucks. I've been around when Jim Rice was booed. I've been around when Yastrzemski was booed. And it stinks. It makes the greatest town, greatest city in the world, lousy. The only thing that will turn this around is being upbeat and positive like we are in that locker room... and if you think I'm going to succumb to negativity, you're wrong. You've got the wrong guy leading this team.

Pitino struggled in Boston, and statistics like 1998–99's 19–31 record made him little better in the eyes of many Boston fans than his inexperienced predecessor, M. L. Carr. Pitino's remarks became a cornerstone of Celtics lore, and has served as a metaphor for other sports franchises and their inability to relive past successes. Pitino himself reprised the speech in a tongue-in-cheek manner at Louisville in November 2005, challenging his freshmen players to play as tough as past seniors and drawing laughter from sportswriters in a postgame press conference. During his time in Boston, he also served as team president, with complete control over basketball operations.

=== Louisville (2001–2017) ===
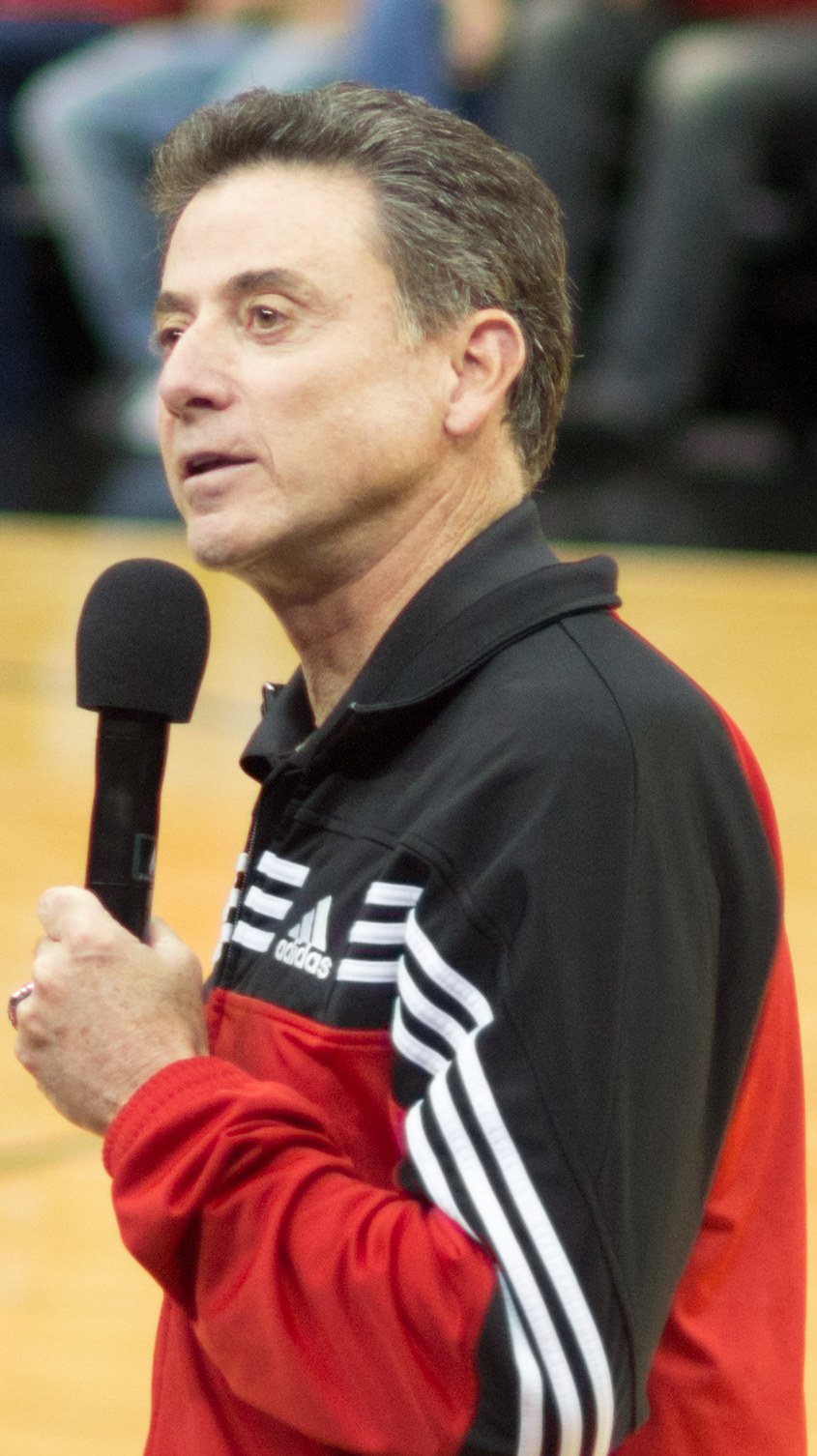
Pitino addresses the crowd before Louisville's 2012 Red-White Scrimmage

Pitino returned to college coaching on March 21, 2001, to become the head coach at the University of Louisville following the retirement of Hall of Fame coach Denny Crum. In the 2005 season, Pitino led Louisville to their first Final Four in 19 years, and became the first men's coach in NCAA history to lead three different schools to the Final Four. Immediately following their Final Four run, several players graduated or entered the 2005 NBA draft. The inexperience caused the Cardinals to limp into the Big East tournament seeded 12th, and miss the NCAA tournament. They made the semifinals of the National Invitation Tournament (NIT), where they were defeated by eventual champions University of South Carolina. The 2007 Cardinal team was primarily the same team, with added freshmen. Picked to finish towards the bottom of the Big East Conference again, Pitino led them to a second-place finish, 12–4 (tied with the University of Pittsburgh, who had been beaten by the Cardinals during the regular season) in the conference standings and a first round bye in the conference tournament. Pitino implemented a 2–2–1 and 2–3 zone defense midway through the season. The 2007 team's season ended when the Cardinals lost to Texas A&M in the second round of the NCAA tournament. The 2008 Cardinals finished second in the Big East and ranked 13th in both the AP and Coaches' polls. Louisville was the third seed in the 2008 NCAA tournament's East region. They defeated Boise State, Oklahoma and Tennessee to advance to the Elite Eight, where they were defeated by North Carolina. Louisville was the top seed overall in the 2009 NCAA tournament and was planted as the first seed in the Midwest region. They defeated Morehead State, Siena and Arizona to advance to the Elite Eight, where they were defeated by Michigan State. In 2010, the Cardinals suffered a disappointing 15-point loss to their first round opponent, the California Golden Bears. In 2011, Louisville was upset by 13th-seeded Morehead State in the second round of the NCAA Tournament.

In 2012, Pitino coached the Cardinals to the Big East tournament championship and a berth as No. 4 seed in the West region of the NCAA tournament. The Cardinals defeated Davidson, New Mexico, and top seed Michigan State to advance to the regional final against Florida and his former player and friend Billy Donovan. The Cardinals would go on to win that game, but lost to arch-rivals and eventual national champions Kentucky in the 2012 Final Four.

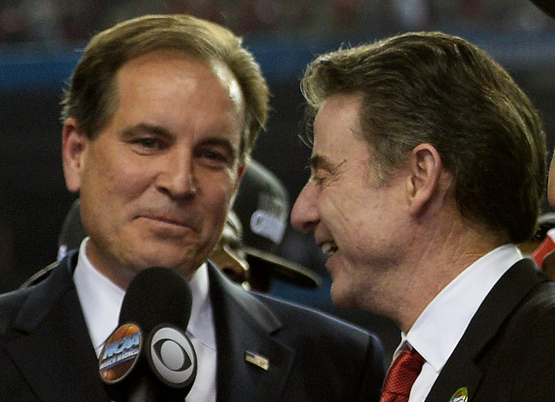
Pitino being interviewed by Jim Nantz following Louisville's victory in the 2013 NCAA Division I men's basketball championship game.

In 2013, Pitino led the Louisville Cardinals to their third national championship in an 82–76 win over Michigan to become the first NCAA Division I coach in history to win a championship with two different schools, although that championship was later vacated.

==== Scandals and ouster ====
The University of Louisville self-imposed a postseason ban for the 2015–16 season amid an ongoing NCAA investigation over an escort sex scandal involving recruits between 2010 and 2014. The ban included both the ACC tournament and the NCAA tournament. On June 15, 2017, the NCAA charged Pitino for failure to monitor his basketball program, which was involved in a sex-for-pay scandal. He was suspended for the first five games of the ACC season in 2017–18. On February 20, 2018, the NCAA officially announced that the 2013 National Championship and their 2012 Final Four appearance had been vacated. It was the first time the NCAA vacated a men's basketball national title.

On September 26, 2017, federal prosecutors announced that the school was under a separate investigation for an alleged "pay for play" involving recruits at Louisville. The allegations state that an Adidas executive conspired to pay $100,000 to the family of a top-ranked national recruit to play at Louisville and to represent Adidas when he turned pro. The criminal complaint did not name Louisville specifically but appeared to involve the recruitment of Brian Bowen, who committed on June 3, 2017, to the school.

A day later, Louisville placed Pitino on unpaid administrative leave, while athletic director Tom Jurich was placed on paid administrative leave. According to a letter interim president Greg Postel sent to Pitino, the information spelled out by prosecutors amounted to a "material breach" of his contract. Pitino's lawyer, former Kentucky Lieutenant Governor Steve Pence, told The Courier-Journal that as he understood it, Pitino had been "effectively fired". Under the terms of Pitino's contract, Louisville was required to give him 10 days' notice and "an opportunity to be heard" before firing him for cause. According to CBS Sports' Gary Parrish, school officials did not intend for Pitino to ever return to the sidelines again, and planned to cut ties with him as soon as they could legally do so.

On October 2, the board of the University of Louisville Athletic Association voted to formally begin the process of firing Pitino for cause. On the same day, Pitino, through his lawyer, claimed that Louisville officials should have given him 10 days notice and a chance to respond before placing him on leave. On October 16, the ULAA board voted unanimously to fire Pitino for cause.

On September 18, 2019, nearly two years after his dismissal and his lawsuit for $38.7 million against the ULAA, Pitino settled with the university and dropped the case. As a result, his termination was changed from a firing on October 16, 2017, to a resignation on October 3, 2017, citing "zero liability" between both parties. On November 3, 2022, the NCAA's Independent Accountability Review Process (IARP) board cleared Pitino of involvement in the bribery case, saying "the hearing panel determined no violation by former head coach No. 1 [Pitino] occurred given that he demonstrated he promoted an atmosphere of compliance."

=== Panathinaikos (2018–2020) ===
On December 26, 2018, Panathinaikos announced Pitino as the head coach of the team until the end of the season, marking his debut in the EuroLeague. On February 17, 2019, they won the 2018–19 Greek Cup against PAOK in the final. In the EuroLeague regular season, they managed to make a comeback after a 6–8 start, to finish in sixth place and reach the playoffs, after they registered ten wins in their last 16 games. In the EuroLeague Playoffs, Panathinaikos fell for a second consecutive year against defending champions Real Madrid, thus failing to qualify for the 2019 EuroLeague Final Four. The season ended with Panathinaikos winning the 2018–19 Greek Basket League's season championship, after they swept Promitheas Patras 3–0 in the League's Finals. After the season, Panathinaikos made an offer to coach Pitino to extend his stay, and although he showed willingness to stay in Greece for another season, he declined the offer, due to a family matter.

On November 26, 2019, Pitino was rehired by Panathinaikos as the team's head coach on a two-year deal after the firing of Argyris Pedoulakis. He remained with the team until March 2020 when the 2019–20 EuroLeague season was suspended due to the COVID-19 pandemic, leaving Panathinaikos at sixth place.

=== Iona (2020–2023) ===
On March 14, 2020, Pitino was named head coach of Iona College after Tim Cluess stepped down from the position due to health issues on March 13. Despite the hiring, Pitino was scheduled to finish his commitments to Panathinaikos; however, on March 20, Panathinaikos announced mutual agreement to terminate the contract.

The 2020–21 team was 6–3 in conference play for 9th in MAAC play but ran the table in the MAAC tournament with four upsets to reach the NCAA tournament and make Pitino the third coach ever to lead five different programs to the NCAA tournament. Pitino's squad won the regular season title in the next two seasons and won the MAAC tournament in Pitino's final season.

=== St. John's (2023–present) ===
On March 20, 2023, Pitino was named the head coach of St. John's, just a week after Mike Anderson was fired after four years. Prior to Pitino's appointment, the Red Storm had not won a Big East Conference championship since 2000, last reached the second weekend of the NCAA Tournament in 1999, and struggled with attendance at their spiritual home of Madison Square Garden. Pitino was recommended for the job by billionaire businessman and St. John's alumnus Mike Repole; the two had previously met through horse racing connections and Repole, who cited Pitino's book Success is a Choice as a personal favorite, promised an increase in student athlete compensation funding alongside the hire.

The Johnnies returned to local and national prominence with Pitino at the helm; in his second season St. John's won the Big East regular-season and tournament titles, beat rival UConn home and away, and posted their first 30-win season since their 1985 run to the Final Four. 2025–26 saw another 30-win season, repeating as Big East champions and earning a trip to the Sweet 16 of the NCAA Tournament following a dramatic last-second win over Kansas.

== National team career ==
=== Puerto Rico ===
On December 20, 2010, Pitino was hired as head coach of the senior Puerto Rico national team. On April 29, 2011, it was announced that Pitino would not coach the team, due to scheduling conflicts and NCAA regulations disallowing it. Pitino coached the Puerto Rican national team at the 2015 FIBA Americas Championship, in Mexico City, Mexico. They finished the tournament in 5th place.

=== Greece ===
On November 8, 2019, Pitino was hired as head coach of Greece's senior national team. The Hellenic Basketball Federation announced that Pitino would be Greece's head coach at the 2020 FIBA Victoria Olympic qualifying tournament and the 2020 Summer Olympics, should Greece qualify, while Thanasis Skourtopoulos would serve as Greece's head coach for the 2021 EuroBasket qualification tournament.

== Books ==
Pitino is the author of several books. He published an autobiography in 1988 entitled Born to Coach, describing his life up until his time with the Knicks. His book Rebound Rules, was the top seller at the 2008 Kentucky Book Fair. His most recent book, Pitino: My Story, was published in 2018. A detailed biography, it also delivers his version of events regarding the Adidas sneaker scandal and his subsequent ouster as the University of Louisville men's basketball coach.

- Born to Coach: A Season with the New York Knicks (1989, with Bill Reynolds)
- Full-Court Pressure: A Year in Kentucky Basketball (1996, with Dick Weiss)
- Success is a Choice (1997, with Bill Reynolds)
- Lead to Succeed: 10 Traits of Great Leadership in Business and Life (2000, with Bill Reynolds)
- Rebound Rules: The Art of Success 2.0 (2008, with Pat Forde)
- The One-Day Contract (2013, with Eric Crawford)
- Pitino: My Story (2018, with Seth Kaufman)

== Personal life ==
Pitino married the former Joanne Minardi in 1976. They have five living children, one of whom, Richard, became the head coach of the Xavier Musketeers in 2025. Their son, Daniel, died from congenital heart failure in 1987 at the age of six months. Rick and Joanne established the Daniel Pitino Foundation (along with a Daniel Pitino shelter in Owensboro, Kentucky) in his memory, which has raised millions of dollars for children in need.

In the terrorist attacks of September 11, 2001, Joanne's brother and Rick's closest friend, Billy Minardi, was working as a bond trader for Cantor Fitzgerald on the 105th floor of the north tower of the World Trade Center when it was struck by American Airlines Flight 11. Since 2002, the University of Louisville has designated a December home game as the Billy Minardi Classic, and the university named a dorm on campus as "Billy Minardi Hall". Only a few months earlier, another brother-in-law of Rick's, Don Vogt, was killed after being hit by a New York City cab.

=== Thoroughbred horse racing ===
Beyond basketball, Pitino has been involved in the sport of thoroughbred horse racing as the lead partner in Celtic Pride Stable and the Ol Memorial Stable. Among his notable horses have been A P Valentine and Halory Hunter. Pitino, through the stable name of RAP Racing, owns a 5 percent share of Goldencents. Goldencents, who won the $750,000 2013 Santa Anita Derby, ran in the 2013 Kentucky Derby and finished 17th.

=== Extortion attempt against Pitino ===
On April 18, 2009, Pitino announced that he was the target of an extortion attempt. On April 24, Karen Cunagin Sypher, the wife of Louisville equipment manager Tim Sypher, was arraigned and charged in US District Court with extortion and lying to federal agents. The federal government alleged that Sypher demanded vehicles and tuition money for her children from Pitino and later demanded $10 million from him. According to the federal complaint, the demands arose from an unspecified encounter between Sypher and Pitino.

On August 11, Pitino admitted that he had sexual relations with Sypher on August 1, 2003, at Porcini, a Louisville restaurant. Several weeks later, Sypher told Pitino that she was pregnant and wanted to have an abortion, but added she did not have health insurance. Pitino paid her $3,000 for the abortion. During the trial, Pitino downplayed the pair's sexual escapade, testifying that the entire act did not take more than 15 seconds. Sypher claimed that her estranged husband was paid to marry her.

At a press conference on August 12, Pitino apologized for his indiscretion and stated that he would remain as coach. While Pitino's contract allowed for his firing for "acts of moral depravity or misconduct that damages the university's reputation", University of Louisville president James Ramsey announced on August 13 that Pitino would remain in his position.

On August 6, 2010, a federal district court found Sypher guilty of extortion and lying to federal agents. She was eventually sentenced to 87 months in prison. Sypher was released to a halfway house in January 2017. After her conviction, Sypher hired new attorneys and accused the judge, prosecutors, her former attorneys, and Pitino of taking part in a conspiracy to ensure that she was found guilty. She later expressed "exceptional remorse and contrition regarding her commission of her offenses".

== Legacy ==
As a collegiate head coach, Pitino has compiled a 684–282 record, for a .708 winning percentage that is ranked 11th among active coaches and 34th all-time among all collegiate basketball coaches following the 2021–22 season.

In 2005, Pitino's Louisville team posted a tie for the most single-season wins in school history (33)—since surpassed by the 35 total wins by the 2013 NCAA title-winning Cardinals team—while he is one of two men's coaches in NCAA history to lead three separate schools (Providence, Kentucky, and Louisville) to the Final Four. The other coach is his former in-state rival, John Calipari (UMass Amherst, Memphis, and Kentucky), though both final four appearances at UMass and Memphis were later vacated (as was Louisville's 2013 title under Pitino).

As of 2022, Pitino's .730 winning percentage in 74 NCAA Tournament games ranked seventh among all coaches.

Pitino is considered by many to be one of the first coaches to promote fully taking advantage of the 3-point shot, first adopted by the NCAA in 1987. By exploiting the 3-point shot, his teams at Kentucky in the early 1990s were known as Pitino's Bombinos, as a significant portion of the offensive points came from the 3-point shot. Additionally, his teams are known for their signature use of the full-court press and 2–3 zone defensive schemes, as well as their general aggressive defensive style.

== Coaching tree ==
Many of Pitino's players and assistant coaches have gone on to become successful collegiate coaches. In total, 21 former Pitino players and coaches have become Division I head coaches.

Players under Pitino who became NBA or NCAA head coaches:

- Billy Donovan – Marshall (1994–1996), Florida (1996–2015), Oklahoma City Thunder (2015–2020), Chicago Bulls (2020–2026)
- Travis Ford – Campbellsville (1997–2000), Eastern Kentucky (2000–2005), UMass (2005–2008), Oklahoma State (2008–2016), Saint Louis (2016–2024), Little Rock (2026–present)
- John Pelphrey – South Alabama (2002–2007), Arkansas (2007–2011), Tennessee Tech (2019–2026)
- Mark Pope – Utah Valley (2015–2019), BYU (2019–2024), Kentucky (2024–present)

Assistants under Pitino who became NBA or NCAA head coaches:

- Gordon Chiesa – Providence (1987–1988)
- Jim O'Brien – Dayton (1989–1994), Boston Celtics (2001–2004), Philadelphia 76ers (2004–2005), Indiana Pacers (2007–2011)
- Stu Jackson – New York Knicks (1989–1990), Wisconsin (1992–1994), Vancouver Grizzlies (1997, interim)
- Ralph Willard – Western Kentucky (1990–1994), Pittsburgh (1994–1999), Holy Cross (1999–2009)
- Tubby Smith – Tulsa (1991–1995), Georgia (1995–1997), Kentucky (1997–2007), Minnesota (2007–2013), Texas Tech (2013–2016), Memphis (2016–2018), High Point (2018–2022)
- Herb Sendek – Miami (OH) (1993–1996), NC State (1996–2006), Arizona State (2006–2015), Santa Clara (2016–present)
- Jeff Van Gundy – New York Knicks (1996–2001), Houston Rockets (2003–2007)
- Mick Cronin – Murray State (2003–2006), Cincinnati (2006–2019), UCLA (2019–present)
- Scott Davenport – Bellarmine (2005–2025)
- Reggie Theus – New Mexico State (2005–2007), Sacramento Kings (2007–2008), Cal State Northridge (2013–2018), Bethune–Cookman (2021–present)
- Marvin Menzies - New Mexico State (2007–2016), UNLV (2016–2019), UMKC (2022–2026)
- Kevin Willard – Iona (2007–2010), Seton Hall (2010–2022), Maryland (2022–2025), Villanova (2025–present)
- Frank Vogel – Indiana Pacers (2011–2016), Orlando Magic (2016–2018), Los Angeles Lakers (2019–2022), Phoenix Suns (2023–2024)
- Richard Pitino – FIU (2012–2013), Minnesota (2013–2021), New Mexico (2021–2025), Xavier (2025–present)

== Head coaching record ==
=== College ===
Record table
Season	Team	Overall	Conference	Standing	Postseason
Hawaii Rainbow Warriors (NCAA Division I independent) (1975–1976)
1975–76	Hawaii	2–4			
Hawaii:		2–4 (.333)			
Boston University Terriers (NCAA Division I independent) (1978–1979)
1978–79	Boston University	17–9			
Boston University Terriers (Eastern College Athletic Conference-North) (1979–1983)
1979–80	Boston University	21–9	19–7	T–1st	NIT first round
1980–81	Boston University	13–14	13–13	T–4th	
1981–82	Boston University	19–9	6–2	4th	
1982–83	Boston University	21–10	8–2	T–1st	NCAA Division I Preliminary Round
Boston University:		91–51 (.641)	46–24 (.657)		
Providence Friars (Big East Conference) (1985–1987)
1985–86	Providence	17–14	7–9	5th	NIT quarterfinal
1986–87	Providence	25–9	10–6	4th	NCAA Division I Final Four
Providence:		42–23 (.646)	17–15 (.531)		
Kentucky Wildcats (Southeastern Conference) (1989–1997)
* 1989–90	Kentucky	14–14	10–8	T–4th*	Ineligible*
* 1990–91	Kentucky	22–6	14–4	1st**	Ineligible*
1991–92	Kentucky	29–7	12–4	1st (East)	NCAA Division I Elite Eight
1992–93	Kentucky	30–4	13–3	2nd (East)	NCAA Division I Final Four
1993–94	Kentucky	27–7	12–4	2nd (East)	NCAA Division I Round of 32
1994–95	Kentucky	28–5	14–2	1st (East)	NCAA Division I Elite Eight
1995–96	Kentucky	34–2	16–0	1st (East)	NCAA Division I Champion
1996–97	Kentucky	35–5	13–3	2nd (East)	NCAA Division I Runner-up
Kentucky:		219–50 (.814)	104–28 (.788)		
Louisville Cardinals (Conference USA) (2001–2005)
2001–02	Louisville	19–13	8–8	T–8th	NIT second round
2002–03	Louisville	25–7	11–5	3rd	NCAA Division I Round of 32
2003–04	Louisville	20–10***	9–7***	T–6th	NCAA Division I Round of 64
2004–05	Louisville	33–5	14–2	1st	NCAA Division I Final Four
Louisville Cardinals (Big East Conference) (2005–2013)
2005–06	Louisville	21–13	6–10	T–11th	NIT semifinal
2006–07	Louisville	24–10	12–4	T–2nd	NCAA Division I Round of 32
2007–08	Louisville	27–9	14–4	T–2nd	NCAA Division I Elite Eight
2008–09	Louisville	31–6	16–2	1st	NCAA Division I Elite Eight
2009–10	Louisville	20–13	11–7	T–5th	NCAA Division I Round of 64
2010–11	Louisville	25–10	12–6	T–3rd	NCAA Division I Round of 64
2011–12	Louisville	30–10****	10–8****	7th	NCAA Division I Final Four****
2012–13	Louisville	35–5****	14–4****	T–1st	NCAA Division I Champion****
Louisville Cardinals (American Athletic Conference) (2013–2014)
2013–14	Louisville	31–6****	15–3****	T–1st	NCAA Division I Sweet 16****
Louisville Cardinals (Atlantic Coast Conference) (2014–2017)
2014–15	Louisville	27–9****	12–6****	4th	NCAA Division I Elite Eight****
2015–16	Louisville	23–8	12–6	4th	Ineligible*****
2016–17	Louisville	25–9	12–6	T–2nd	NCAA Division I Round of 32
Louisville:		293–140 (.677)	137–88 (.609)		
Iona Gaels (Metro Atlantic Athletic Conference) (2020–2023)
2020–21	Iona	12–6	6–3	9th	NCAA Division I Round of 64
2021–22	Iona	25–8	17–3	1st	NIT first round
2022–23	Iona	27–8	17–3	1st	NCAA Division I Round of 64
Iona:		64–22 (.744)	40–9 (.816)		
St. John's Red Storm (Big East Conference) (2023–present)
2023–24	St. John's	20–13	11–9	5th	
2024–25	St. John's	31–5	18–2	1st	NCAA Division I Round of 32
2025–26	St. John's	30–7	18–2	1st	NCAA Division I Sweet 16
2026–27	St. John's	5–0	0–0		
St. John's:		86–25 (.775)	47–13 (.783)		
Total:		797–315 (.717)			
National champion Postseason invitational champion Conference regular season champion Conference regular season and conference tournament champion Division regular season champion Division regular season and conference tournament champion Conference tournament champion

* ^^{a} ^{b} ^{c} ^{d} ^{e} Kentucky was ineligible for both the NCAA and SEC Tournaments in 1990 and 1991 due to sanctions from the Eddie Sutton era.

** ^^{a} Kentucky finished first in the SEC standings. However, due to their probation, they were ineligible for the regular-season title; it was awarded to second-place LSU instead.

*** ^^{a} ^{b} Pitino did not coach in one win (January 28, 2004, vs. Houston) due to medical leave, but is credited with the victory.

**** ^^{a} ^{b} ^{c} ^{d} ^{e} ^{f} ^{g} ^{h} ^{i} ^{j} ^{k} ^{l} Louisville has vacated all of its victories and three losses from the 2011–12, 2012–13, 2013–14, 2014–15 seasons. These 123 wins and three losses are not included in Pitino's all-time record.

***** ^^{a}Louisville self-imposed ineligibility for the 2015–16 postseason due to an ongoing NCAA investigation.

=== NBA ===
Legend
Regular season	G	Games coached	W	Games won	L	Games lost	W–L %	Win–loss %
Playoffs	PG	Playoff games	PW	Playoff wins	PL	Playoff losses	PW–L %	Playoff win–loss %

Team	Year	G	W	L	W–L%	Finish	PG	PW	PL	PW–L%	Result
New York	1987–88	82	38	44	.463	2nd in Atlantic	4	1	3	.250	Lost in first round
New York	1988–89	82	52	30	.634	1st in Atlantic	9	5	4	.556	Lost in Conference semifinals
Boston	1997–98	82	36	46	.439	6th in Atlantic	—	—	—	—	Missed playoffs
Boston	1998–99	50	19	31	.380	5th in Atlantic	—	—	—	—	Missed playoffs
Boston	1999–2000	82	35	47	.427	5th in Atlantic	—	—	—	—	Missed playoffs
Boston	2000–01	34	12	22	.353	(resigned)	—	—	—	—	—
Career		412	192	220	.466		13	6	7	.462	

=== EuroLeague ===
Team	Year	G	W	L	W–L%	Result
Panathinaikos	2018–19	19	10	9	.526	Lost in Quarterfinals
Panathinaikos	2019–20	18	8	10	.444	Season suspended due to the COVID-19 pandemic
Career		37	18	19	.486	

== See also ==
- List of college men's basketball coaches with 600 wins
- List of NCAA Division I Men's Final Four appearances by coach
