= Kennedale High School =

Location
- 901 Wildcat Way; Kennedale, Texas 76060; United States; 32.65354°N 97.198663°W

Information
- Motto: Where Everybody is Cable
- Established: 1998
- Status: Currently operational
- School district: Kennedale Independent School District
- CEEB code: 443787
- Principal: Michael Cagle
- Teaching staff: 66.62 (FTE)
- Grades: 9-12
- Enrollment: 1,005 (2023-2024)
- Student to teacher ratio: 15.09
- Colours: Kelly green and White
- Athletics: UIL 4A
- Athletics conference: UIL 4A
- Mascot: Wildcat
- Team name: Wildcats, Lady Kats
- Website: khs.kennedaleisd.net

Kennedale High School is a public high school in Kennedale, Texas. The only high school in the Kennedale Independent School District, it serves students in Kennedale and a small part of Arlington. It was rated in 2011 "Recognized" by the Texas Education Agency.

== Campus ==
The 1974 building at 930 Bowman Springs Road in Kennedale became the junior high school campus when the new high school building at 901 Wildcat is the Way opened for the 1998–99 school year.

== Extracurricular activities ==
Activities and student groups at Kennedale High School include Art Club, Anime Club, Business Professionals of America, Choir, Computer Science Society, Friends of Rachel, Key Club, Kindness in Students Spreads, National Honor Society, Spanish National Honor Society, Outdoor Education Society, Spanish Club, Student Council, Thespians, UIL Academics, UIL Speech & Debate, and Yearbook.

=== Athletics ===
As of 2014, Kennedale High School competes in the AAAA, or 4A, classification of the University Interscholastic League. The Wildcats, known as the Lady Kats in women's leagues, compete in baseball, basketball, cheerleading, cross country, drill team, football, golf, powerlifting, soccer, softball, tennis, track and field, swimming, and volleyball.

==== State championship titles ====
- Girls' soccer: 2015, 2016 (4A)
- Boys' track : 2014 (3A)
- Boys' baseball: 2011 (3A)
- Boys' basketball: 2008 (3A), 2025 (4A)
- Girls' track : 2004 (3A), 2021 (4A)
- Softball: 1998, 2000 (3A)

=== Band ===
The Kennedale High School Wildcat Band includes a marching band, a jazz band, a varsity wind ensemble, and two sub-varsity wind ensembles.

The KHS Wildcat Marching Band qualified for every UIL state-wide championship for 14 years between 2006 and 2020, qualifying for finals between 2014 and 2020.

The KHS Varsity Wind Ensemble has qualified as a state finalist in the ATSSB Outstanding Performance Series competition.

== Notable alumni ==
- Daniel Millican (1983), screenwriter
- Wes Bautovich (1997), NFL safety
- Cedric James (1997), NFL wide receiver
- Aundre Jackson (2014), professional basketball player
- Allie Thornton (2016), professional soccer player
- Baron Browning (2017), NFL linebacker
- Alexis Brown (2019), track & field athlete
- Aidan Birr (2022), college football kicker
