= Sandidge =

Sandidge is a surname. Notable people with the surname include:

- John M. Sandidge (1817–1890), American politician
- Tim Sandidge (born 1983), American football player
