= Pete Hunter =

American gridiron football player (born 1980)

No. 47, 20, 29
- Position: Cornerback

Personal information
- Born: May 25, 1980 (age 46); Atlantic City, New Jersey, U.S.
- Listed height: 6 ft 2 in (1.88 m)
- Listed weight: 208 lb (94 kg)

Career information
- High school: Atlantic City
- College: Virginia Union
- NFL draft: 2002: 5th round, 168th overall pick

Career history
- Dallas Cowboys (2002–2004); New York Jets (2005)*; Cleveland Browns (2005); Seattle Seahawks (2006); Dallas Desperados (2008); Toronto Argonauts (2008)
- * Offseason or practice squad member only

Awards and highlights
- NCAA Division II All-American (2001); SBN Black College All-American (2001); 2× All-CIAA (1999, 2001); Second-team All-CIAA (2000)

Career NFL statistics
- Games played: 34
- Tackles: 69
- Passes defended: 11
- Interceptions: 3
- Fumble recoveries: 2
- Stats at Pro Football Reference
- Stats at ArenaFan.com

Ralph Everette "Pete" Hunter (born May 25, 1980) is an American former professional football cornerback in the National Football League (NFL) for the Dallas Cowboys, Cleveland Browns and Seattle Seahawks. He played college football for the Virginia Union Panthers.

== Early life and college ==
Hunter graduated from Atlantic City High School with honors. He attended NCAA Division II Virginia Union University. As a freshman, he was converted from a wide receiver into a cornerback and appeared in only 3 games.

The next year, he was moved to free safety, registering 40 tackles, 2 sacks, 10 passes defensed, 6 interceptions (led team), 2 fumble recoveries and 3 blocked kicks.

As a junior, he recorded 52 tackles (third on the team), 9 tackles for loss, 3 interceptions (second on the team), 3 recovered fumbles and 13 passes defensed (led the team). In his last year he was switched to strong safety, helping lead his team to a CIAA football championship, also led the conference with 11 interceptions (1 per game) and 6 blocked kicks, while also making 50 tackles and 13 passes defensed (led team).

He finished his college football career with 10 blocked kicks and graduated with a degree in Criminal Justice. He also worked as a volunteer substitute teacher with grades ranging from K-8.

== Professional career ==
Pre-draft measurables
Height	Weight
6 ft 2 1/8 in (1.88 m)	193 lb (88 kg)
Values from Pro Day

=== Dallas Cowboys ===
Hunter was selected by the Dallas Cowboys in the fifth round of the 2002 NFL draft. He was declared inactive for the first 2 games of the season. He also missed 2 games with an ankle injury. He finished the year after playing in 11 games (2 starts), registering 27 tackles (21 solo) and one interception.

The next year, he suffered a fractured left forearm and was forced to miss the first three preseason games. He recovered in time to play in all 16 regular season games and finished with 19 tackles (18 solo), 4 passes defensed and one interception. He played the nickel back role and was one of the leaders in special teams tackles (11).

Hunter entered his third season as the team's starting right corner before suffering an ACL tear in his right knee in the third game of the season and being placed on the injured reserve list, after registering 9 tackles, one interception, one sack and one pass defensed.

In 2005, it was implied that he might be moved to safety after free agent Anthony Henry was signed to take over the right cornerback job. Hunter and his agent started to ask for a trade and on July 14 he was sent to the New York Jets for a conditional sixth round draft pick in the 2007 NFL draft (#200-Melila Purcell), after he stated to the Dallas media that he did not want to be moved to safety and he only wanted to play the cornerback position. In his time with the Cowboys, he racked up 43 tackles and three interceptions in 30 games.

=== New York Jets ===
In 2005, the New York Jets acquired Hunter to replace the retired Donnie Abraham at the left cornerback position. Missing some practices early in training camp due to knee swelling, he was waived on August 10, after being on the team for less than three weeks.

=== Cleveland Browns ===
On December 6, 2005, the Cleveland Browns signed him as a free agent. He saw action as a special teams player in the last four games but accumulated no statistics. His contract was terminated prior to the start of the regular season on September 2, 2006.

=== Seattle Seahawks ===
On January 2, 2007, he was signed as a free agent to the Seattle Seahawks on the recommendation of head coach Mike Holmgren, to provide depth after they lost three of their four active cornerbacks to injury prior to the playoffs.

On January 6, he played his first game in Seattle, a Wild Card Playoff game against his former team the Dallas Cowboys. Hunter had three tackles, defended one pass, and recovered a Jason Witten fumble. He was also the player who knocked down the Cowboys last second Hail Mary pass to seal the victory. In a postgame interview on the Seahawks team site, he was quoted as saying: "I don't know when I'm going to wake up – I'm not going to go to sleep tonight". This was also the game where Tony Romo serving as the holder for the kicker, fumbled the snap of a potential game-winning field goal with 1:19 to play.

On January 14, he played against the Bears in Chicago in a divisional playoff game. When Rex Grossman underthrew a receiver, Hunter intercepted a pass at a pivotal point in the fourth quarter, preventing the Bears from scoring a touchdown. Unfortunately, the Seahawks threw an interception on the very next play and would lose the game with a field goal in overtime. He was waived on September 1, 2007.

=== All American Football League ===
On January 26, 2008, Hunter was selected in the fourth round of the inaugural 2008 AAFL draft by Team Florida. However, the All American Football League announced that it was postponing its inaugural season until 2009 due to financial constraints.

=== Dallas Desperados ===
On March 20, 2008, he signed with the Dallas Desperados of the Arena Football League, who were owned by Jerry Jones, who also owned the Dallas Cowboys. He played in six games with five starts (inactive in five games), registering 23.5 tackles (fifth-most on the team), one interception and three passes defensed. He was placed on the reserve/left squad on June 10, for undisclosed reasons.

=== Toronto Argonauts ===
On August 25, 2008, Hunter was signed to the Toronto Argonauts practice roster. He was released at the end of the training camp on June 25.

== Personal life ==
After being cut by the Cleveland Browns, he moved back to Dallas and began his career as a loan officer with the Petra Lending Group. He also begun training to be a United States border agent.
