= Alexis Brown =

American athlete (born 2001)

Personal information
- Born: April 26, 2001 (age 25)

Sport
- Sport: Athletics
- Events: Long jump, Sprinting

Achievements and titles
- Personal bests: 100m: 11.08 (Lawrence, 2025); Long jump: 7.07m (Gainesville, 2026)

Alexis "Lex" Brown (born 26 April 2001) is an American long jumper and sprinter. She won the 2025 NCAA Indoor Championship long jump title.

== Early and personal life ==
She is from Kennedale, Texas, and attended Kennedale High School. Her mother was born and raised in Haiti. In 2018, she finished third at the New Balance Nationals Indoor championships with a time of 7.38 seconds for the 60 metres. She represented Haiti at the 2018 CARIFTA Games. She had to overcome surgery to remove an extra bone in her foot which hampered her collegiate athletics career. In 2024, she graduated with a Health, Kinesiology and Leisure Studies degree and was accepted to the MBA program at Baylor University, having transferred from the University of Florida in 2022.

== Career ==
In 2024, she was named the Outdoor Big 12 Performer of the Year, and finished fifth in the long jump and sixth as part of the Baylor University 4x100 metres relay team at the 2024 NCAA Outdoor Championships. She finished fifth in the 2024 United States Olympic trials in Eugene, Oregon in June 2024.

Representing Baylor University, she won the 2025 NCAA Championship long jump indoor title on 14 March 2025 in Virginia Beach, with a personal best jump of 6.90 metres. She became the first Baylor athlete to win a national championship in the long jump. In May 2025, she jumped a personal best and wind-legal mark of 7.03m to win the long jump title at the Big 12 Conference in Lawrence, Kansas. It was the third-farthest long jump made in the NCAA, behind only jumps by Tara Davis-Woodhall and Ackelia Smith. She placed third in the long jump at the 2025 NCAA Outdoor Championships on 12 June.

She jumped 6.71 metres to place fifth at the 2025 Prefontaine Classic on 5 July. She then jumped 6.79 metres to place sixth overall in the long jump at the 2025 USA Outdoor Track and Field Championships in July.

In April 2026 at the Tom Jones Invitational in Gainesville, Florida she jumped a personal best 7.07 metres on her professional debut, moving to seventh on the American all-time list. In May, she jumped 6.75 metres to place third at the 2026 Shanghai Diamond League.
