= Aidan Birr =

American football player

No. 33 – Georgia Tech Yellow Jackets
- Position: Placekicker
- Class: Redshirt Senior

Personal information
- Listed height: 6 ft 1 in (1.85 m)
- Listed weight: 205 lb (93 kg)

Career information
- High school: Kennedale (Kennedale, Texas)
- College: Georgia Tech (2022–present)

Awards and highlights
- First-team All-ACC (2025)
- Stats at ESPN

Aidan Birr is an American football kicker for the Georgia Tech Yellow Jackets.

== Early life ==
Birr attended Kennedale High School in Kennedale, Texas. He committed to play college football for the Georgia Tech Yellow Jackets.

== College career ==
Birr missed his freshman season in 2022 while recovering from a torn ACL. In 2023, he converted 17 of 19 field goal attempts and went 37 for 38 on extra points. In week zero of the 2024 season, Birr hit the game-winning 44-yard field goal to upset Florida State. On the season, he hit 15 of 22 field goals and converted all 45 extra points. In week 3 of the 2025 season, he made the game-winning 55-yard field goal in an upset over Clemson. Birr went 25 for 29 on field goal attempts that season, while also going 45 for 45 on extra points, earning first-team all-ACC honors. He also finished as a finalist for the Lou Groza Award.
