= Darnerien McCants =

American football player (born 1978)

No. 85
- Position: Wide receiver

Personal information
- Born: August 1, 1978 (age 48); Baltimore, Maryland, U.S.
- Listed height: 6 ft 3 in (1.91 m)
- Listed weight: 215 lb (98 kg)

Career information
- High school: Arundel (Gambrills, Maryland)
- College: Delaware State
- NFL draft: 2001: 5th round, 154th overall pick

Career history
- Washington Redskins (2001–2004); Philadelphia Eagles (2005); Hamilton Tiger-Cats (2007); Baltimore Ravens (2008)*; Montreal Alouettes (2009)*
- * Offseason or practice squad member only

Career NFL statistics
- Receptions: 58
- Receiving yards: 774
- Receiving touchdowns: 8
- Stats at Pro Football Reference

Darnerien Richard McCants (born August 1, 1978) is an American former professional football player who was a wide receiver in the National Football League (NFL) and Canadian Football League (CFL). He was selected by the Washington Redskins in the fifth round of the 2001 NFL draft. He played college football for the Delaware State Hornets.

McCants played for the Philadelphia Eagles, Hamilton Tiger-Cats, Baltimore Ravens and Montreal Alouettes.

== Early life ==
As a senior at Arundel High School in Gambrills, Maryland, McCants was an All-State, All-County and All-Metro selection in one season of organized high school football. He led his teams to county and regional championships.

McCants was also a state champion in the high jump.

McCants previously played one year of JV football at Oakland Mills High School in Columbia, Maryland before transferring to Arundel.

He spent his freshman year at Wilde Lake High School in Columbia, Maryland.

== College career ==
At Delaware State University, McCants played his best season as a senior, at tight end, tallying career-highs of 36 catches, 692 receiving yards and 18 touchdowns. His touchdown total set Delaware State and MEAC records, and was No. 1 in NCAA Division I-AA.

== Professional career ==
=== Washington Redskins ===
McCants was selected by the Washington Redskins in the fifth round of the 2001 NFL draft. After showing promise as an end zone threat in 2003, He fell out of favor with the new coaching staff and spent much of 2004 on the inactive list. He was released after the 2004 season.

=== Philadelphia Eagles ===
Before the 2005 season McCants signed with the Philadelphia Eagles. When active in 2005, he primarily played on special teams. He was released prior to the 2006 season.

=== Hamilton Tiger-Cats ===
On July 11, 2007, McCants was signed by the Hamilton Tiger-Cats with whom he played three games.

=== Team Tennessee ===
On January 26, 2008, he was selected 38th overall by Team Tennessee in the 2008 AAFL draft.

=== Baltimore Ravens ===
On July 25, 2008, McCants signed with the Baltimore Ravens. He was later released on August 26.

=== Montreal Alouettes ===
On December 18, 2008, McCants signed with the Montreal Alouettes.

He was released by the Alouettes on March 17, 2009.

== NFL career statistics ==
Legend
**Bold**	Career high

Year	Team	Games		Receiving					
Year	Team	GP	GS	Tgt	Rec	Yds	Avg	Lng	TD
2002	WAS	9	**1**	41	21	256	12.2	**32**	2
2003	WAS	**15**	**1**	**55**	**27**	**360**	13.3	**32**	**6**
2004	WAS	5	**1**	9	5	71	14.2	27	0
2005	PHI	12	0	9	5	87	**17.4**	22	0
		41	3	114	58	774	13.3	32	8

== Music career ==
Outside of football, Darnerien is an R&B singer, signed by the record label MacVizion LLC. McCants says his music is inspired by artists such as R. Kelly and Michael Jackson.

== Coaching ==
McCants worked as a personal trainer upon retiring from football in 2009. McCants lives in Ashburn, Virginia and prior to 2019 he coached there at both Briar Woods High School and Rock Ridge High School for six years. In 2019 McCants became a jumping coach for the track team at Wilde Lake High School in Columbia, Maryland which he had attended as a freshman. In September 2021, he was listed as Wilde Lake's head coach for cross country and boys indoor track, as well as assistant coach for boys outdoor track.

McCants has expressed the intent to become an educator, having majored in education at Delaware State. In 2020, he started the nonprofit Finding Me Foundation which seeks to combat juvenile delinquency by introducing children to reading.

In 2017 and 2019, McCants played in the biennial Congressional Football Game for Charity, an event featuring members of Congress and former NFL players playing against Capitol Police officers to benefit the Capitol Police Memorial Fund, Our Military Kids and A Advantage 4 Kids.
