= Bob Samaras =

American basketball coach and author (1927–2018)

Bob Samaras (August 16, 1927 – February 21, 2018) was a basketball coach at Eastern High School in Detroit and later at the University of Windsor. He was also the author of the book Blitz Basketball in which he laid out the plan for playing basketball in a manner that would later be termed a Full-court press.

Samaras is Greek Orthodox and spent most of his adult life living in St. Clair Shores, Michigan.

Samaras also wrote the book Mom, I'll Stop Crying if You Stop Crying.

== Sources ==
- St. Theotokos website
- University of Windsor sports hall of fame website
- Open Library listing of books by Samaras
- Obituary
