= Baron Browning =

American football player (born 1999)

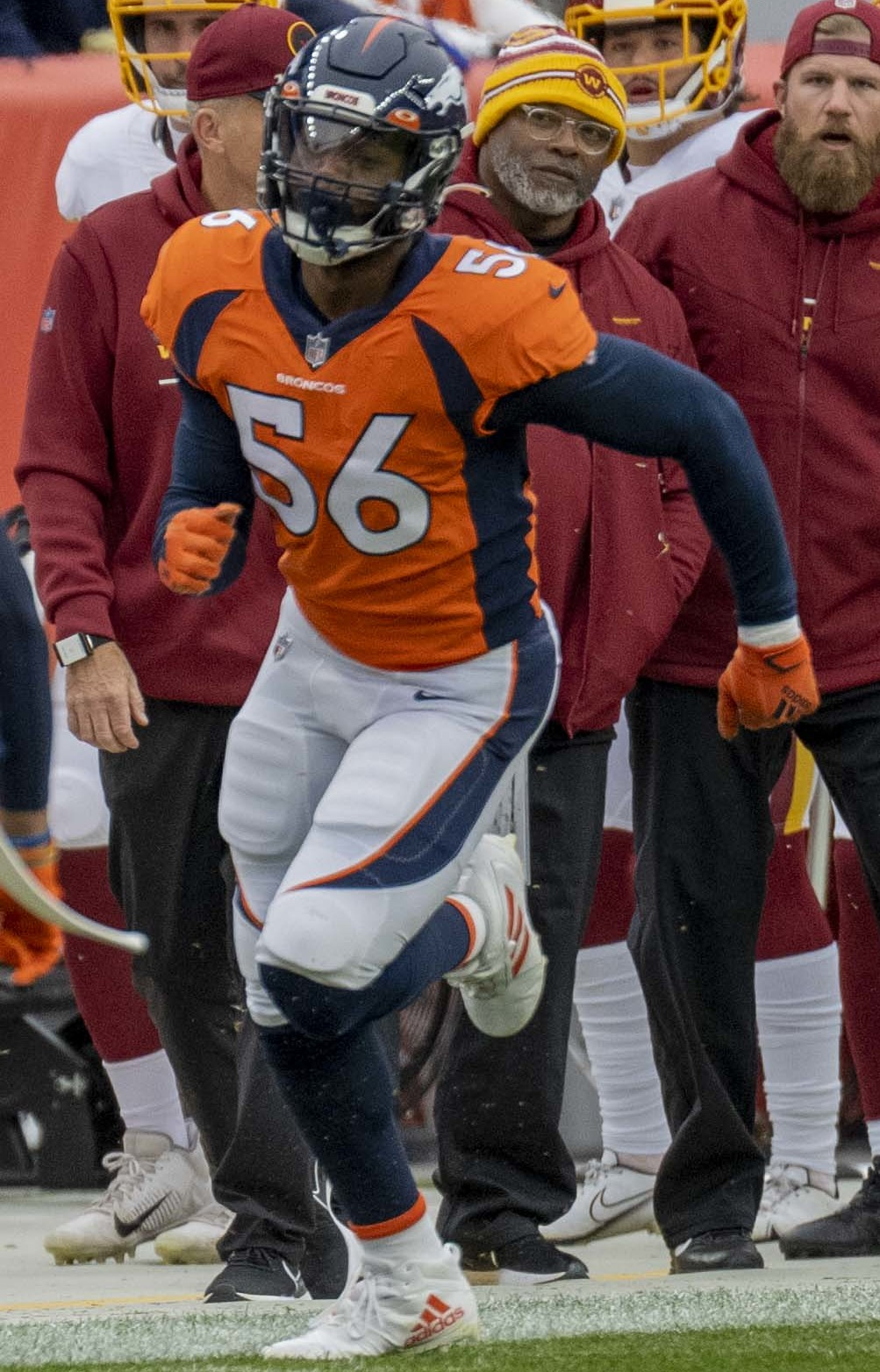
- Browning with the Denver Broncos in 2021

No. 5 – Arizona Cardinals
- Position: Outside linebacker
- Roster status: Active

Personal information
- Born: February 19, 1999 (age 27); Fort Worth, Texas, U.S.
- Listed height: 6 ft 3 in (1.91 m)
- Listed weight: 255 lb (116 kg)

Career information
- High school: Kennedale (Kennedale, Texas)
- College: Ohio State (2017–2020)
- NFL draft: 2021: 3rd round, 105th overall pick

Career history
- Denver Broncos (2021–2024); Arizona Cardinals (2024–present)

Awards and highlights
- Third-team All-Big Ten (2020)

Career NFL statistics as of Week 5, 2026
- Total tackles: 171
- Sacks: 14.5
- Pass deflections: 7
- Interceptions: 2
- Forced fumbles: 4
- Fumble recoveries: 2
- Stats at Pro Football Reference

Baron Browning (born February 19, 1999) is an American professional football outside linebacker for the Arizona Cardinals of the National Football League (NFL). He played college football for the Ohio State Buckeyes and was selected by the Denver Broncos in the third round of the 2021 NFL draft.

== Early life ==
Browning attended Kennedale High School in Kennedale, Texas. A five star recruit, he played in the 2017 U.S. Army All American Bowl and was a finalist for the Butkus Award. He committed to Ohio State University to play college football.

== College career ==
As a true freshman at Ohio State in 2017, Browning played in 12 games and had 14 tackles. He started three of 12 games his sophomore year in 2018, recording 24 tackles and one sack. He again played in 12 games his junior year in 2019, finishing with 43 tackles and five sacks. Browning returned to Ohio State for his senior year in 2020 and was moved from middle linebacker to outside linebacker.

== Professional career ==
Pre-draft measurables
Height	Weight	Arm length	Hand span	Wingspan	40-yard dash	10-yard split	20-yard split	20-yard shuttle	Three-cone drill	Vertical jump	Broad jump	Bench press
6 ft 2 3/4 in (1.90 m)	245 lb (111 kg)	33 1/2 in (0.85 m)	9 7/8 in (0.25 m)	6 ft 7 in (2.01 m)	4.55 s	1.56 s	2.69 s	4.22 s	6.78 s	40.0 in (1.02 m)	10 ft 10 in (3.30 m)	23 reps
All values from Pro Day

=== Denver Broncos ===
Browning was drafted by the Denver Broncos in the third round, 105th overall, of the 2021 NFL draft. He signed his four-year rookie contract with Denver on July 22, 2021.

Browning started his tenure with the Broncos as an inside linebacker but was eventually moved to the outside linebacker group.

Browning was placed on the reserve/PUP list to start the 2023 season. He was activated on October 21, 2023.

On September 21, 2024, Browning was placed on injured reserve after suffering a foot injury in Week 2 against the Pittsburgh Steelers. He was activated on October 17.

=== Arizona Cardinals ===
On November 4, 2024, the Broncos traded Browning to the Arizona Cardinals for a 2025 sixth-round pick.

On March 9, 2025, Browning signed a two-year, $15 million extension with the Cardinals, with a potential additional $4 million in incentives.

== NFL career statistics ==
Legend
**Bold**	Career high

=== Regular season ===
Year	Team	Games		Tackles					Interceptions						Fumbles				
Year	Team	GP	GS	Cmb	Solo	Ast	Sck	TFL	Int	Yds	Avg	Lng	TD	PD	FF	Fum	FR	Yds	TD
2021	DEN	14	9	**58**	**32**	**26**	0.0	2	0	0	0.0	0	0	**2**	0	0	0	0	0
2022	DEN	14	8	24	14	10	**5.0**	**8**	**1**	-6	-6.0	-6	0	**2**	0	**1**	**1**	0	0
2023	DEN	10	9	25	19	6	4.5	4	0	0	0.0	0	0	**2**	**2**	0	0	0	0
2024	DEN	5	2	7	1	6	0.0	1	0	0	0.0	0	0	0	0	0	0	0	0
2024	ARI	8	1	14	11	3	2.0	4	0	0	0.0	0	0	0	0	0	0	0	0
2025	ARI	15	7	34	14	20	2.0	4	**1**	**4**	**4.0**	**4**	0	1	0	0	**1**	0	0
2026	ARI	5	3	9	6	3	1.0	2	0	0	0.0	0	0	0	2	0	0	0	0
Career		71	39	171	97	74	14.5	25	2	-2	-1.0	4	0	7	4	1	2	0	0
