= Willie Amos =

American gridiron football player (born 1982)

No. 39, 14
- Position: Defensive back

Personal information
- Born: July 28, 1982 (age 44); Sweetwater, Texas, U.S.
- Listed height: 6 ft 0 in (1.83 m)
- Listed weight: 190 lb (86 kg)

Career information
- College: Nebraska (2000–2004)
- NFL draft: 2005: undrafted

Career history
- Chicago Bears (2005)*; → Hamburg Sea Devils (2006); Team Texas (2008)*; Winnipeg Blue Bombers (2008); Edmonton Eskimos (2009)
- * Offseason or practice squad member only

Willie Amos (born July 28, 1982) is an American former professional football defensive back. He played college football at Nebraska.

== Early life ==
Amos was born in Sweetwater, Texas and attended Sweetwater High School. He is a champion jump rope skipper. In 1999, he jumped with Team USA at the FISAC World Jump Rope Championships and won in the all-male senior division.

== College career ==
Amos played safety his first year at the University of Nebraska–Lincoln. He tore his ACL during training, and sat out the 2002 season as a result. He came back in the 2003 season to play left cornerback his junior year. Amos was switched to wide receiver his senior season in 2004 and recorded 2 touchdowns in his debut performance.

== Professional career ==
Amos was signed to the practice squad of the Chicago Bears of the National Football League on December 14, 2005. He signed a futures contract with the Bears on January 10, 2006. He was allocated to NFL Europe in 2006 to play for the Hamburg Sea Devils. He appeared in all 10 games, starting three, for the Sea Devils during the 2006 NFL Europe season, recording 24 tackles on defense, six special teams tackles, one interception, and six pass breakups. Amos was released by the Bears on August 15, 2006 after being injured.

On January 26, 2008, Amos was drafted by Team Texas of the AAFL in the 10th round.

He dressed in 11 games for the Winnipeg Blue Bombers of the Canadian Football League in 2008, totaling 52 defensive tackles, seven pass breakups, one interception, one forced fumble, and one fumble recovery.

Coleman was traded to the Edmonton Eskimos on June 14, 2009, for offensive linemen Thaddeus Coleman. He was injured several times during his tenure with the Eskimos, He was released on June 24, 2010.

== Personal life ==
Amos is a Christian athlete and a member of Epsilon Rho chapter of the Iota Phi Theta fraternity. After his playing career, he gave jump rope demonstrations and started a fitness company. Amos has also spent time as the jump rope coach for the Jumpin' Jammers, located in Euless, Texas.
