= Albert Means =

American football player (born 1982)

Profile
- Position: Defensive tackle

Personal information
- Born: July 20, 1982 (age 44); Memphis, Tennessee
- Listed height: 6 ft 4 in (1.93 m)
- Listed weight: 336 lb (152 kg)

Career information
- High school: Trezevant (Memphis, Tennessee)
- College: Memphis
- NFL draft: 2005: undrafted

Career history
- Houston Texans (2005)*
- * Offseason or practice squad member only

Awards and highlights
- USA Today High School All-American (1999); Second Team All-Conference USA (2004)

Albert Means (born July 20, 1982) is an American former football defensive lineman. A high school football star, Means became well known because of the rule breaking that surrounded his recruitment by college programs.

Means was a standout defensive tackle at Trezevant High School in Memphis, Tennessee. As a high school senior in 1999, he was Tennessee's Mr. Football, a high school All American and was one of the most highly regarded football players in the nation. Many analysts considered Means to be the best high school defensive lineman in the United States. Several schools competed to land him as a recruit, and he ultimately signed with the University of Alabama. He appeared in seven games during the 2000 season, starting four of them.

In January 2001, former Trezevant assistant coach Milton Kirk asserted that head coach Lynn Lang had let colleges know that for $200,000 Lang would arrange for Means to play for Alabama. Kirk said that in the fall of 1999, he'd helped Lang broker a deal with several Alabama boosters in the Memphis area. During the fall, he'd gotten $30,000 from the boosters. The other $170,000 was paid when Means signed with the Crimson Tide in December.

Other claims specific to the recruitment of Means included Kirk's assertion that Lang demanded and received $6,000 in cash from a University of Kentucky booster in the presence of Kentucky assistant coach Claude Bassett for arranging Means' visit to that school, and that Lang in similar fashion received $4,000 for each visit he arranged to the University of Georgia and the University of Alabama. These allegations and other evidence provided by Tennessee Volunteers coach Phillip Fulmer led the National Collegiate Athletic Association (NCAA) and Federal Bureau of Investigation (FBI) to investigate the recruitment of high school football players in Memphis.

The FBI investigation led to the criminal conviction on February 2, 2005, of Alabama booster Logan Young for paying $150,000 in cash to Lang through 1999 and 2000 in order to have Means play football at Alabama. Lang and Kirk were also tried and convicted for their roles in Means' recruitment.

As a result of this and other violations, Alabama was given a two-year bowl ban and five years' probation, and narrowly escaped being handed the "death penalty." The Tide were also docked 21 scholarships. Kentucky was given a one-year bowl ban. The University of Georgia, the University of Arkansas and the University of Memphis also pursued Means but were not sanctioned for any misconduct regarding their recruitment of Means. At Young's trial Lang testified that Georgia head coach Jim Donnan gave Lang $700 "out of his own pocket", that University of Memphis head coach Rip Scherer promised free law school tuition for Lang's wife at Memphis and that an Arkansas coach offered him $150,000 or a position on the Razorbacks' coaching staff. At Young's trial, Donnan and Scherer denied Lang's allegations. Brad Lawing, an assistant coach for Michigan State University who recruited Means, said Lang demanded $200,000 to arrange for Means to play football there, and that Lang stated he would have to repay $50,000 to another school that had already paid for Means. Arkansas head coach Houston Nutt stated that one of his assistant coaches was told by Lang that $200,000 was required to secure Means' enrollment.

Also during Lang's trial, Means testified that he never took a required standardized test for college admission. Means testified that Lang had another student take the test in his place.

At Young's trial, federal prosecutors offered evidence that Lang had tried to "sell" Means to eight schools: Alabama, Arkansas, Georgia, Kentucky, Memphis, Michigan State University, the University of Mississippi and the University of Tennessee.

After the allegations came to light, Alabama released Means from his national letter of intent, and he transferred to Memphis to finish his college career. He was overweight and academically ineligible in 2002 but in 2004 married, worked on his conditioning and improved his play. He was second team All-Conference USA as a senior but was not drafted by any NFL team. The Houston Texans signed him as an undrafted free agent, but he was unable to make the roster.

Means was selected by Team Arkansas in the third round of the inaugural All American Football League draft on January 26, 2008.
