= Tre Smith (running back) =

American gridiron football player (born 1984)

Profile
- Position: Running back

Personal information
- Born: April 4, 1984 (age 42); Elkins, West Virginia
- Listed height: 5 ft 9 in (1.75 m)
- Listed weight: 193 lb (88 kg)

Career information
- College: Auburn

Career history
- Team Alabama (2008); Hamilton Tiger-Cats (2008–2009)

Lyle C. "Tre" Smith III (born April 4, 1984) is an American former football running back.

== High school ==
A heavily lauded running back at Venice High School, Smith earned two All-Florida selections, All-American honors from multiple publications (Tom Lemming’s Prep Football Report, SuperPrep Magazine), and won the Florida Class 5A Player of the Year award his junior season after leading Venice High School to a Florida Class 5A state championship. Rushed for 1,776 yards on 180 carries his senior season with 20 touchdowns. Posted 1,886 yards and 34 touchdowns his junior year. His 4,850 career rushing yards broke the school record, in addition to the single-game rushing record (which he topped with 336 yards) and time in the 100m. He was also a National Honor Society member.

== College ==
Smith opted for Auburn University after University of Florida head coach Steve Spurrier left the NCAA to coach the NFL’s Washington Redskins and Ron Zook took over at Florida.

Smith saw limited action as a freshman in 2002, but despite this challenge, he managed 454 yards on 79 carries with 3 touchdowns and finishing third in rushing on the team. The most memorable game of 2002 was against the University of Alabama. He was moved into the punt return position as a junior, and though his 141 yards rushing were a marked decrease, Smith took considerable touches in goal line situations and ranked second on the team with 6 touchdowns. His junior season was enveloped by a shoulder injury that caused Smith to miss 10 games and redshirt the following year. Came into his senior season with Coaches’ Preseason All-SEC Third-Team nomination, playing in all 12 games, but only started 2 and managed 285 yards on 56 carries, bringing to close a career at Auburn University that left Smith ranked fourth in the school’s history with 72 punt returns and fifth with 621 punt return yards.

== Professional ==
Pre-draft measurables
Height	Weight	40-yard dash	10-yard split	20-yard split	20-yard shuttle	Three-cone drill	Vertical jump	Broad jump	Bench press
5 ft 9 1/8 in (1.76 m)	193 lb (88 kg)	4.50 s	1.54 s	2.62 s	3.96 s	6.72 s	37.0 in (0.94 m)	10 ft 0 in (3.05 m)	9 reps
All values from Pro Day

After going undrafted in the 2007 NFL draft, Smith had a try-out with the Cleveland Browns before signing a free agent contract with the defending Grey Cup champion B.C. Lions of the Canadian Football League. In 2008, Smith joined the All-American Football League as a protected player for Team Alabama.
