= Kennedale Independent School District =

School district in Texas

Location
- Kennedale, Texas United States of America

District information
- Type: Public
- Motto: Committed to Excellence
- Superintendent: Chad Gee
- Governing agency: Texas Education Agency
- NCES District ID: 4825500

Students and staff
- Students: 3,134
- Teachers: 204.8
- Staff: 394.4

Other information
- Website: http://www.kennedaleisd.net

Kennedale Independent School District is a public school district based in Kennedale, Texas (USA).

In addition to Kennedale, the district serves small portions of Arlington and Fort Worth.

In 2016-2017, the school district was rated "exemplary" by the Texas Education Agency.

== Motto ==
Kennedale ISD's motto is "Committed to Excellence"

== Schools ==
Kennedale ISD has five schools - four in Kennedale and one (R.F. Patterson Elementary) in Arlington.

- Kennedale High School (Grades 9-12)
- Kennedale Junior High (Grades 7-8)
- James A. Arthur Intermediate (Grades 5-6)
- James F. Delaney Elementary (Grades PK-4)
- R.F. Patterson Elementary (Grades K-4)

== Students ==
=== Academics ===
STAAR - Percent at Level II Satisfactory Standard or Above (Sum of All Grades Tested)
Subject	Kennedale ISD	Region 11	State of Texas
Reading	79%	76%	73%
Mathematics	80%	78%	76%
Writing	75%	72%	69%
Science	83%	81%	79%
Soc. Studies	83%	80%	77%
All Tests	80%	77%	75%

Students in Kennedale typically perform close to the local region and state-wide averages on standardized tests. In the 2015-2016 State of Texas Assessments of Academic Readiness (STAAR) results, 80% of students in Kennedale ISD met Level II Satisfactory standards, compared with 77% in Region 11 and 75% in the state of Texas. The average SAT score of the class of 2015 was 1413, and the average ACT score was 22.1.

=== Demographics ===
In the 2015-2016 school year, the school district had a total of 3,134 students, ranging from pre-kindergarten through grade 12. The class of 2015 included 228 graduates; the annual drop-out rate across grades 9-12 was less than 1%.

As of the 2015-2016 school year, the ethnic distribution of the school district was 48.7% White, 22.0% Hispanic, 20.7% African American, 4.0% Asian, 0.5% American Indian, 0.4% Pacific Islander, and 3.8% from two or more races. Economically disadvantaged students made up 39.9% of the student body.
