= Gary Parrish =

American sports journalist

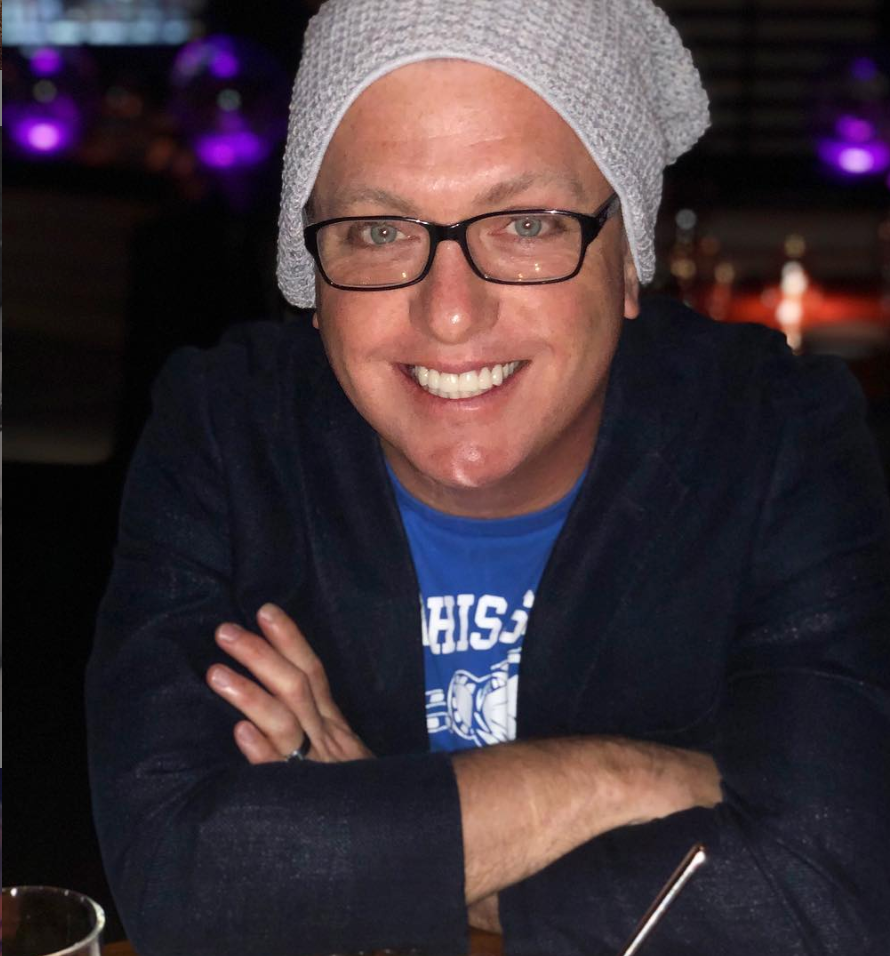
- Parish in January 2019
- Education: University of Memphis
- Occupation: Journalist

Gary Parrish is a sports columnist for CBSSports.com, a host, studio analyst and sideline reporter for the CBS Sports Network, the host of the CBS Sports Eye On College Basketball podcast, and the host of "The Gary Parrish Show" on Grind City Media in Memphis.

Parrish has been covering college basketball since 2002, been with CBS Sports since 2006 and Grind City Media since 2023.

He previously worked at The Commercial Appeal and 92.9 FM ESPN in Memphis. As a young reporter for The Commercial Appeal in 2001, Parrish broke the story of the college football recruiting scandal surrounding standout Alabama Crimson Tide defensive tackle Albert Means, which would be regarded as one of the biggest scandals in the sport's history.
