= Full-court press =

Defensive tactic in basketball

A full-court press is a basketball term for a defensive style in which the defense applies pressure to the offensive team the entire length of the court before and after the inbound pass. Pressure may be applied man-to-man, or via a zone press using a zone defense. Some presses attempt to deny the initial inbounds pass and trap ball handlers either in the backcourt or at midcourt.

Defenses not employing a full-court press generally allow the offensive team to get halfway down the court (a half-court press) or near the basket before applying strong defensive pressure.

== Gameplay ==
A full-court press takes a great deal of effort, but can be an effective tactic. Often when teams are behind late in a game, they will apply full-court pressure as a means of attempting to produce turnovers as well as tire opponents. Certain teams, such as those coached by Rick Pitino and Billy Donovan, are known for applying full-court pressure during most of the game (this was especially evident for Pitino's Kentucky Wildcats championship squad in the 1996 NCAA tournament). Presses are especially effective against teams with poor ballhandlers, shallow benches (since players become more fatigued when being attacked by a press), or slow, deliberate offenses (since taking the ball up the court can waste a substantial portion of the shot clock). Once a press is broken, however, the defensive team is vulnerable to a potential fast break or open three-point opportunity since defensive players may be caught behind the play.

Effective press breaks employ quick passing more often than dribbling to advance the ball up the floor. Short, quick passes are less prone to turnovers than either long passes or dribbling. Another effective way to break a man-to-man press is to pass to the center. Most presses keep a "last man back" (usually the center) whose job is to disrupt a potential fast break resulting from the press; this may leave the offensive center unguarded and able to receive a pass near midcourt or near the basket for an easy score.

== History ==
In the 1950s, the full-court press style of play was invented by John McLendon, an American basketball coach who is recognized as the first African American basketball coach at a predominantly white university and the first African American head coach in any professional sport. McLendon is often not credited because he invented it within the African American college league. Due to segregation, African American teams could only compete against other African American teams. For years, his style of play went unnoticed by white society and later was called unrefined until white coaches adopted it. McLendon's contributions to the game of basketball also include an increase in tempo and the four corners offense.

Gene Johnson, head coach at Wichita University (now called Wichita State University) is credited with creating the full court press. UCLA Assistant Coach Jerry Norman is credited with convincing Head Coach John Wooden to utilize a full court press in 1964 to compensate for their undersized team which was led by All Americans Walt Hazzard and Gail Goodrich. The Bruins won their first national title that year and repeated as champions in 1965, again utilizing the full court press with great success to push the tempo of their games. While the full-court press was designed primarily to prevent teams with taller personnel from setting up their defenses, frequent turnovers leading to easy scoring opportunities for UCLA also resulted.

In the 1960s, Hobbs High School, New Mexico boys' basketball coach Ralph Tasker began using a man-to-man pressure defense from baseline to baseline, buzzer to buzzer. This defensive strategy resulted in numerous turnovers and scoring opportunities for his teams. The 1969–70 Hobbs Eagles team scored 100 points or higher in 14 consecutive games, a national record held for 40 years. Tasker's teams set the New Mexico scoring record for most points scored in a game with 170 points against Carlsbad High in 1970 and with 176 points against Roswell High in 1978, and scored above 150 points in three games in 1981.

Arkansas's coach Nolan Richardson observed and adopted Tasker's up-tempo pressure defense while coaching at the high-school level. He called his version of full-court pressure "40 minutes of Hell." VCU's former coach Shaka Smart calls his form of full-court pressure "Wreaking Havoc" or "Havoc Ball".

The Serbian coach Đorđe Andrijašević was the first one to use this technique in Europe. His zone press was an adapted and improved version of Gene Johnson's full-court press. He used it for the first time with French team JA Vichy in 1965. This defensive style was then reproduced by other French squads and quickly became popular in other European leagues.

== Other related defense ==
- Basketball playbook: Man defense plays
- Basketball playbook: Zone defense plays
