= Fast break =

Offensive strategy in basketball and handball

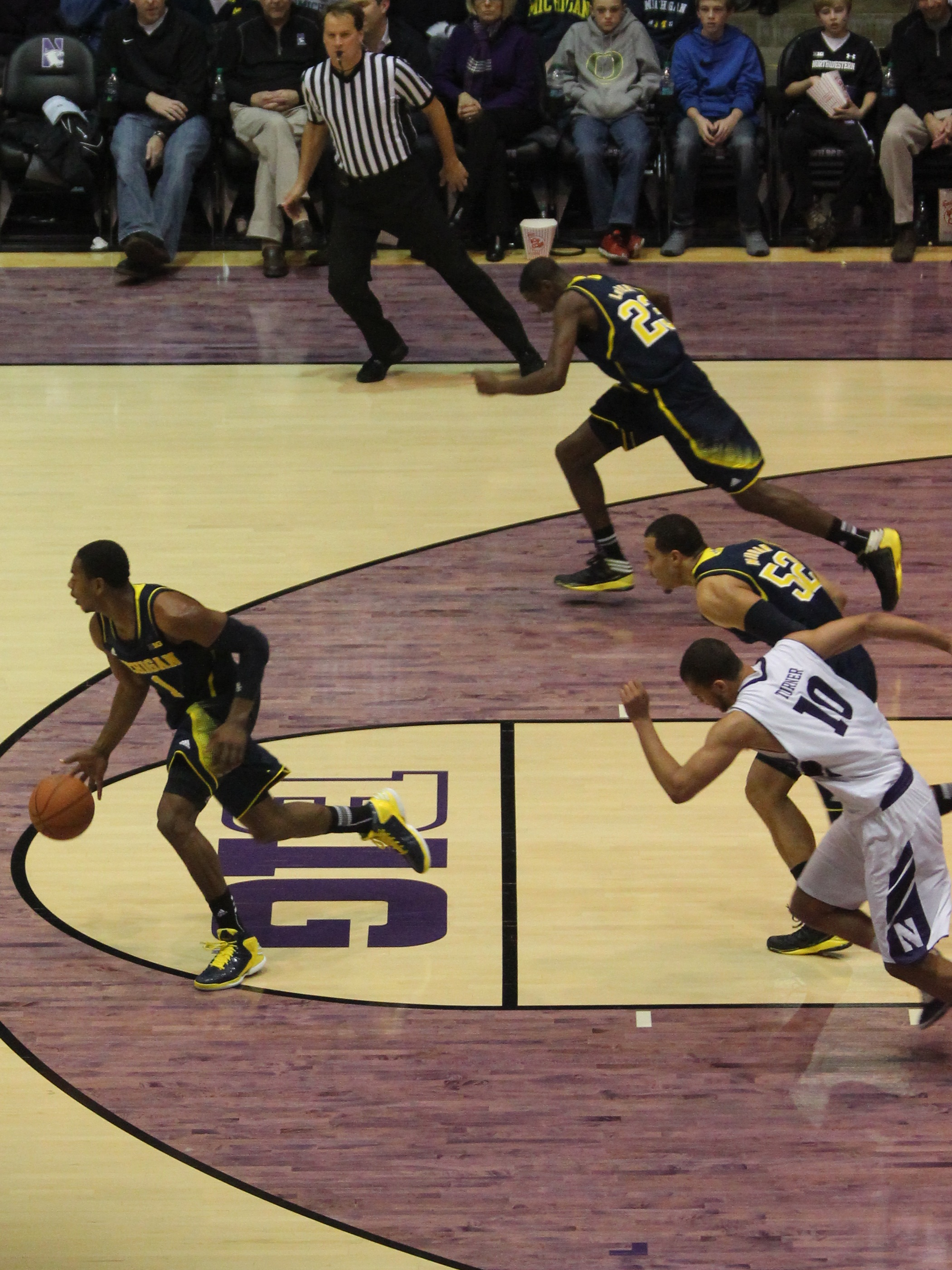
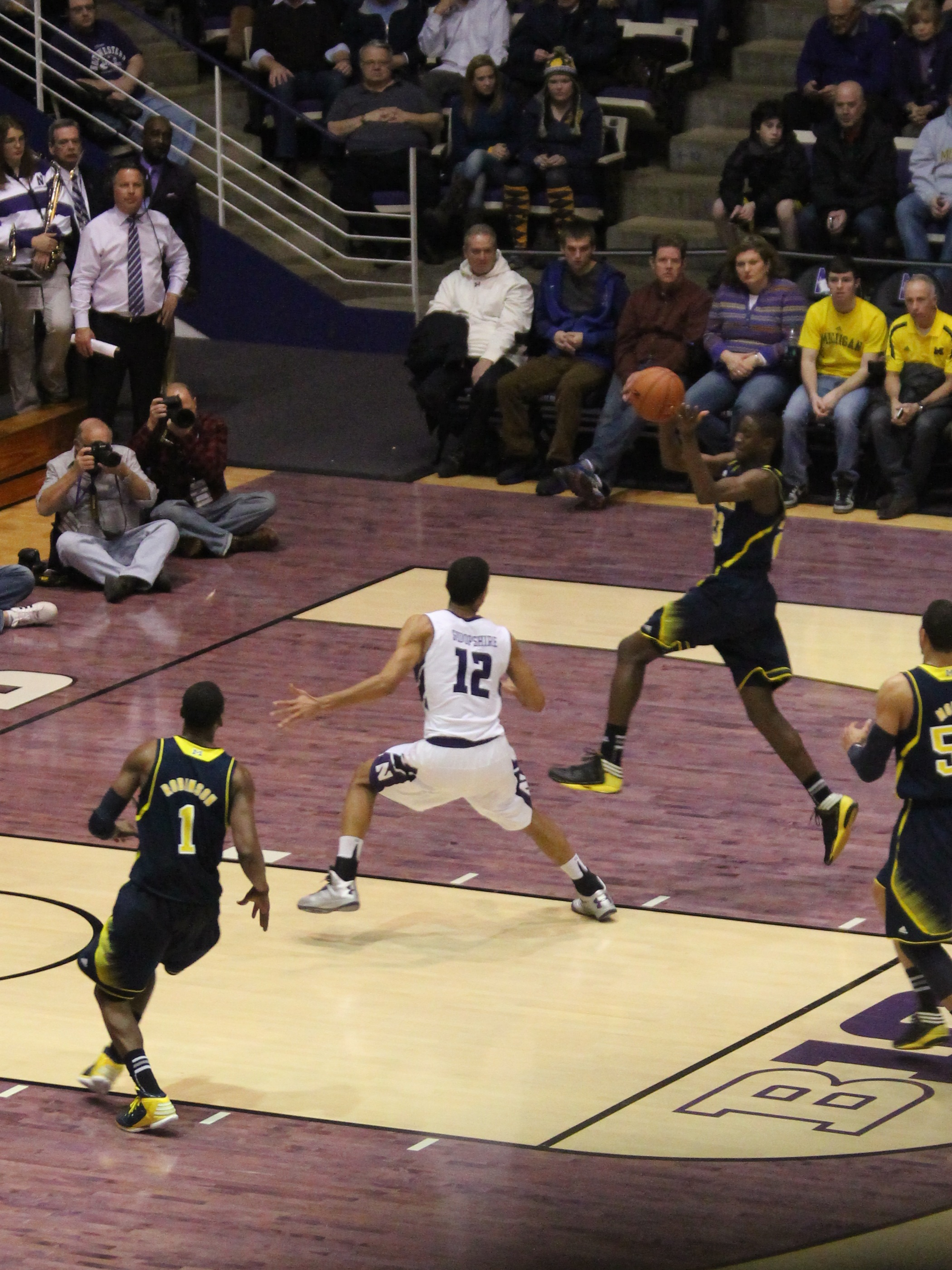
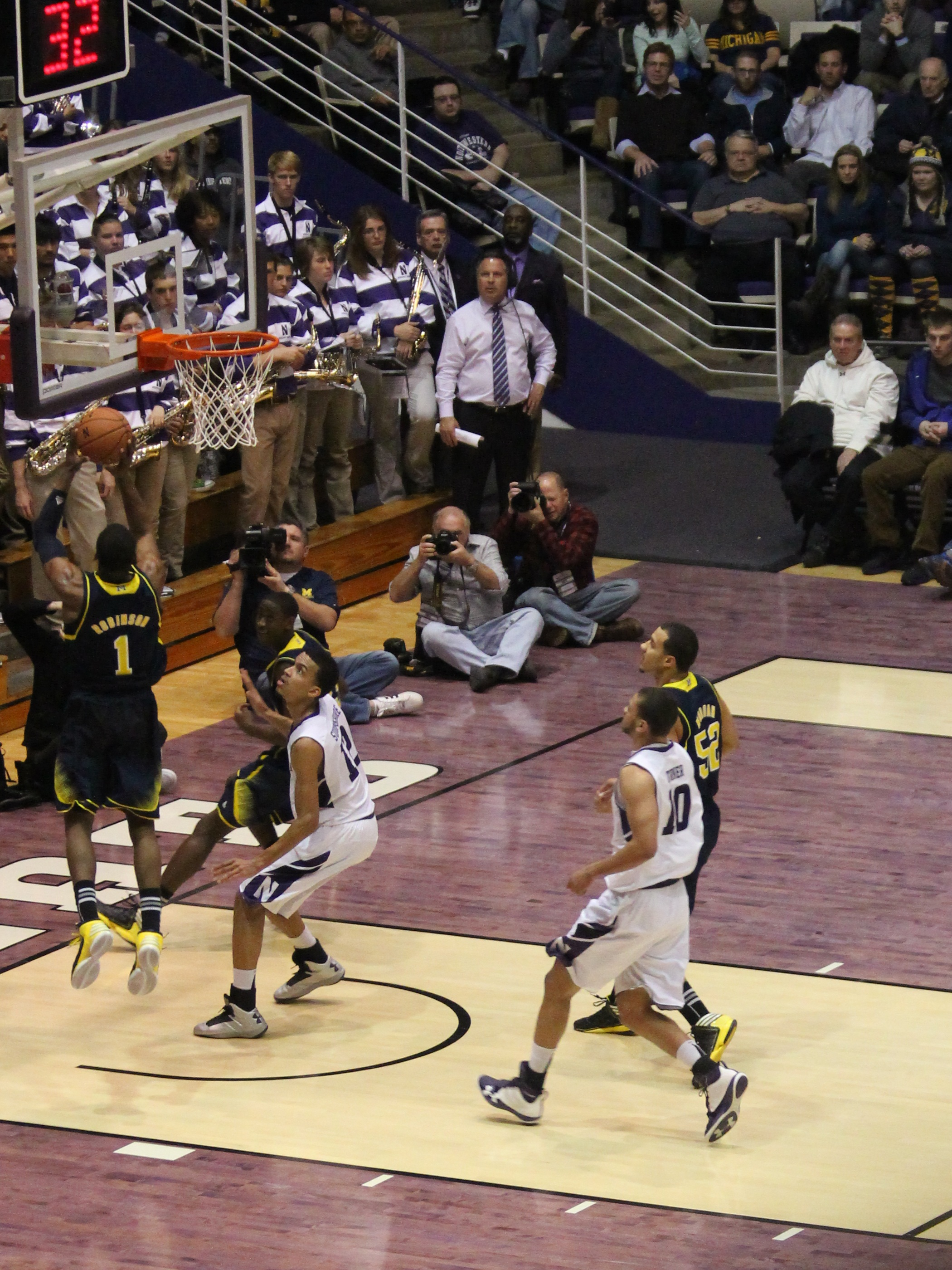
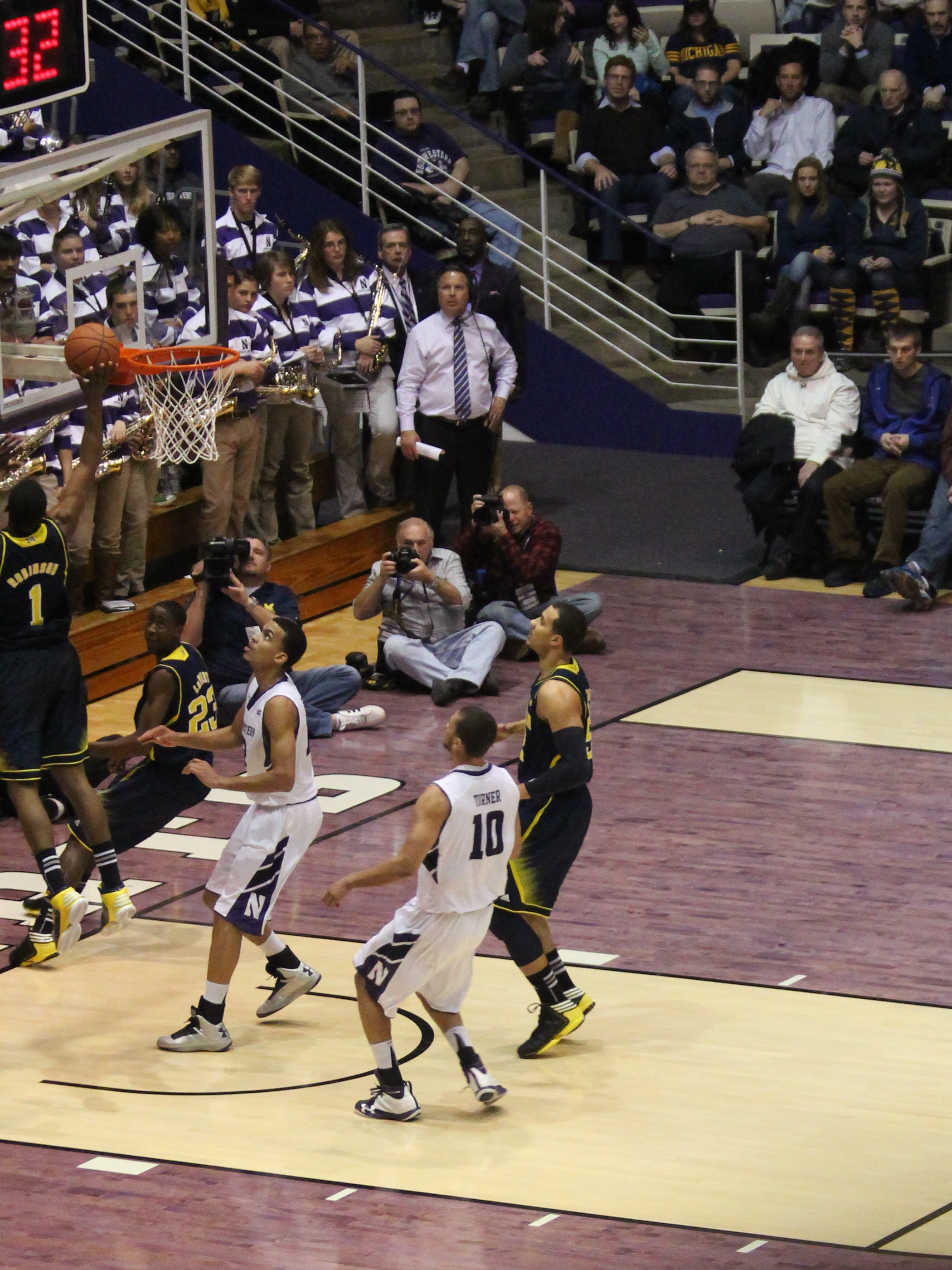
Glenn Robinson III (#1) is the initial fast break ballhandler (left); he passes the ball to Caris LeVert (#23) (image unavailable); Levert passes the ball back to Robinson (center left); Robinson catches the alley oop pass (center right); and Robinson completes the fast break with a bank shot (right) for Michigan during its 2012–13 Big Ten Conference season opener on January 3 against Northwestern.

Fast break is an offensive strategy in basketball and handball. In a fast break, a team attempts to move the ball up court and into scoring position as quickly as possible, so that the defense is outnumbered and does not have time to set up. The various styles of the fast break–derivative of the original created by Frank Keaney–are seen as the best method of providing action and quick scores. A fast break may result from cherry picking. Cam Henderson is recognized as one of the early innovators of the fast break at Marshall University, and he also developed the 2–3 zone defense.

== Description ==
In a typical fast-break situation, the defending team obtains the ball and passes it to the fastest player, who sets up the fast break. That player (usually the smaller point guard, in the case of basketball) then speed-dribbles the ball up the court with several players trailing on the wings. He then either passes it to another player for quick scoring or takes the shot himself. If contact is made between him and a defender from behind while on a fast break, an unsportsmanlike foul is called. Recognition, speed, ball-handling skills, and decision-making are critical to the success of a fast break.

In basketball, fast breaks are often the result of good defensive play such as a steal, obtaining the ball off a block, or a missed shot by the opposing team and a rebound, where the defending team takes possession of the ball and the other team has not adjusted.

A fast break can sometimes lead to an alley-oop if there are more offensive players than defenders.

In basketball, if the fast break did not lead to a basket and an offensive rebound is obtained and put back quickly, this is called a secondary break.

== Fly fast break ==
Basketball playbook
Fly Fastbreak
- Type: Full court offense

Name usage
- Technical name: One out fastbreak
- Common name: Fly fastbreak

Play development credit
- Designed first by: Frank Keaney, University of Rhode Island: Coach unknown United States
- Year play first used: early 1900s
- Play first used by: Frank Keaney
- Country: United States

Play history
- Though the origins of the play's development are unknown, the "Fly" Fast Break was the answer to defeating the Line Defense.
- Step by Step: [n/a]

A fly fast break (also known as a one out fast break, the technical term for the play) is a basketball move in which after a shot is attempted, the player who is guarding the shooter does not box out or rebound but instead runs down the court looking for a pass from a rebounding teammate for a quick score.

=== How to play the Fly fast break ===
The coach designates a certain guard or guards to carry out the Fly fast break. This is often the guard that defends the opponents' shooting guard. When the designated opposing guard makes an attempted shot. The defending guard (referred to as 'Fly') will contest the shot but then sprints down the court to the other team's key. When the defending team obtains the rebound or has to inbound the ball (after a made basket), they throw the ball into the other team's key, knowing that there is a 'Fly' waiting to catch the ball and score.

=== Strengths ===
- Defeats the zone - the other team doesn't have time to set up their zone defense.
- Removes a rebounder - because the shooter has to defend against the Fly, they are removed from rebounding.
- Upsets the shooter - because the shooter has to worry about defense, they are less focused on their shooting.

=== Weaknesses ===
- Rebounding weakness - The Fly's team is left with a 4 against 5 rebounding ratio, if the shooter stays to rebound.
- Inbounding - If a shooter scores, the inbounding set up takes longer and the distance to throw the ball is harder.
- Exhausting - The Fly has to sprint on offense, but has to hustle back on defense if the Fly fast break fails.

=== Breaking Down the Fly fast break ===
Breaking down the Fly fast break can be done in two ways:

- Have a confident shooter who can score and force the defending team to inbound while the shooter hustles back to defend against the Fly.
- Use non-shooting plays, where the #4 & #5 forwards do the scoring.

=== Notes ===
The 'Fly' is a term in fly fishing where the actions of this type of fishing are similar to the actions of the basketball player in Fly fast break.
