= Line defense =

Basketball strategy

Basketball playbook
Line Defense
- Type: Half court zone defense

Name Usage
- Technical name: Line Defense
- Common name: Line Defense

Play Development Credit
- Designed 1st by: Coach Walter Meanwell United Kingdom
- Year play 1st used: 1911
- Play 1st used by: University of Wisconsin–Madison
- Country: United States

Play History
- Walter E. "Doc" Meanwell, a native of England, developed what he called "scientific basketball". Doc Meanwell became the basketball coach in University of Wisconsin–Madison in 1911 and went on to develop Line Defense, which won the Wisconsin Badgers 8 championships in 1912, 1913, 1914, 1916, 1921, 1923, 1924, and 1929.
- Step by Step: [n/a]

Line defense is a strategy used in basketball. It is referred to as the "line defense" because of its formation on the court, which consists of two lines of defense. Three players at the front of the defense (at the half-court center line) and two players behind (between the center line and the team's own key). The line was the first zone concept to be used in basketball. The line defense was developed to counter the fast break plays that were being developed, and adopted, at the time. The line defense was the catalyst of the future 3-2 zone defense.

== How to play ==
After the team has made a basket, or has turned over the ball, they will sprint back across the center line and turn around to pick up their checks. They form two lines of defense; the first line is made of three forwards and the second line is made of the two remaining guards. The first line allows the first two players to pass through the line (to be picked up by the two guards in the back) and then the forwards will challenge the remaining checks coming across the line. The plan was to make the other team lose the dribble or make a bad pass. The play was not a true zone as the players realigned themselves with their checks as they approached the center line, making the play a man-to-man defense.

== Strengths ==
- Helps turn the ball over before the opposing team has a chance to take a shot on basket.
- Helps cover up potentially weak defensive players on the team.

== Weaknesses ==
- Undefended basket – because the defensive line was so far up from the defending key, any offensive player that got behind the line would have an easy time scoring a basket without a challenge.

== Breaking down ==
Teams started to break down the line defense when they were able to get an offensive player(s) behind the line before the defending team was able to set up the defensive line. This helped to create plays such as the fly fast break, the fast break, or the 2-Out Fast break.

== Notes ==
- Walter "Doc" Meanwell was a football coach, at University of Wisconsin–Madison, before he started coaching basketball at the university. The Line Defense was a defensive line play formation, in American football strategy, that was applied to basketball.
