= Josh Sewell =

American football player (born 1981)

No. 79
- Position: Center

Personal information
- Born: July 26, 1981 (age 45); Lincoln, Nebraska, U.S.
- Listed height: 6 ft 2 in (1.88 m)
- Listed weight: 300 lb (136 kg)

Career information
- High school: Lincoln Southeast
- College: Nebraska
- NFL draft: 2004: 6th round, 190th overall pick

Career history
- 2004–2005: Denver Broncos*
- 2007: Frankfurt Galaxy
- * Offseason or practice squad member only

Josh Sewell (born July 26, 1981) is an American former professional football center and interior offensive lineman.

== Early life ==
Sewell was part of a Lincoln Southeast High School football team that took consecutive state titles in 1997 and 1998, playing both defense (nose tackle) and offense (offensive guard), while earning all-city and all-state honors to accompany his Class A heavyweight powerlifting championship.

== College career ==
Sewell committed to Indiana State, redshirting for his freshman season of 1999, and ultimately played only one season, 2000, before transferring to the University of Nebraska–Lincoln, and sitting out the 2001 season in compliance of NCAA transfer eligibility rules. He resumed in 2002 as a junior, playing in five games, as a reserve center. A productive senior season saw Sewell start all 13 Cornhusker games, and earn honorable mention All-Big 12 and second-team academic All-Big 12 honors.

== Professional career ==
After being selected in the sixth round, 190th overall, by the Denver Broncos in the 2004 NFL draft, Sewell was released on September 5, 2004, and re-signed to the practice squad, the following day.

He inexplicably retired during mini-camp in 2005, and did not resurface, until his selection in the 10th round of the 2007 NFL Europa Free Agent Draft by the Frankfurt Galaxy, then coached by Mike Jones. In the inaugural All American Football League Draft in 2008, Team Alabama, led by head coach Jones, selected Sewell with their first pick, the 6th overall in the first round.
