= 2–3 zone defense =

Defensive strategy in basketball

Basketball playbook
- 2–3 zone initial alignment

2–3 zone Defense
- Type: Half court zone defense

Name Usage
- Technical name: 2–3 zone Defense
- Common name: 2–3 zone
- Other common names: 2–1–2 zone

Play Development Credit
- Designed 1st by: Coach Cam Henderson
- Year play 1st used: 1914
- Play 1st used by: Bristol high school
- Country: United States

The 2–3 zone defense is a defensive strategy used in basketball as an alternative to man-to-man defense. It is referred to as the 2–3 because of its formation on the court, which consists of two players at the front of the defense (closer to half court) and three players behind (closer to the team's basket).

== History ==
In 1914, Eli Camden "Cam" Henderson's Bristol High School first used a 3–2 zone defense against Clair Bee's team, Grafton YMCA, in West Virginia. The zone defense was used because the gym floor was made of green pine and it was very slippery when wet, when the roof leaked.

The 3–2 zone defense did not provide the rebounding support for the fast break that Cam Henderson was using. The top defender dropped back to form the 2–3 zone. Henderson developed this style of basketball successfully at Davis & Elkins College, before moving on to coach at Marshall University.

In 1938, Marshall University upset Long Island University, to snap their 40-game winning streak.

In 1947, Henderson led Marshall to a National Association of Intercollegiate Athletics (NAIA) championship title with his 2–3 zone defense and fast break offense.

In 2003, Syracuse University coach Jim Boeheim led his team to an NCAA tournament championship playing the 2–3 zone, which has become Boeheim's trademark.

== How to play a 2–3 zone defense ==
The widespread use of the 2–3 zone is likely due to its somewhat intuitive operation. The two players on the top of the zone are usually a team's guards, and they guard the zones closest to them on the perimeter and three-point arc. In the same way, a team's forwards guard the sides of the zone and its center guards the lane and center of the defense. As the opposing team moves with the basketball around the court, the zone as a whole shifts accordingly.

The individuals that make up a 2–3 zone are often described as "being on a string." This means that as one player moves, he pulls the imaginary string (which is attached to every defensive player) and therefore pulls the entire defense in that same direction. As the ball moves throughout the court, every player should shift simultaneously in the direction of the ball. When a player in the zone is shifting, that player should look to fill in gaps of space vacated by other shifting players and also guard offensive players in that space.

For example, if a player with the ball stood on the right wing (beyond the three-point arc), defensive players 1 and 2 would shift towards that direction. To effectively operate the 2–3 zone, a defense must move as a whole. In this case, that would mean every defensive player shifting around 5 to 6 feet in the direction of the right wing and the player with the ball. Similarly, if that player moved to the right corner, the 4 player would move to guard him and the rest of the defense would shift towards that direction. So much so, in fact, that ideally no defensive players should be on the left side of the court at all, because it would require several passes, or a long pass(skip pass) through the defense to get the ball to the left side.

=== Key points of emphasis ===
- Communicate — this is probably the most important thing to remember when playing a 2–3 zone. Players should talk to each other on the court about who's open, who should be where, what to do, and everything else worth knowing. The team must work together, and the best way to do so is to communicate with each other on the floor.
- Players should anticipate the next pass before it happens, so that when it does, each person knows where to go on the floor and fewer breakdowns happen.
- Although it is a zone defense, players should always be aware of the offensive players' locations on the floor. It is more important to guard an open player than stay within the normal constraints of the zone.
- Offensive players closer to the basket take priority. The defense begins at the basket and radiates outwards—the idea is to force the offense to take shots from the perimeter and prevent access to the basket and surrounding area.

== Strengths of the 2–3 zone ==
The 2–3 zone is a very effective defense when executed properly. This defense's strong suits include:

- Forcing outside shots—it generally holds true that as players get further away from the basket, their chances of scoring decrease. The 2–3 essentially fills the middle of the court and is very effective at preventing penetration into the lane and heart of the defense, leaving the perimeter as an offense's most accessible option.
- "Hiding" poor defensive players—because the 2–3 zone is so team-oriented, players who are less effective defensively are less likely to be exploited by the offense. It is very difficult to target just one defensive player in the 2–3 because the zone is always shifting and players work together. Similarly, using a 2–3 more evenly distributes fouls throughout the players on defense, meaning foul-prone players are less likely to accumulate many fouls or foul out.
- Slowing the game (Gibson)—Because the 2–3 often guards the interior of the court well, offenses generally pass the ball around the perimeter frequently before attempting to penetrate the defense or initiate an offense. As a result, it takes longer for an offense to take a shot, and therefore slows the tempo of the game. Therefore, hypothetically defensive players have more time to catch their breath as a result. Also players exert somewhat less energy in a zone than in man-to-man since they often cover less ground while playing defense.
- Fewer offensive plays—There are far fewer zone offenses than there are man-to-man offenses to prepare for as a defense. As a result, defenses often have a better idea of what to expect from the offensive team when playing a zone defense.

== Weaknesses of the 2–3 zone ==
On the other hand, there are many reasons why many coaches prefer not to use the zone. Its strengths can easily become its weaknesses, which include:

- Perimeter scoring—because the 2–3 zone often leaves some parts of the perimeter wide open for the opposing offense's long-range shooters, offenses that excel at 3-point shots and mid-range jump shots always have a chance to keep the score even (or, to build large leads). This is probably the 2–3's most obvious Achilles' heel.
- Playing from behind—teams that are losing rarely use the 2–3 zone, because it gives the opposing offense ample time—and space—to repeatedly pass the ball around the perimeter, reducing the amount of time left in the game.
- Rebounding—in man-to-man defense, defensive players know whom to "block out" if the shot misses, and an offensive rebound's attempted; each defender covers the individual offensive player they're assigned to personally defend. However, in the 2–3 zone, defensive players do not guard individuals, only areas of the court (zones); so, it is more difficult to quickly and accurately assess where the offensive players are, and which defensive players are supposed to block them out. As a result, 2–3 zones often yield more rebounds for the opposing offense, which can tire out a defense, and/or put them far behind in scoring.
- Gaps in the zone—there are a few areas on the court that often cause breakdowns in the 2–3 zone, especially at the high-post area. The high post/free throw line area (i.e., the center of the 2–3 zone) is often a weak spot in the zone that is exploited by the offense. Multiple defensive players tend to "collapse" (i.e., converge at once) on an offensive player who has the ball in this part of the zone, leaving other offensive players unguarded on the wings, blocks, and/or baseline areas.
- Degree of difficulty—because the 2–3 zone relies so heavily on well-timed teamwork, each individual player must know exactly where to be at all times. Because a zone defense is more complex than simply following one player always following his counterpart around the court, there is a higher probability that at least one defensive player will forget which opposing player he/she was assigned to guard. Players must be extremely practiced and knowledgeable to run a 2–3 zone correctly.

== Notes ==
- The 2–3 zone is sometimes called a 2–1–2 zone, simply because the player (usually the center) standing under the basket moves further up on the key. The concept, however, remains the same. The 2–1–2 concept is used when the other team runs cutters to break down the zone.
