= Tim Sandidge =

American gridiron football player (born 1983)

Profile
- Position: Defensive tackle

Personal information
- Born: June 12, 1983 (age 43); Lynchburg, Virginia, U.S.
- Listed height: 6 ft 1 in (1.85 m)
- Listed weight: 300 lb (136 kg)

Career information
- College: Virginia Tech
- NFL draft: 2006: undrafted

Career history
- St. Louis Rams (2006)*; Kansas City Chiefs (2006); St. Louis Rams (2007)*; Hamburg Sea Devils (2007); San Diego Chargers (2007)*; Team Tennessee (2008); Montreal Alouettes (2008–2009?)
- * Offseason or practice squad member only

Tim Sandidge (born June 12, 1983) is an American former football defensive tackle. He was originally signed by the St. Louis Rams as an undrafted free agent in 2006. He played college football at Virginia Tech.

Sandidge was drafted by Team Tennessee of the All-American Football League in the second round, on January 26, 2008.

On February 16, 2008, Sandidge was signed by the Montreal Alouettes of the Canadian Football League (CFL).
