= Basketball playbook =

Book of plays used in basketball

A basketball playbook is a collection of plays and strategies used by a basketball team during games. Playbooks can cover offensive, defensive, and inbounding situations. Offensive systems include motion and continuity offenses, as well as plays designed for use against zone defenses. Defensive systems include man-to-man and zone defenses, with both half-court and full-court variations. Inbounding plays may be designed for either sideline or baseline situations.

== Man offense plays ==
Man to man offense is commonly referred to as man offense, and as the name implies, the player is matched up with their checks (defender).

=== Motion offense ===
Motion offenses are governed by a set of rules which have everyone in motion. When numbers are used in motion (e.g. 4 out 1 in motion), the first number refers to the number of players outside the three-point line and the second number refers to the players inside the three-point line.

- 5 out motion offense (simple and screen away)
- 3-2 motion offense
- 4 out 1 in motion offense
- Dribble drive motion offense
- Princeton offense
- Triangle offense

=== Continuity offense ===
Continuity offense are a pattern of movements and passes, which eveads back to the starting formation, and the play can repeat itself again.

- Flex offense
- Shuffle offense
- Swing offense

== Zone offense plays ==
- 2-3 zone breaks
- 3-2 zone breaks
- 1-2-2 zone breaks
- 1-3-1 zone breaks
- 4-out zone offense
- 5-out zone offense
- Box and 1 offense
- Half-court press breakers

== Man defense plays ==
Man to man defense is where the defender follows their check (offensive player) through their movement on the court.

The court is divided into four parts. Any number that is in the 40s refers to the full court. Any number that is in the 20s is half-court.

Any number that ends in '0' means that everyone stays with their check. Any number that ends in '1' means that the first pass is double teamed or trapped. Any number which ends in '2' means that the second pass is attacked with a double team or a trap. Any number that ends in '3' means to fake an attack on the first pass, but then return to normal. Any number ending in '4' means that the player that is furthest away from the ball handler, attacks the ball handler.

=== Full-court man to man ===
- 40 man to man
- 41 man to man
- 42 man to man
- 43 man to man
- 44 man to man

=== Half-court man to man ===
- 20 man to man
- 21 man to man
- 22 man to man
- 23 man to man
- 24 man to man

==== Pack-line defense ====
The pack-line defense was created by former college coach Dick Bennett while serving at Green Bay using principles from several other man-to-man systems. Bennett further developed the system at his later stops at Wisconsin and Washington State. His son Tony, who played for him at Green Bay and went on to serve under him as an assistant before succeeding him at Washington State, would go on to even greater success using the system at his next stop of Virginia.

In this system, one player pressures the ball at all times. The name of the defense reflects the behavior of the other four defenders—they attempt to "pack" within an imaginary "line" located about 2 feet (0.6 m) inside the three-point line, with the main goal of stopping dribble penetration, only venturing outside the line if their assigned player is preparing to receive a pass. When the elder Bennett first developed the system, he actually taped a "pack line" to Green Bay's practice court as a teaching tool, and when he moved to Wisconsin had a similar line painted on the team's practice court. The system has become increasingly popular in 21st-century college basketball. Among the other prominent coaches using the system include Chris Mack (Xavier, now College of Charleston) and Sean Miller (Arizona). Variations of the system have been used by Ben Jacobson at Northern Iowa and Brad Stevens when he coached at Butler.

== Zone defense plays ==
Zone defenses requires that a defender cover an area on the court, and does not follow a check, but covers a check that comes into their area.

=== Half-court zone defense ===
- Line defense
- 2-3 zone defense
- 3-2 zone defense
- 1-3-1 zone defense
- 1-2-2 zone defense
- Amoeba defense
- Match-up zone
- Trap Zone

=== Full-court pressure defense ===
- 1-2-2 Viking press
- 2-2-1 box press
- 1-2-1-1 diamond press
- Half-court press
- Full-court press
- Match-up press

== Inbounding plays ==
When the ball goes out of bounds, there are in bounding plays designed to score

=== Sideline plays ===
- Stack
- 4-1 box
- box

=== Baseline plays ===
These plays are used to score, while in bounding, from under the opponent's baseline.

- Stack
- Box plays
- Press break

== Sources ==
- ESPN article on triangle offense by Shamik Pandit
