= Kennedale, Texas =

- City
- Location of Kennedale in Tarrant County, Texas
- Coordinates: 32°37′50″N 97°13′02″W
- Country: United States
- State: Texas
- County: Tarrant

Government
  - Type: Council-Manager

Area
  - Total: 6.62 sq mi (17.15 km^{2})
  - Land: 6.61 sq mi (17.12 km^{2})
  - Water: 0.012 sq mi (0.03 km^{2})
- Elevation: 656 ft (200 m)

Population (2020)
  - Total: 8,517
  - Estimate (2025): 10,626
  - Density: 1,288/sq mi (497.5/km^{2})
- Time zone: UTC-6 (CST)
  - Summer (DST): UTC-5 (CDT)
- ZIP code: 76060, 76140
- Area code: 817
- FIPS code: 48-38896
- GNIS feature ID: 2410183
- Website: www.cityofkennedale.com

Kennedale is a city in Tarrant County, Texas, United States. The city had a population of 8,517 as of 2020.

== History ==
Settled in the 1860s, the community was named for Oliver S. Kennedy, who platted the area and donated every other lot to the Southern Pacific Railroad. Linda Rhodes is the first female mayor.

== Geography ==
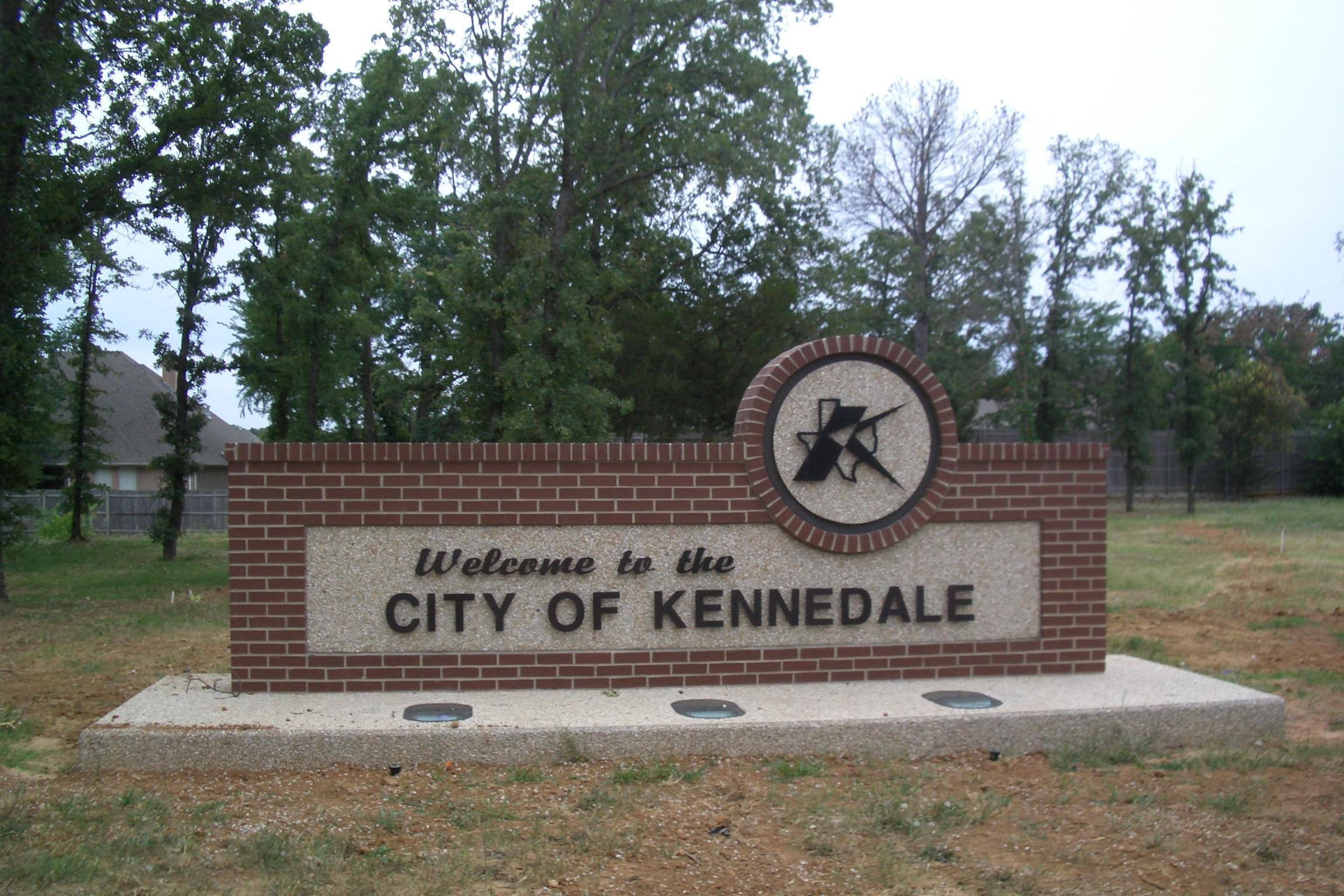
Welcome sign to the City of Kennedale

According to the United States Census Bureau, the city has a total area of 6.6 square miles (17.1 km^{2}), of which 0.01 square miles (0.03 km^{2}), or 0.19%, is water.

== Demographics ==
Historical population
Census	Pop.	Note	%±
1950	1,046		—
1960	1,521		45.4%
1970	3,076		102.2%
1980	2,594		−15.7%
1990	4,096		57.9%
2000	5,850		42.8%
2010	6,763		15.6%
2020	8,517		25.9%
2025 (est.)	10,626		24.8%
U.S. Decennial Census

=== 2020 census ===
As of the 2020 census, Kennedale had a population of 8,517 and a median age of 40.1 years; 24.4% of residents were under the age of 18 and 15.0% were 65 years of age or older.

For every 100 females there were 94.9 males, and for every 100 females age 18 and over there were 92.6 males age 18 and over.

The 2020 census reported that 97.9% of residents lived in urban areas, while 2.1% lived in rural areas.

The census counted 3,018 households, of which 38.9% had children under 18 living in them; 57.8% were married-couple households, 13.7% were households with a male householder and no spouse or partner present, and 23.1% were households with a female householder and no spouse or partner present. About 18.5% of all households were made up of individuals and 8.4% had someone living alone who was 65 years of age or older.

There were 3,183 housing units, of which 5.2% were vacant. The homeowner vacancy rate was 0.8% and the rental vacancy rate was 8.8%.

Racial composition as of the 2020 census
Race	Number	Percent
White	5,176	60.8%
Black or African American	1,206	14.2%
American Indian and Alaska Native	87	1.0%
Asian	393	4.6%
Native Hawaiian and Other Pacific Islander	3	0.0%
Some other race	591	6.9%
Two or more races	1,061	12.5%
Hispanic or Latino (of any race)	1,610	18.9%

== Climate ==
The climate in this area is characterized by hot, humid summers and generally mild to cool winters. According to the Köppen climate classification, Kennedale has a humid subtropical climate, Cfa on climate maps.

== Economy ==
=== Top employers ===
According to Kennedale's 2024 Annual Comprehensive Financial Report, the top employers in the city are:

#	Employer	# of Employees
1	Sabre Industries/Fort Worth Tower	450-500
2	Kennedale ISD	400-450
3	Speed Fab Crete	100-150
4	ARK Contracting Services	50-100
4	Hawk Steel	50-100
4	Hexpol Compounding	50-100
4	RE Watson & Associates	50-100
4	Harrison Jet Guns	50-100
4	City of Kennedale	50-100
10	Quick Roofing	25-50
