= All American Football League =

- Sport: American football
- Founded: 2007; 19 years ago
- Folded: 2010; 16 years ago
- No. of teams: 6 (proposed)
- Country: United States
- Last champion: N/A
- Website: AllAmericanFootballLeague.com

The All American Football League (AAFL) was a proposed professional American football minor league. The league, which was to combine a professional pay structure with the requirement that all players be college graduates, had originally been scheduled to start in the spring of 2007, but later postponed its launch to the spring of 2008, only to cancel its 2008 season a month before kickoff and suspend its launch until the next year. The league again postponed their launch each successive year, with the final postponement taking place in February 2010; despite that postponement it was stated that the league's first game would take place in spring 2011. As of spring 2011 there were no further actions from the league.

== League formation and structure ==
The All American Football League was to be a professional american football league premised on the rule that all of its players had to have a four-year university degree, as employees of the AAFL rather than of the franchises, with the league to pay each player an average compensation of approximately $100,000 to year-round player employees and $50,000 to season-only players to attract the best non-NFL players. Also that the former college players would play in college stadiums. The AAFL's inaugural draft took place on January 26, 2008, though it was effectively voided when the league canceled that season.

=== Teams ===
For its proposed 2008 season, the AAFL established six franchises, all but one of which were located in the Southern United States (Team Michigan being the lone exception). One of the more unusual features of the league was that the teams had no nicknames, being referred to as "Team Florida", "Team Texas", etc. The teams, which had hired coaches, drafted players, and contracted with stadiums to host games for 2008 were:

- Team Alabama – (Birmingham, Legion Field), coached by Mike Jones, former head coach of the Frankfurt Galaxy in NFL Europa. The team includes former Alabama Crimson Tide players Reggie Myles, Alonzo Ephraim, and Marcus Spencer, Auburn Tigers players Karibi Dede, Tre Smith and Kendall Mack, Troy Trojans players Rob Austin and Franklin Lloyd, Princeton player Ben Brielmaier, as well as UAB players Ernest Respress and Shamar Abrams
- Team Arkansas – (Little Rock, War Memorial Stadium), coached by Ron Calcagni. Signed players include former Razorback stars Clint Stoerner and Zac Tubbs.
- Team Florida – (Gainesville, Ben Hill Griffin Stadium), coached by Shane Matthews. Signed players include former Gators quarterback Chris Leak and former FSU standout and 1st round draft pick, Peter Warrick. The two final home games would have been played in Jacksonville Municipal Stadium, Jacksonville and Raymond James Stadium, Tampa.
- Team Michigan – (Detroit, Ford Field), coached by John Fontes, former assistant coach of the Detroit Lions. Players have been signed from Central Michigan University, Ferris State University, Michigan State University, University of Michigan and Western Michigan University.
- Team Tennessee – (Knoxville, Neyland Stadium), coached by Andy Kelly. Signed players included former Clemson quarterback Woodrow Dantzler, former XFL star and NFL player Rod Smart, better known as "He Hate Me", and former University of Tennessee kicker James Wilhoit.
- Team Texas – (Houston, Rice Stadium), coached by former University of Houston coach John Jenkins. Eric Crouch, the 2001 Heisman Trophy winner, was drafted by them.

None of these teams actually played a single game before the league announced it was relaunching.

The league was unveiled at a press conference in New York City on July 26, 2006, with Cedric Dempsey, former president of the NCAA, as its chairman. Before that, Dempsey was the longtime athletic director at the University of Arizona. The rest of the league's Board of Directors included various well-known sports and private industry individuals.

The league signed agreements from a specific, manageable target list of football tradition-rich universities and prominent stadiums which would host games during the spring months. Each team drafted and/or signed players that graduated from the host state's universities. The AAFL draft took place on January 26 and 27, 2008. An AAFL release stated that a player "must, without exception, have earned a four-year degree or more advanced degree to be eligible to play in League games." The release added that other players would be invited to try out "in the hopes that the opportunity will inspire them to complete their education".

With the demise of NFL Europa, the AAFL would have had to have competed with the Arena Football League and the then-af2 for talent among spring football leagues. According to the Associated Press report of the league's formation, Dempsey had stated that AAFL players would earn about $100,000 a season, as compared to the $30,000 minimum then paid by the Arena Football League. Moreover, the league, rather than the franchise owners, would pay the players and coaches in order to control spending. Later, however, the league announced that "During its initial season, most players will be paid $5,000 per game plus benefits, slightly higher than the salaries of the now defunct XFL. Six players on each team will be designated as franchise players, who will be eligible for an additional $50,000 per year."

The league announced a 10-game season for 2008, from April 12 to June 14, with all six teams to have played in one division during the first season. The teams with the second and third best records in the regular season were to meet in a playoff for the right to face the number one team in a championship game to be played on July 3, 2008. The AAFL released its schedule in October, 2007, with the April 12, 2008 games consisting of Alabama at Florida (at Jacksonville), Arkansas at Texas, and Michigan at Tennessee. The AAFL held its kickoff tryouts on July 2–3, 2007, in Orlando, Florida. On July 26, tryouts were held in Birmingham, Alabama; more followed in Little Rock, Arkansas (August 18); Detroit, Michigan (September 13); Tampa, Florida on October 12; Houston, Texas on October 24 and 25; and Knoxville, Tennessee (December 6 and 7).

The AAFL had announced partnerships with New Balance, official supplier of on-field AAFL team apparel; Schutt Sports, official supplier of helmets and protective equipment; Baden, official supplier of AAFL footballs; Rogers Athletic Company, official supplier of football equipment; and the NFL Officiating Department, which will provide officiating support.

== Postponement of inaugural season ==
On March 13, 2008, the league announced that the 2008 season would not take place and expressed hope that the league might play in 2009. The AAFL website issued a statement that "The All American Football League (AAFL) announced today the postponement of its inaugural season until 2009. The League will continue to build upon the foundation that has been established, and will continue to discuss opportunities with potential investors. AAFL sponsors have committed to remain on board for the 2009 season. Currently, the League has corporate partnerships with New Balance, Baden Sports and Rogers Athletic. Also still in place for the 2009 season are a national radio partnership with Touchdown Radio & SportsDay Productions, and an internet broadcast partnership with PlayOn! Sports, a division of Turner Broadcasting." Keenan Davis, vice-president of league operations and Chief Operating Officer said that "We are so very fortunate to have built partnerships with companies who are partners in the truest sense of the word. We sincerely appreciate their support as we progress toward our new goal of a 2009 inaugural season." The league press release added that "All fans who have purchased tickets to 2008 AAFL games will receive a full refund. Credit cards will be credited and any checks received will be returned."

The Houston Business Journal reported that Team Texas had sold only 250 season tickets, and that team president Mike Pede had announced that the ten employees of Team Texas would be laid off and would "receive severance depending on their length of time with the organization".

In 2008, The league had announced it was considering a postponement of its season, stating that "Since inception, the League's finances have been indirectly tied to the $300 billion federally guaranteed student loan asset backed securities market. In August, the sub prime mortgage crisis began spreading into other sectors such as municipal bonds and federally guaranteed student loans. The situation, which was considered to be temporary at the time, has continued to worsen. Despite the fact that the Federal Reserve has repeatedly lowered interest rates during this financial crisis, their efforts have not yet restored liquidity in many asset backed markets, including municipal bonds and student loans."

All players signed to AAFL teams were immediately released and were free to sign elsewhere.

=== Cessation of operations ===
The league remained largely silent since the March 2008 announcement. The only action known to have been taken by the league was a March 2009 announcement on the league Web site (the previous version of which was taken down at that time) stating that the league was aiming for a spring 2010 launch, with new host markets. In February 2010, after another prolonged silence from the league, the league's Webmaster changed the number 2010 to 2011 but left everything else unchanged. There were no updates on the situation afterwards, and the spring 2011 mark remained on the AAFL Web site into 2012, with no other actions or updates—by March 2013.

== Television and radio ==
The AAFL draft was broadcast live on the league's website, and on several stations.

A national radio contract with Sirius Satellite Radio was announced. The league president confirmed a deal with Sirius and even talked talks about possible TV deals, along with a radio broadcast deal for all games produced by Touchdown Radio Productions (a college football syndication service) and distribution through the American Forces Network and Sports Byline USA. Even after the cancellation of the 2008 season, the league still said they had reached an agreement in principle with NFL Network to carry games once play commenced.

== Board of directors ==
A diverse group of leaders from within intercollegiate athletics was to have served as the board of directors:

- Cedric W. Dempsey, former president of the National Collegiate Athletic Association (NCAA) and former AD at the University of Arizona.
- Doug Dickey, former AD at the University of Tennessee, former head coach at the University of Tennessee and former head coach at the University of Florida.
- Dr. Martin Massengale, former chancellor of the University of Nebraska–Lincoln and president of the University of Nebraska.
- Dr. Charles Young, former chancellor at the University of California, Los Angeles and former president of the University of Florida.
- Gene Corrigan, former athletic director of the University of Notre Dame and Commissioner of the Atlantic Coast Conference.
- Marcus Katz, former student loan executive.
- Pete Dalis, retired athletic director at UCLA.
- Jack Lengyel, former AD at the University of Missouri and the U.S. Naval Academy, and president of the National Association of College Athletic Directors. As the head coach at Marshall University during 1971–74, Lengyel was portrayed in the 2006 film We Are Marshall.
- Gary R. Roberts, dean of the School of Law of Indiana University and former vice dean, professor of law and director of sports law at Tulane University.
- Dr. Charles Wethington, former president of the University of Kentucky and chairman of the NCAA executive committee.

== AAFL Draft ==
Inaugural AAFL Draft logo

The AAFL Draft took place in Atlanta on Saturday, January 26, 2008. The first player selected overall was Zarah Yisrael, offensive lineman from Troy University, who was picked by Team Arkansas. The 2001 Heisman Trophy award winner Eric Crouch was selected with the third pick by Team Texas.

Under the draft rules, each team was permitted to designate a number of "protected" players from schools within their area. Thus, Team Florida listed, as protected, former Gators' quarterback Chris Leak, as well as players from Florida colleges. Team Texas could put players from Texas schools on its list. The downside to listing a large number of players as "protected" was that they forfeited a few picks early in the draft. Each team had a total of 50 picks; the protected players counted against this number, and were counted as having been selected in the middle rounds.
