= Garland F. Pinholster =

American coach and politician (1928–2020)

Biographical details
- Born: February 19, 1928; Clyattville, Georgia, U.S.
- Died: September 20, 2020 (aged 92); Ball Ground, Georgia, U.S.

Playing career

Basketball
- 1948–1950: North Georgia

Coaching career (HC unless noted)

Basketball
- 1956–1966: Oglethorpe

Accomplishments and honors

Awards
- Oglethorpe Athletic Hall of Fame; Georgia Sports Hall of Fame
Medal record
Head coach for United States
Basketball
Pan American Games
Gold medal – first place	1963 São Paulo	Team Competition

Garland Folsom Pinholster (February 19, 1928 – September 20, 2020) was an athletic director as well as college basketball, baseball, and tennis coach, elected to the Oglethorpe Athletic Hall of Fame in its inaugural year of 1962. He is also a member of the Georgia Sports Hall of Fame.

== Early years ==
Pinholster was born in Clyattville, Georgia. He served in the United States Army and was commissioned a lieutenant. He was a basketball player for North Georgia College, a member of a team that won a state title in 1950.

== Oglethorpe University ==
Pinholster most notably coached at Oglethorpe University from 1956 to 1966.

=== Basketball ===
He compiled a 181–67 record as a basketball coach. Pinholster developed the wheel offense, an offensive strategy developed in the late 1950s. It is a kind of continuity offense in which players move around in a circular pattern to create good scoring opportunities. The wheel offense is a popular offensive play, frequently used by teams from middle school to college levels because it can effectively work against any defense, including zone defense and man-to-man defense. He is one proposed inventor for the foul-line huddle. His teams were notable for their defense.

He wrote several books on the sport, including Coach's Guide to Modern Basketball Defense .

== United States national basketball ==
He coached the United States men's national basketball team including a gold medal finish at the 1963 Pan American Games and fourth-place finish in the 1963 FIBA World Championship. The 1963 team included Willis Reed. Former coach Gary Colson once said "Garland Pinholster, for a period of time, was the best coach in the United States."

== Business ==
After his days at Oglethorpe, he became one of Atlanta's most successful business men.

== Politics ==
Pinholster served in the Georgia House of Representatives from 1990 to 2002 and was a Republican. Pinholster became chairman of the minority caucus of the Georgia House of Representatives and was elected to the Georgia State Board of Transportation.

== Death ==
He died on September 20, 2020, in Ball Ground, Georgia at age 92.
