= Krepšiasvydis vyrams =

1922 book by Karolis Dineika

- Cover of the book
- Author: Karolis Dineika
- Language: Lithuanian
- Subject: Basketball
- Genre: Sports educational book
- Published: 1922
- Publication place: Lithuania

Krepšiasvydis vyrams (English: Basketball for men) is regarded as the first basketball educational book in Lithuanian language. It was written by Karolis Dineika in 1922. It is a modest, but significant book for cognition of basketball at that period in Lithuania. During these times, basketball in Lithuania was still called "Krepšiasvydis". It is a mixture of two Lithuanian words: "krepšys" (basket) and "sviesti" (throw). Yet later it was renamed to "Krepšinis". This name is still used nowadays.

== Excerpts ==
In the beginning of the book Dineika claimed that basketball is a much more useful sport than football and compared these two sports.

Dineika in his book described the basketball like that: “Krepšiasvydis is a handheld game. <...> Player by running or walking throws, catches or repulses the ball with his hands. <...> Don‘t try to stand with your head surly lowered. The chest is held protrudingly during most of the playing time. <...> Participants number in krepšiasvydis depends on the court size. As a result, the participants may be 10, 14 or 18. We recommend first number as the most comfortable number for the flow of the game. <...> The participants are divided into two parts (teams). <...> So, if the participants number is 10, every part gets 5. <...> From these five, at least one will be guard (defends the basket), one keeper (tries to return the ball to the attackers) and three attackers, who aims at the opponents basket. <...> To distinguish the parts members, one part members ties bands on their hands. <...> The ball accurately shoot from the free-throw line (free-throw) gives a winning eye (point). The ball, successfully shoot during the zest of the playing time, gives two winning eyes. <...> The part which successfully attacks the basket the most times in a specific period of time – wins.“

Some other Dineika's recommendations were such: „Playing can be done before eating or after 1.5 hour has passed from eating. <...> You must not smoke or drink during the playing time. Especially something cold when you are warmed-up. Consuming the cold drinks kills. <...> You have to avoid the popular bad habit to lay down somewhere on the court (or somewhere else) when you are tired“.

The rules of basketball described by Dineika in the book resembles James Naismith's 13 rules of basketball, however Dineika described 18 rules of basketball, some of which are still valid in modern basketball (e.g. a jump ball between two centers after ball is thrown upwards by a referee in the beginning of a game).
