= Coach (basketball) =

One who directs and strategizes the behavior of a basketball team or player

Basketball coaching is the act of directing and strategizing the behavior of a basketball team or individual basketball player. Basketball coaching typically encompasses the improvement of individual and team offensive and defensive skills, as well as overall physical conditioning. Coaches also have the responsibility to improve their team by player development, strategy, and in-game management. Coaches also teach and inspire their team to be their best.

Coaching is usually performed by a single person, often with the help of one or more assistants.

== Coaching tools ==
A dry erase clipboard or tablet computer with a basketball court outline is often used mid-game to describe plays and provide an overview of the strategy of the opposing team. Coaches strategize and scout opposing teams and find ways to defeat them as easily as possible. At the same time, they overlook their own personal team to start the best five players (only five players can be on floor at one time). Coaches, also, have to be aware of substitutes to put in throughout the game so they can be fresh.

A drill designer is used to sketch drills, plays and information. Coaches also utilise file managers to store all coaching materials in one place and access from anywhere. Planners are also used to blueprint strategies and game plans.

College basketball coach John Wooden would spend two hours each morning with assistants planning out a day's practice minute-by-minute on three-by-five cards. He kept each card year over year to adjust and improve. He would train his players with "mental and emotional" conditioning by always making practice more intense than the game. Players would run faster than what a game would require so that they could be prepared to dominate in the game.

== Coaching strategy ==
A coach's job is to draw up plays and implement systems for the offense and defense. These strategies can mean the difference between winning and losing a game. An offensive coach that is playing against a zone defense needs to create a play for his team to score. Kimble explains that a coach must have a fundamental set that is the base for every play against a zone, because each zone defense is so different (Kimble, 30).

=== Offensive strategy ===
==== Against a man to man defense ====
A coach needs to have a basic play to call against a zone defense and a man to man defense. With a man defense, a coach has an offense that is continuous. A popular offensive schematic is called the flex offense. In the flex offense, we have two guards on the wings, two post on the blocks, and a shooting guard in the corner. The point guard drives the ball to the wing on the side that has the shooting guard. He then swings the ball to the guard on the offside wing and the shooting guard runs his flex cut, past the screen given by the post on the block. The other post pops out to the corner and, ideally, the shooting guard is open in the key and gets an easy layup. If not, the point guard screens down to the post, the post pops up and gets the pass and we are now in position for the other corner to flex cut again. This offense can run continuously until there is a score or a turnover. This offense only works if the coach can teach his players how to cut and screen effectively. 4

==== Against a zone defense ====
When playing against a zone, the idea is to spread the defense thin and then exploit the soft spots in the middle of the zone and when it shifts, use the shooters on the outside. The general layout for any zone offense is a point guard at the top, two shooting guards on the wings, and two posts down low. When the point guard passes to the left, the left post drops to the short corner between the block and the baseline in that soft spot. The other post comes up to the freethrow line extended and makes himself big at the high post. Coaches teach a tactic called inside out. This means that the goal is to feed the ball from the wing into one of the posts. If the high post gets the ball, he faces the basket and has a ton of options. He can drive and score, shoot the ball, feed the low post that cuts to the basket, feed the offside shooting guard that cuts backdoor, or kick it back out to the guard that gave him the ball so he can shoot or drive. The goal is to find the open man, because each time a pass is made, the defense has to shift. The coach must teach the players to look up, run the play, and find the soft spots in the zone with and without the ball. This play base only works if players find open lanes and the players with the ball find the open man. Quick passes cause more shift in the defense.

=== Defensive strategy ===
Regardless of the type of defense, players must be taught some fundamentals, including how to get over a screen, how to box out and rebound, and how to close out a shooter. To do this, a coach must teach positioning over all else so the rest of these skills come easier. Players need to be aggressive. This throws off the offense so they don't pass as well, they rush shots, and forget their fundamentals. A coach needs to teach two things to all his players so they can be confident in taking risks and playing this aggressive style.

Especially guards need to be taught to overplay the passing lanes. This means that they anticipate the pass and jump into the lane when the ball is thrown. This gets steals and scares the offensive guards. The problem is that if your defense does this too often, it leaves the rest of your players vulnerable to an attack when a pass is faked, and the offensive guard cuts back door. This leaves your guard out of position, however, this doesn't have to be a bad thing if you teach your players the second fundamental.

Players must be taught helpside defense. This is a system that must be used no matter what defense you run as a coach. The premise is that the player guarding the ball is right on him, the players guarding someone that is one pass away from the ball, need to play close to them or denying a pass. The other players that are guarding guys that are further from the ball need to sag into the middle to help their teammates. If a defensive player jumps a passing lane, or someone gets beat off the dribble, there must be players that sag off their man to help stop the ball. Once this happens, the defensive player that got beat is responsible to recover and get down to switch with their helpside player. Teaching helpside defense gives a coach's defensive players the confidence to play aggressive defense because they know there is help behind them if they need it.

== Coaching awards ==
- NBA Coach of the Year Award
- EuroLeague Coach of the Year Award
- ABA Coach of the Year Award (defunct)

== See also ==
- Head coach
- Coach (sport)
