= Wheel offense =

Offensive strategy in basketball

Wheel offense is an offensive strategy in basketball, developed in the late 1950s by Garland F. Pinholster at the Oglethorpe University. It is a kind of continuity offense in which players move around in a circular pattern to create good scoring opportunities. The wheel offense is a popular offensive play, frequently used by teams from middle school to college levels because it can effectively work against any defense, including zone defense and man-to-man defense.

== Strategy ==
There are various ways to run the wheel offense. The original form of the wheel offense developed by Garland Pinholster starts with a 2-1-2 formation, where two players stand edge by edge at the free throw lane.

By using sets of screens and cuts, this 2-1-2 formation can be maneuvered into a 1-3-1 formation, with the ball-handler on the wing. Once in position, the player in the low post (the second cutter) will set a screen for the ball-handler (the first cutter). The first cutter quickly passes the ball to the player on top at the perimeter (the fourth cutter), and then, depending on how the defense react, makes a cut to the basket either down the base line or over the top from the free throw line. Meanwhile, the fourth cutter will pass the ball to the player on the other wing (the fifth player), and quickly go down to the free throw lane and set a screen for the second cutter. The second cutter then make another cut across the free throw line. After the first two cuts are clear, the player in the middle at the free throw lane (the third cutter), who have been setting double screens for the previous two cuts, will now fake a step towards the basket and then break off to the top on the side of the circle, and the fourth cutter will go to the wing position initially taken by the first cutter. Note that at this point the players are again in the original 1-3-1 formation, except flipped to the other side.

During the time the other players are making the play, the fifth player on the other wing, now having received the ball from the player at the top, needs to watch if any good shot opportunity occurs and make appropriate passes. The first cutter will get the ball for an easy layup down the basket, if open. The second cutter will get the ball for a quick catch and shoot at the free throw line, if open. If the first two cuts are unsuccessful, the third cutter will receive the ball and drive down the lane for a layup, if possible. Even if there is no good opportunity during the whole play, the players are now again in the 1-3-1 formation, and are ready to initiate another wave of offense.

== Advantages of using the wheel offense ==
The wheel offense is very advantageous to use. First it is very flexible and easy to set up. All the positions in the wheel offense are interchangeable (i.e. the point guard doesn't have to be the first cutter).This enables the ball-handler to start the wheel offense from either wing without the other players changing their positions. With its flexibility, the wheel offense blends well with both half-court attack and fast break.

Once the play is set up, the wheel offense can work effectively against both man-to-man defense and zone defense. The various cuts and double screens will create open shot opportunities if the defense fails to react quickly. Even if the defensive players manage to cover all the cutting offensive players, they are forced to switch match-ups. Switching match-ups often causes mismatches between offensive players and defensive players, and when mismatch happens, the offensive team often take advantage of it to score. Also, when a team runs the wheel offense, their game tempo will be very hard to disrupt.

The wheel offense can also integrate other offensive plays. Pinholster's Oglethorpe team would often run some concealment plays before they start the wheel offense. This made the wheel offense very hard to detect, and they could catch the defense off guard. During the play, when the wheel offense is in the 1-3-1 formation, it can also switch to other plays based on the same formation. This greatly increases the variation of the wheel offense, making it very hard to defend.

Moreover, the wheel offense is very helpful for team-building. Because the wheel offense demands every player to have good ball-handling and shooting skills, each player is forced to develop more fully. In the wheel offensive play, five players play as a team rather than individuals. Thus practicing and running the wheel offense is very helpful for developing a team spirit among the players.

== Requirements for using the wheel offense ==
There are a few conditions need to be satisfied before using the wheel offense. Some are listed below.

- The wheel offense works better for a balanced team than a team that relies on one or two superstars.
- To run the wheel offense, the team has to have good ball-handling skills. The first cutter needs to use good timing, speed and ingenuity. The second cutter needs to be good at shooting.
- The big men on the team have to move, though not necessarily fast, to set screens for the cutting players.
