= Box-and-one defense =

Defensive strategy in basketball

Box-and-one defense is a type of defense used in basketball. The box-and-one defense is a hybrid between a man-to-man defense (in which each defensive player is responsible for marking a player on the other team) and a zone defense (in which each defensive player is responsible for guarding an area of the court).

== Description ==
In a box-and-one defense, four players play zone defense, and align themselves in a box protecting the basket, typically with the two larger (or frontcourt) players playing directly under the basket, and the two smaller (or backcourt) players playing towards the foul line. The fifth defensive player in a box-and-one defense plays man-to-man defense, usually marking the best offensive player on the other team.

A box-and-one defense is generally used against teams with one dominant scoring threat. The idea is to try to shut that player down by forcing them to score against a dedicated man-to-man player, and a supporting zone. Players like Allen Iverson and Ray Allen often faced box-and-one defensive schemes while competing for Georgetown University and the University of Connecticut, respectively.

One variation is the "diamond-and-one defense", where the four players in the box are arranged in a diamond pattern (one under the basket, two between the basket and foul line, and the fourth at the foul line). Another variation is the triangle-and-two defense, in which three defenders play zone defense while the remaining two play man-to-man defense.

== In the NBA ==
The biggest weakness of a box-and-one defense is its vulnerability to a pass to the middle of the "box". As there is no defensive player responsible for this area of the court, offensive teams are able to exploit the gap. A pass to the middle of the box or to the top of the box will generally yield a short-range shot from inside the key. It can also “collapse” the box, causing the four zone defenders to fall inside the key and, upon a second pass, yielding a wide open and uncontested look from the perimeter. It is for this reason that the box-and-one defense is not often seen in professional leagues.

The defense was notably used in the 2019 NBA Finals between the Toronto Raptors and Golden State Warriors. The Raptors utilized a box-and-one defense with reserve shooting guard Fred VanVleet late in Game 2 in order to shut down Steph Curry as he was the lone offensive scoring threat once Klay Thompson left with an injury and Kevin Durant was ruled out. This tactic prevented the Golden State Warriors from scoring for over five minutes. The Raptors were narrowly defeated despite having given up an 18–0 run at the start of the third quarter. In Game 4, the Raptors again employed the same defense in a 105–92 win to take a 3–1 series lead. After Thompson was injured in Game 6, the Raptors again employed the box-and-one with VanVleet against Curry and won the game to win the championship.

The Raptors once again used this defense in the 2020 NBA Playoffs during the Eastern Conference semifinals against the Boston Celtics. Throughout the series, the Raptors employed the defense against Jayson Tatum in Game 4 and Kemba Walker in Game 6, winning both games. The box-and-one was used again in Game 7, but the Raptors ultimately lost the deciding game.

== In lacrosse ==
This strategy is also used in a man down situation in lacrosse. When a team has a penalty and is down a man, the team will send out a Long Stick Midfielder to add to the three Long Stick defensemen. There is also one short stick midfielder. The Long Sticks make a tight box in front of the goal with the short stick on the crease. The four long sticks will play zone defense, with the closest man to the ball playing man to man, and the furthest splitting two offensemen. Every time the ball is passed, the formation rotates to the next man. The short stick will play man to man if there is an attackman on the crease, otherwise he will join the rotation.

== In ultimate ==
This strategy is also used in the sport of ultimate, which relies on defenses sometimes similar to basketball in its mixture of man and zone formats. In ultimate, the box-and-one defense is usually incorporated into a defensive strategy called the "cup", where three other players play a zone around the player in possession of the disc. If the boxed player is a handler (similar to a point guard in basketball) in possession of the disc, the cup will include the boxed player temporarily in their zone.

== See also ==
- Basketball positions
- Man-to-man defense
- Match-up zone defense
- Triangle-and-two defense
- Zone defense
