= Illegal defense =

Illegal defense or illegality defence may refer to:

- Illegality defence (Ex turpi causa non oritur actio), a legal doctrine
- Defensive three-second violation or illegal defense, in basketball

== See also ==
- Legal defence
- Offside (association football)
