= Triangle-and-two defense =

Defence in basketball

The triangle-and-two defense is a particular type of defense used in basketball.

The triangle-and-two defense is a hybrid between a man-to-man defense in which each defensive player is responsible for marking a player on the other team, and a zone defense in which each defensive player is responsible for guarding an area of the court.

In a triangle-and-two defense, three players play zone defense, and align themselves in a triangle protecting the basket, with typically the power forward and center playing directly under the basket, and the small forward playing towards the foul line.

The shooting guard and point guard in a triangle-and-two defense play man-to-man defense, typically marking the opposing team's best offensive players on the perimeter.

A triangle-and-two defense is usually used against teams with a dominant scoring backcourt. It is also often used simply to disrupt the play of the opposing guards, who are generally the best passers on the floor, thus disrupting the entire offense. The idea is to try to shut perimeter players down by forcing them to score against a dedicated man-to-man player, and a supporting zone. The set was often used against the dynamic backcourt of Jameer Nelson and Delonte West of Saint Joseph's University in 2004. One specific example of a team effectively employing the strategy en route to victory was in 1998 when the Utah Utes, led by head coach Rick Majerus and point guard Andre Miller, defeated the #1 seed and defending national champions Arizona Wildcats in the Elite 8 round. Utah successfully neutralized Arizona's two star guards, Miles Simon and Mike Bibby, winning the game by a score of 76-51 and earning a trip to the Final Four. In the 2010 NCAA Tournament, Sam Houston State employed the Triangle-and-Two defense against heavily favored Baylor, neutralizing Baylor threats Ekpe Udoh and Tweety Carter. Sam Houston State was able to keep the game close the entire way before falling in the game's final minute. The set was used by the Kansas Jayhawks against Harrison Barnes and Reggie Bullock of the North Carolina Tar Heels in the 2012 NCAA Tournament Midwest Regional final. This resulted in North Carolina failing to hit a shot from the field for the final 5:48 of the game, and a failure to score at all for the final 3:58.

The biggest weakness of a triangle-and-two defense is its vulnerability to cutters through the lane, and also against good passing from the forward spots. Teams with good passers on the floor are often able to easily find flaws in this defense.

One variation of the triangle-and-two defense is the diamond-and-one defense, where the four players in the box are arranged in a diamond pattern (one under the basket, two between the basket and foul line, and the fourth at the foul line). Another variation is the box-and-one defense, in which four defenders play zone defense in a box shape around the key, while the remaining defender plays man-to-man defense.
