= Double coverage =

Defensive strategy in gridiron football

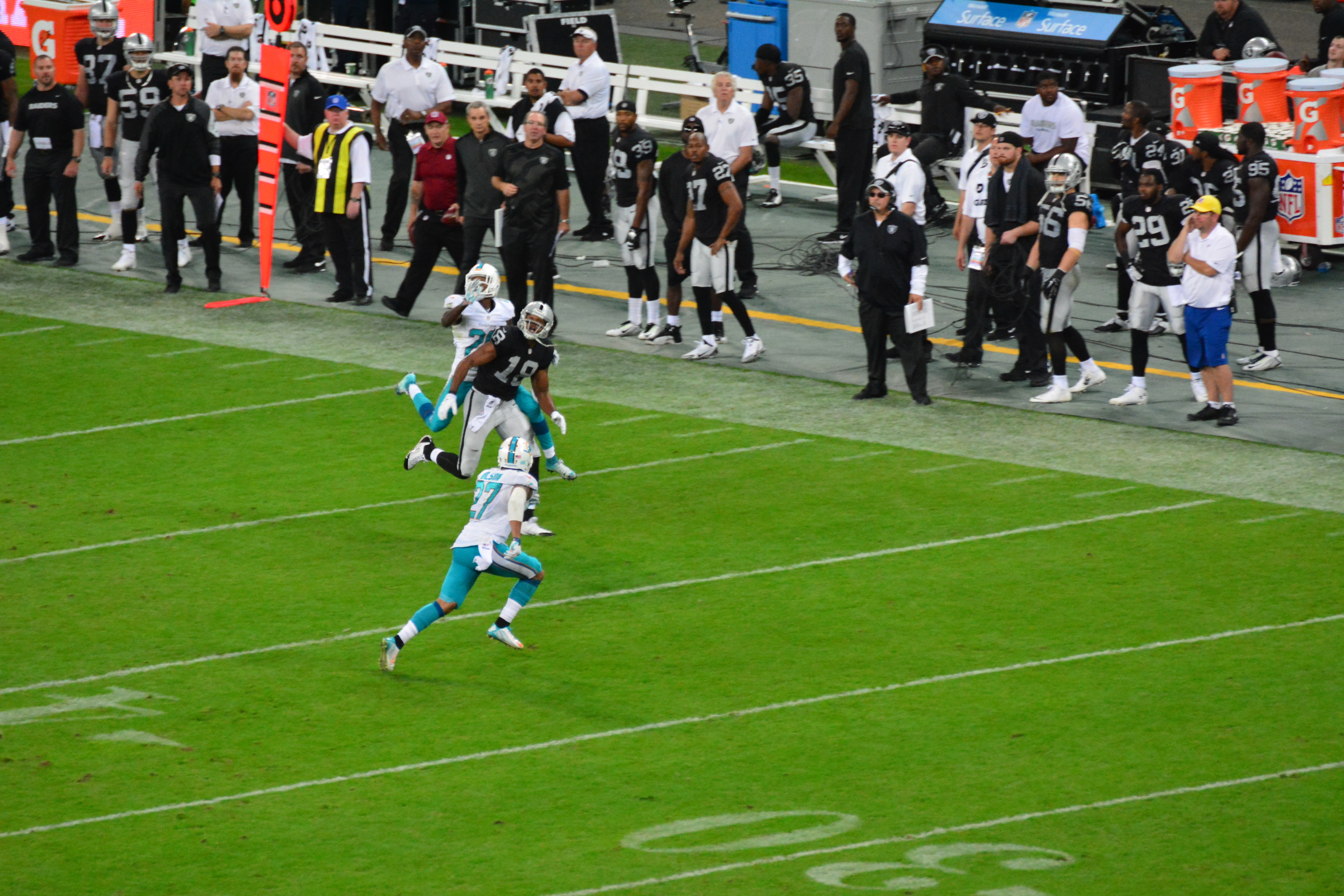
Two defensive backs on a Raiders receiver

In gridiron football, double coverage is a state of defensive playcalling where two defensive players are assigned to "cover" one offensive player. This situation is often seen with standout wide receivers and running backs.

It is extremely rare to have two defensive backs man-cover a single receiver. Commentators who use the term "double-coverage" almost always mean a cornerback covering a wide receiver man-to-man, with a safety playing "over the top" (typically trying to stay in front of the wide receiver's route) for deep ball assistance.

Although double coverage typically involves man-to-man coverage, it can occur in zone coverage as well. Because zone coverage schemes often use six or seven defensive backs to cover the offense's five eligible receivers, one or two of these men can drop underneath a wide receiver's route while a safety or cornerback stays over the top. This can occur in such coverages as Cover 2, Cover 3, and Cover 4.

== See also ==
- Double team, similar strategy in basketball
