= Motion offense =

Offensive strategy in basketball

A motion offense is a category of offensive scheme used in basketball. Motion offenses use player movement, often as a strategy to exploit the quickness of the offensive team or to neutralize a size advantage of the defense.

Motion offenses are different from continuity offenses in that they follow no fixed repeating pattern. Instead, a motion offense is free-flowing and relatively unrestricted, though following a set of rules. Some examples of basic rules that are commonly used are:

- Pass and screen away: Players pass to one side of the court and seek to screen for players on the opposite side of the court. The hope is to create spacing and driving lanes to the basket.
- Back screen: Players in the key seek to screen players on the wing and open them up for basket cuts.
- Flare screen: Player without the ball on the perimeter seeks to set a screen (usually near the elbow area of the lane) for another player without the ball at the top of the key area.

== Bob Knight's version ==
Bob Knight was influential in the development of the motion offense. He enjoyed success for over 40 years as the head coach of the United States Military Academy, Indiana University, and Texas Tech University, recording 902 total victories. Knight's motion offense did not truly come to fruition until his time at Indiana. Prior to that, as head coach of Army, he ran a "reverse action" offense. This offense involved reversing the ball from one side of the floor to the other, and screening along with it. According to Knight, it was a "West Coast offense" that Pete Newell used during his coaching career. After watching the Princeton offense for years while still at West Point, Knight went to the Olympic trials in 1972 to learn about the passing game. With Newell's help, he was able to further develop his offense.

Instead of relying on set plays, Knight's offense is designed to react to the defense. His motion emphasized post players setting screens and perimeter players passing the ball until a teammate becomes open for an uncontested lay-up or jump shot. Players are required to be unselfish and disciplined and must be effective in setting and using screens to get open.

Bob Knight won all three of his NCAA Championships as Indiana's head coach, in 1976, 1981, and 1987.

== See also ==
- Continuity offense
