= Match-up zone defense =

Defensive strategy in basketball

Match-up zone defense is a type of defense used in the game of basketball. It is commonly referred to as a "combination" defense, as it combines certain aspects of man-to-man defense and zone defense.

College head coaches Jim Boeheim and John Chaney were advocates of the match-up zone defense.

== Characteristics ==
With the match-up zone defense, the on-ball defender will play tight as if he was playing man-to-man. At the same time, the zone away from the ball will resemble "help-side" man-to-man defense. This creates one of the advantages for the match-up zone, as it may confuse the opponent as to what defense you are actually playing. The match-up zone also resembles a "switching man-to-man" defense, where the big men stay down low in the post and the guards stay around the perimeter. When asked to describe Chaney's match-up zone, Saint Joseph's Hawks coach Phil Martelli replied: "In college basketball, there's the Pete Carril Princeton offense, the John Chaney Match up Zone defense, then everything else. Those are the only two truly unique syles designed and being used today."

One benefit of employing the match-up defense is its potential to befuddle the opposing team as they attempt to discern the defensive strategy. Additionally, it has the capability to disrupt the offense's customary setup, pushing them out of their comfort zone. Through the match-up approach, you have the flexibility to present a 2-1-2 formation, potentially prompting the offense to adopt a 1-3-1 or a 3-out, 2-in configuration.
