= Continuity offense =

Offensive strategy in basketball

A continuity offense is one of two main categories of basketball offenses, the other being motion offense. Continuity offenses are characterized by a pattern of movement, cuts, screens and passes which eventually leads back to the starting formation. At this point the pattern of movement is repeated, hence the name continuity offense. The best-known continuity offenses are the shuffle offense, flex offense, wheel offense and John Wooden's UCLA High Post Offense.

== See also ==
- Motion offense
