= Double team =

Defensive strategy in basketball

In basketball, a double team (also double-team, double teaming, or double-teaming) is a defensive alignment in which two defensive players are assigned to guard a single offensive player.

Kobe Bryant goes up for a shot against the Phoenix Suns double team, May 2010

Among basketball strategies in which defenders are assigned to specific players (as opposed to "zone defenses" in which they are assigned to specific regions of the court), each defender is assigned to one offensive player (a "man-to-man" alignment). However, when an offensive player is overwhelming their defender, another defender may help out and create a double team. A successful double teaming can greatly impede that offensive player's movement and passing, such that passing him or her the ball frequently results in a turnover. However, because devoting two defenders to a single offensive player leaves another offensive player unguarded, if the offensive player succeeds in both receiving the ball and passing it to that teammate, the teammate's likelihood of making a shot becomes much higher than usual.

Double teaming is employed more frequently near the basket than away from it because a) offensive players' likelihood of making any given shot is greater and b) because players tend to congregate near the basket when the ball is in play there, a double-teaming defender can more easily break away if necessary (e.g., to recover a rebound or to block a shot from another player). One common offensive strategy is to have a tall, physically imposing player (usually a center) "post up" to force a double team, such that he can then either shoot or pass to the unguarded player (often a strong long-distance ["outside"] shooter attempting to make a three-point shot). A defending team may also double-team a good offensive player away from the basket simply to interfere with the offensive team's preferred tactics. In the NBA, players such as Michael Jordan and Stephen Curry have been double-teamed and triple-teamed on a regular basis due to their offensive prowess and scoring ability. Stan Albeck, a basketball historian and coach, said that the technique originated in the 1980s around the time Jordan was competing in the NBA.

== Gallery ==
Simeon Career Academy vs. Whitney Young High School at the Jones Convocation Center on January 26, 2013
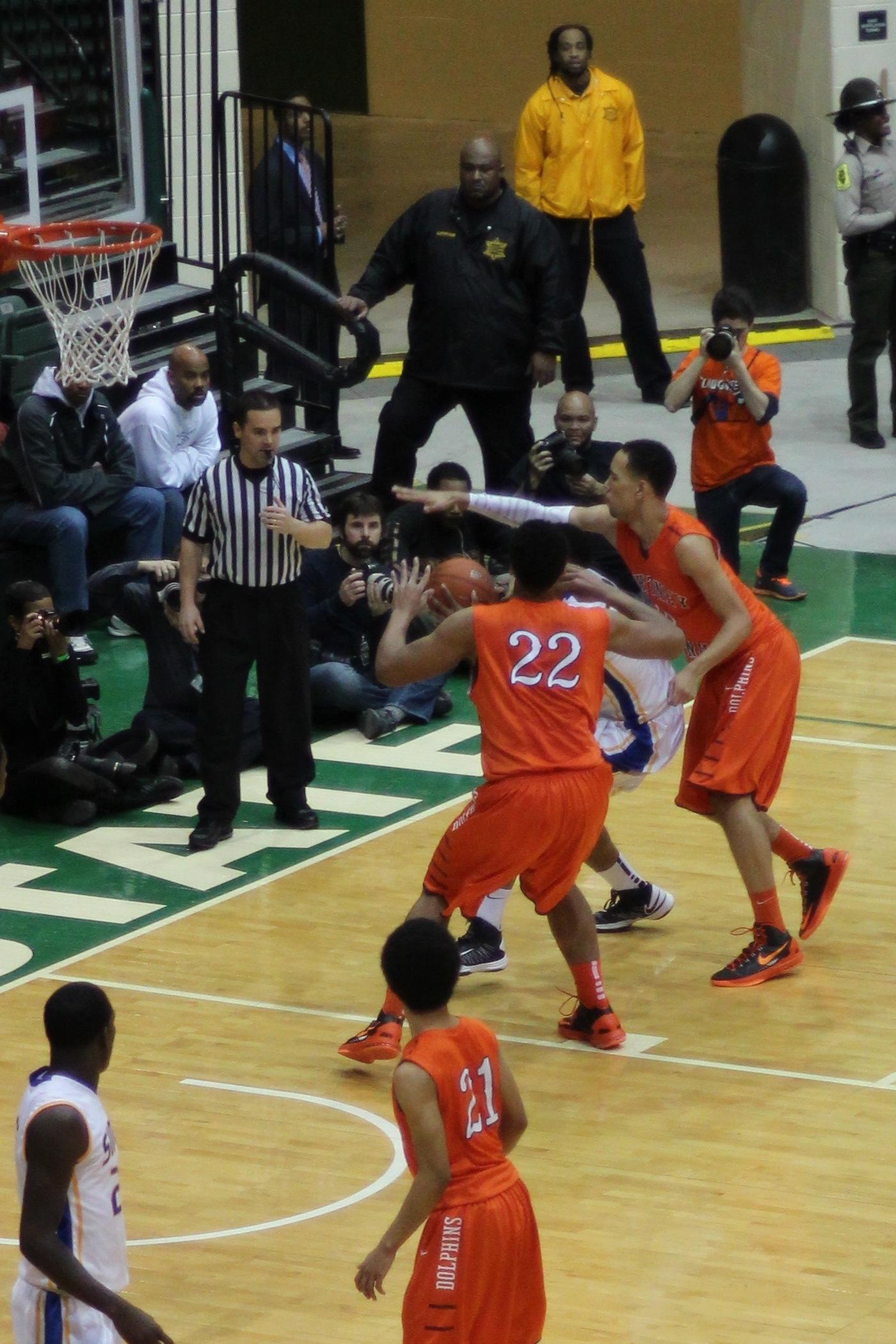
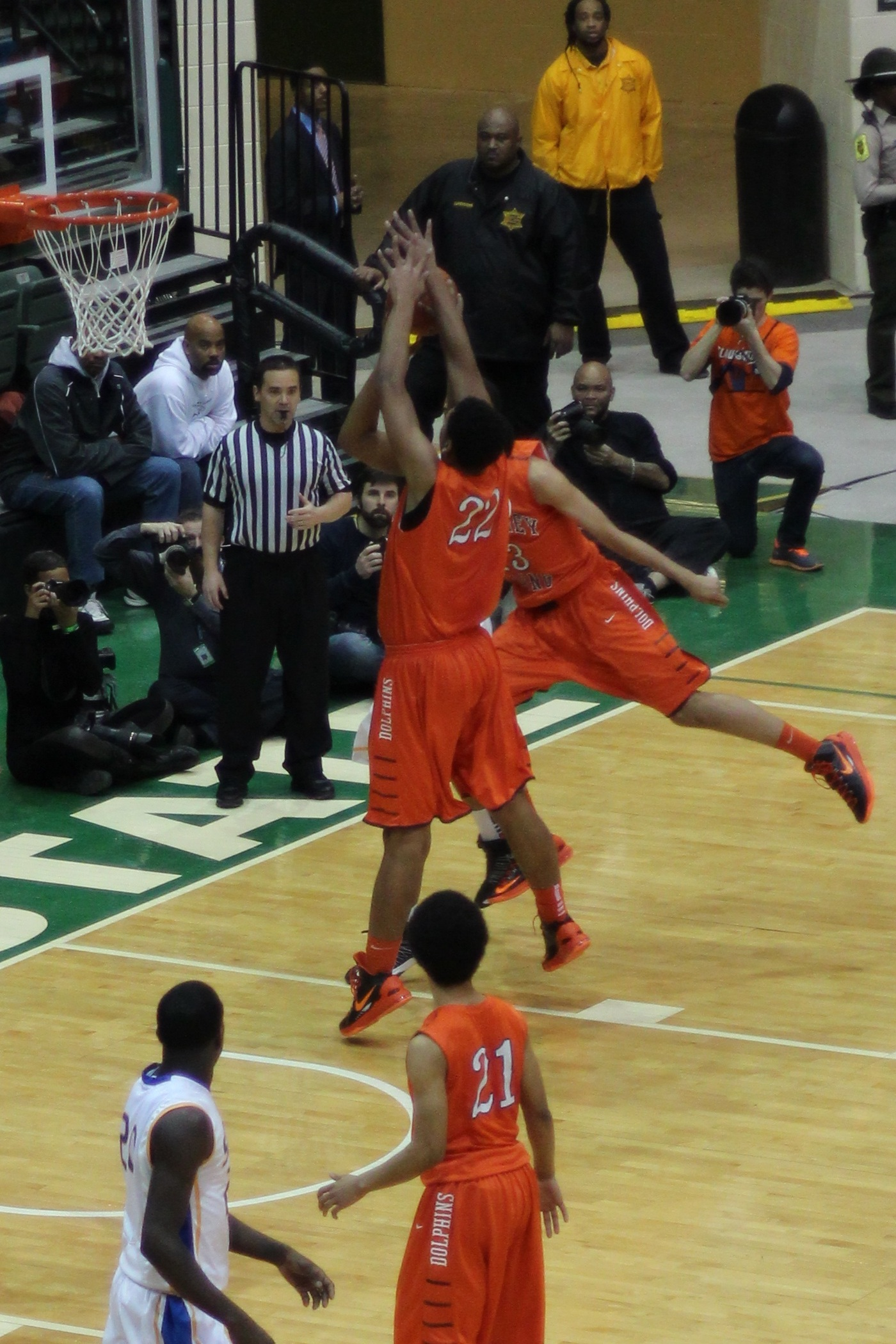
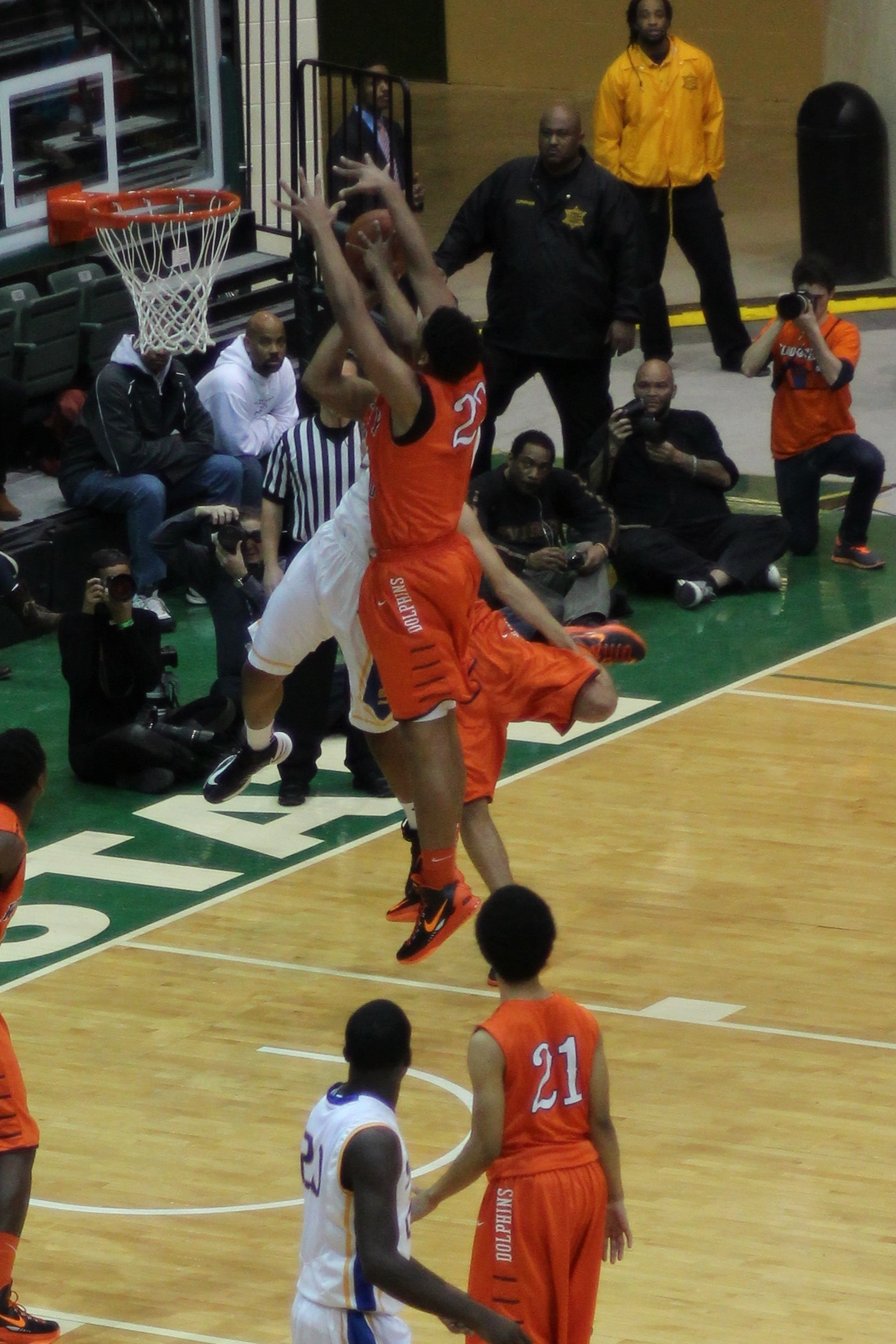
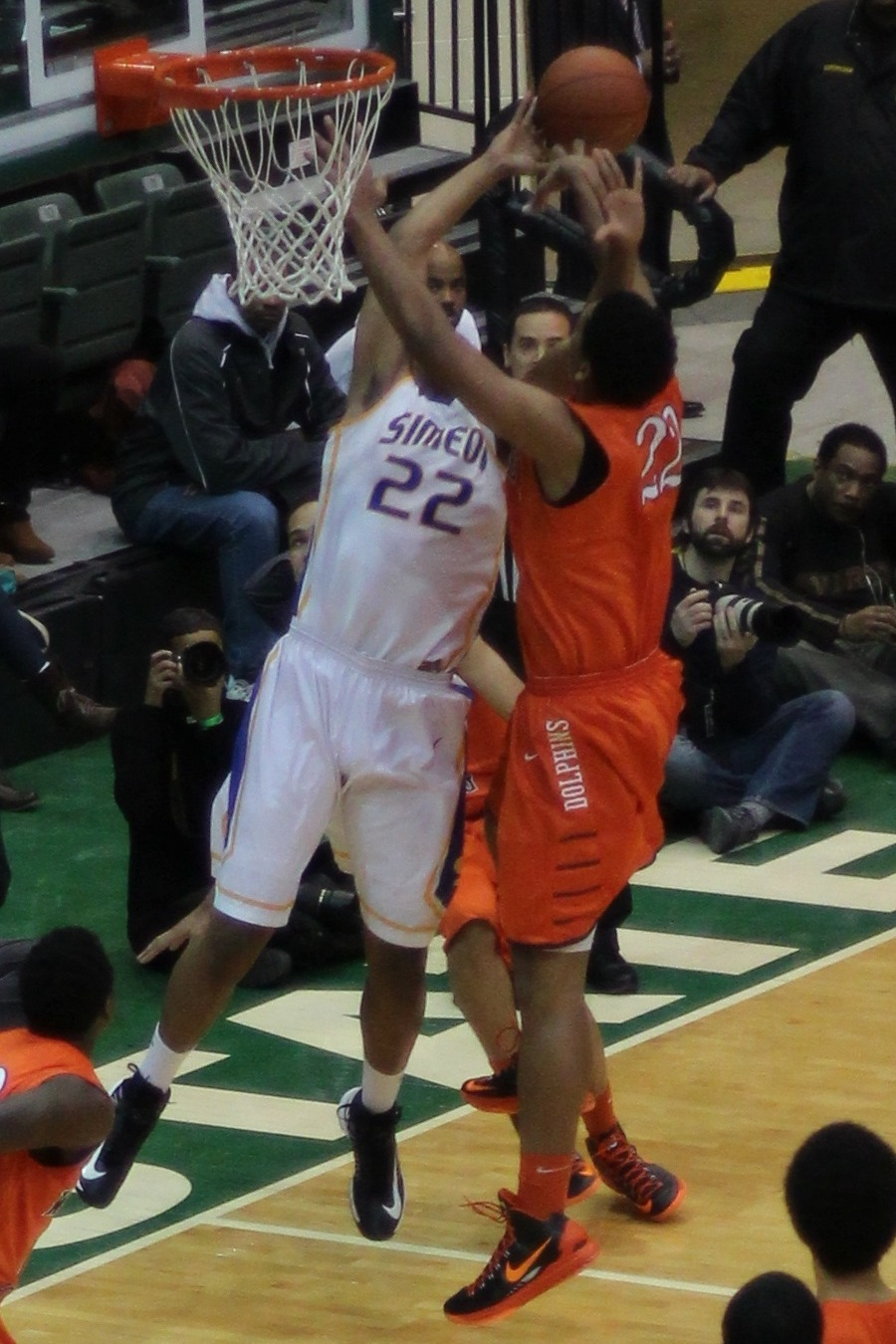
Jahlil Okafor (#22 orange) provides help defense to double team Jabari Parker (#22 white) with Paul White (#13 orange), resulting in a blocked shot for Okafor.

== See also ==
- Double coverage, similar strategy in gridiron football
