= Flex offense =

Strategy in basketball

The Flex offense is an offensive strategy in basketball invented in 1967 by Rene Herrerias while coaching at Cal-Berkeley. It was utilized to bring UCLA's star center, Lew Alcindor (later known as Kareem Abdul-Jabbar), away from the basketball. The offense was originally called the "Cha Cha". It is a patterned offense relying on cuts across the key (called a "flex cut") and down screens to create a "pick-the-picker" action. This offense is most effective against a man-to-man defense, though some ambitious coaches have used it against odd front zones. It is the favored offense of many high school programs because it requires players to be in constant motion and the patterns of screens and cuts are easy to remember. Though dismissed by many coaches at the college level for its predictability, some notable programs still rely on it. It has been run by many NCAA teams, including by Gary Williams of the University of Maryland. Williams used the flex offense to lead the Terrapins to the 2002 NCAA National Championship. Also, Gordie James of Willamette University used the flex offense to lead the Bearcats to the 1993 NAIA Division II National Championship. Additionally, Jerry Sloan ran his variation of it for years with the Utah Jazz.

The flex is a type of continuity offense, similar to (and in fact derived from) the earlier shuffle offense.

The basic theory behind the flex offense is that all players are interchangeable—no player has a traditional role. The point guard advances the ball up the court to start the offense, while other players set screens to create openings. Typically, the point guard sets the offense on the same side as a low-post player positioned at the right block. The point guard passes opposite to a high-post at the top of the key while a wing player cuts off a screen by the low post player towards the ball to receive a pass from the high post player. The point guard screens down to the low post player who moves to the top of the key to receive a pass from the high post player. The same cut occurs on the other side of the ball and the offense begins its continuous cycle.

== Variations ==
Gonzaga University runs a modified version of the simplistic flex offense. The University of Maryland ran a modified version of the flex offense under previous head coach Gary Williams. Maryland's prior offense attempted to run a version of the flex offense that allowed for closer shots at the basket, and was less focused on obtaining open perimeter jump shots. Boston College under Coach Al Skinner also ran the flex; the BC version was very compact, creating an extremely physical game and limiting a team's ability to help because of how collapsed the floor is.

Variations of the flex include the 5 man flex, utilizing all 5 players in the cutting and screening action and the 4 man flex, which utilizes 4 players. Since this offense is classified as a continuity offense, in which players repeat specific actions, some teams will build in options within the offense to keep defenses from anticipating a particular cut or screen.
