= Jump ball =

Basketball term

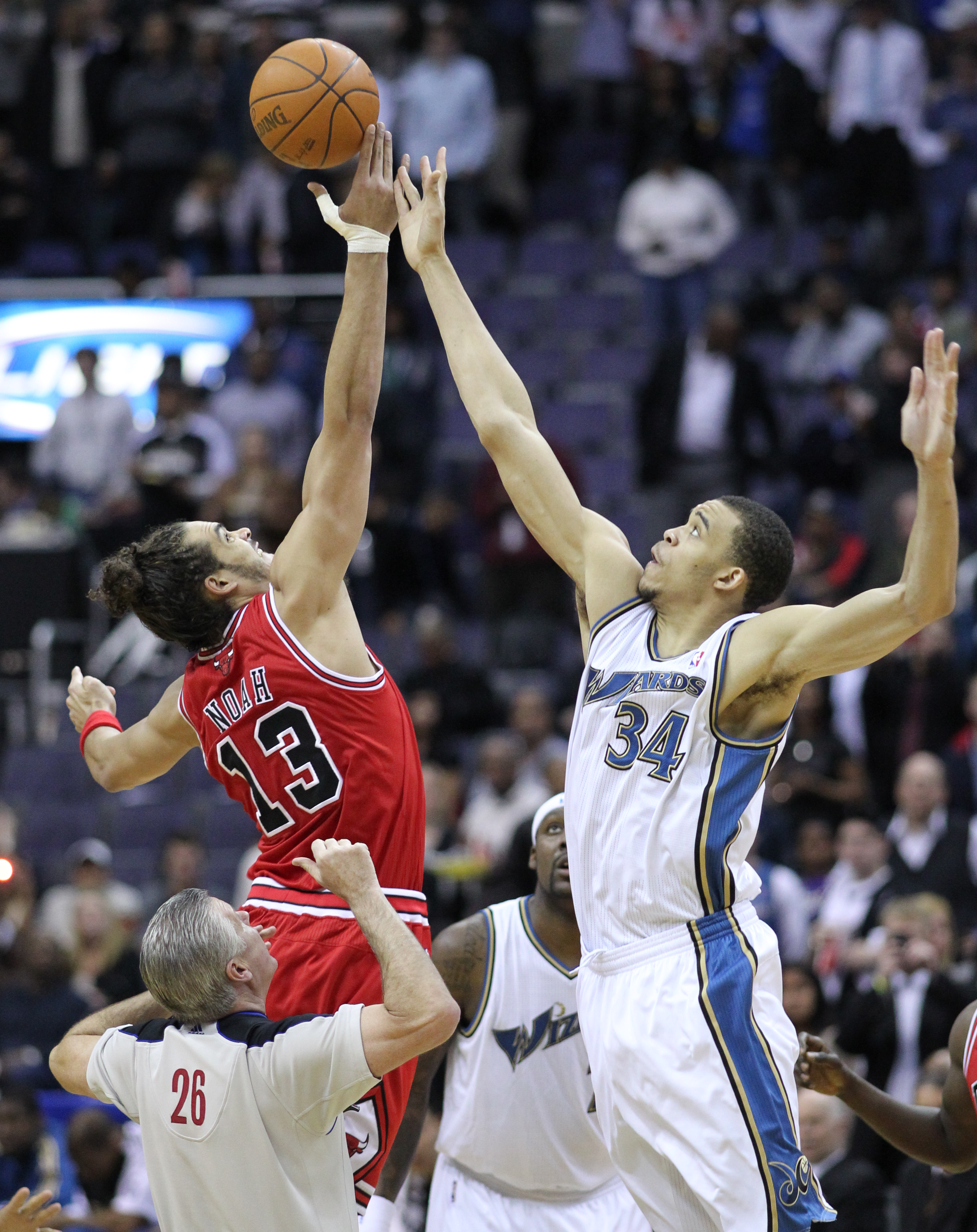
Joakim Noah (13) and JaVale McGee (34) compete at center court for the jump ball that starts the game, which is known as the tip-off or opening tip.

A jump ball is a method used to begin or resume play in basketball. It is similar to a face-off in ice hockey and field lacrosse and a ball-up in Australian rules football. Two opposing players attempt to gain control of the ball after an official tosses it into the air between them.

Originally, jump balls were used to restart play at the beginning of every quarter and after each basket scored. The NBA and NCAA dropped jump balls after baskets in the mid-20th century. The NBA stopped using jump balls for 2nd-4th quarter possession in 1975, and the NCAA implemented alternating possession rules in 1981 that award possession sequentially for all jump ball situations after the opening tip at the beginning of the game. The WNBA and Euroleague Basketball have adopted the NBA's jump ball rules, while other leagues have implemented alternating possession. 3x3 basketball does not use jump balls at all.

The rules for jump balls are relatively relaxed, with penalties rarely called on players touching the ball before it has reached the peak of its throw. Jump ball throw styles vary, and may feature misdirection to catch players off guard.

== Usage ==
In the NBA, WNBA, and competitions operated by Euroleague Basketball, a jump ball occurs at the start of the game (called the opening tip or opening tip-off), the start of any extra period (tip-off), to settle special situations where penalties cancel out and neither team is previously entitled to the ball, and to settle any held balls. Held balls occur when two opposing players both lay equal claim to the ball, and after trying to wrestle it from each other, end up in a stalemate. A jump ball may also be called if there are different calls by two or more referees. Although rare, a jump ball occurs when the ball becomes wedged between the goal and backboard.

However, most competitions other than the NBA, WNBA, and Euroleague Basketball use the alternating possession rule to settle all jump ball situations after the opening tip. This uses a possession arrow on the scorekeeper's table. Whenever such a jump ball situation occurs, possession of the ball is awarded to the team that is moving in the direction of the possession arrow on offense. The arrow then swaps to point to the other team. At the start of the game, the arrow points to the team that loses the opening tip.

== History ==
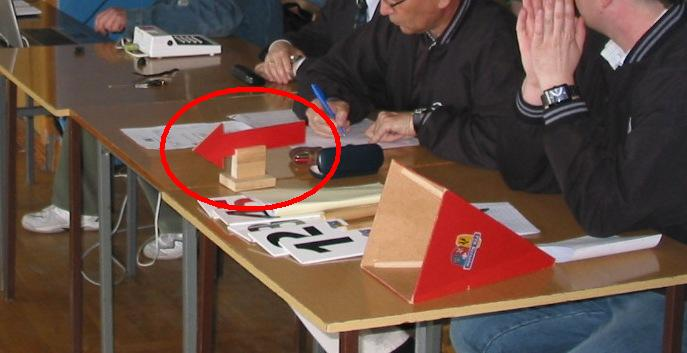
Possession arrow in Poland (circled)

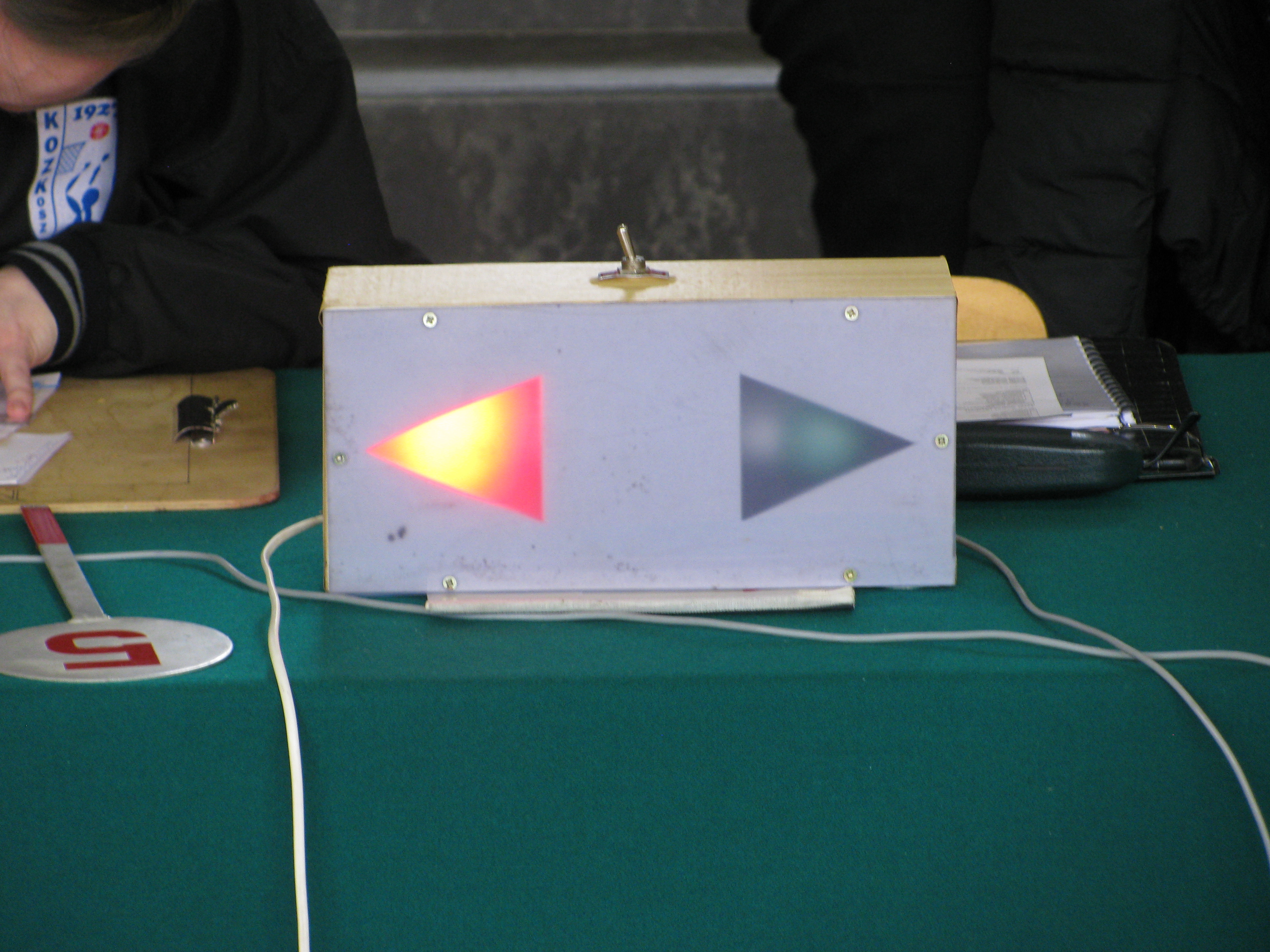
Electric possession arrow in Wadowice, Poland

Possession arrows

James Naismith's original rules for basketball included a jump ball to begin every quarter, and after every basket scored. The NCAA first changed these rules in 1937, awarding possession after baskets to the scored-upon team. The NBA mirrored the NCAA's jump ball rules in 1949, and add a further change in 1975, removing jump balls to begin the second, third and fourth quarters, automatically granting possession in the second and third quarters to the team losing the opening tip, and possession in the fourth to the team that won the first tip.

The alternating possession arrow rule went into effect in men's college basketball beginning with the 1981-82 season, and the women's game followed suit in 1986-87. League executives adopted the rule based on the belief that referees were not able to consistently ensure fair tosses, citing examples of games whose outcomes were effectively sealed by an inadequate toss. The decision has been controversial. Advocates of alternating possession argue that it is more fair, but this is disputed by its opponents, who also argue that jump balls are a vital part of the sport.

FIBA, with recommendation by NCAA Men's Supervisor of Officials Hank Nichols, on the FIBA World Technical Commission at the time, adopted the alternating possession rule in 2003, with a major difference. In overtime periods, play begins with the arrow. In other organizations, another jump ball is conducted.

FIBA mandated that ULEB, which operated the EuroLeague and Eurocup before handing responsibility to the Euroleague Company, adopt the FIBA rule in 2005, as part of FIBA's rules being used by the EuroLeague, effective the 2005-06 season. Previously, the EuroLeague used the NBA jump ball rules. However, the Euroleague Company reinstated the jump ball rule in 2013.

Uniquely, 3x3, a formalized version of halfcourt three-on-three basketball overseen by FIBA, does not use a jump ball at any time in a game. Under current (2016) rules, the first possession is based on the result of a pregame coin toss; the winner can choose to have the first possession either at the start of the game or at the start of a potential overtime. During the game, held balls are automatically awarded to the defensive team.

== Technique ==
Jump balls are a relatively unregulated part of basketball. In the NBA, players are technically supposed to touch the ball only after it has reached the top of its flight arc, but slight breaking of this rule––known as "stealing the toss"––is commonplace, tolerated, and arguably expected of players. There are no league-wide standards regulating how referees are to throw the ball beyond the stipulation that the ball should reach its top altitude squarely between the two players competing for it. In order to curb stealing, referees incorporate misdirection into their throwing styles to catch players off guard and unable to preempt the toss. Consequently, while height is obviously helpful for players competing for jump balls, top jump ball scorers are primarily credited for their agility and ability to time both the throw and their opponent.

The leniency in penalizing jump ball stealing is in part due to its position in the game: referees are reluctant to stop play immediately after it starts, and game-opening jump balls lend minimal advantage because the losing team will be granted possession in the second quarter and to start the second half. An NBA study on jump balls found that in the 2022-2023 season, only 0.3% of jump balls had violations called.

Jump ball throwing styles are varied, including one-handed, two-handed, underhanded, and overhanded styles. While the ball's trajectory is typically delivered at a near vertical angle, this is not required. Ken Mauer was particularly noted for his unusual, off-center throwing style, described as "[taking] multiple steps back, then toss[ing the ball] at an angle with a surprise motion that almost made him look like a volleyball player setting the ball for a teammate". More generally, throw styles that incorporate stepping away from the ball's destination, known as "pulling", are employed by referees as a way to mitigate the risk of being injured by players competing for the toss.

== See also ==
- Rules of basketball
