= UCLA High Post Offense =

Offensive strategy in basketball

The UCLA High Post Offense is an offensive strategy in basketball, used by John Wooden, head coach at the University of California, Los Angeles. Due to UCLA's immense success under Wooden's guidance, the UCLA High Post Offense has become one of the most popular offensive tactics, and elements of it are commonly used on all levels of basketball including the NBA. When preparing for Lew Alcindor's varsity debut, Wooden sought the advice of Press Maravich, then coach of NC State, on the efficacy of the high-low post offense—a system Wooden had not previously utilized. Maravich gave the high-low post offense his wholehearted endorsement, which helped shape the UCLA High Post Offense.

The UCLA High Post Offense is flexible in its ability to use the strengths of most players on the floor. This man-to-man offense is designed to take full advantage of a center with good passing, shooting and one-on-one skills out of the high post, but it can also take advantage of the post up abilities of either guard and forward. It is commonly run out of the 2-2-1, 4-out/1-in set (also known as a two-guard front), but can also be initiated out of a 1-4 set with a variety of entries. The two-guard front keeps the pressure off a team's playmaker from having the ball in his hands all the time, as well as allowing the offense to be initiated from either side of the floor and giving either guard an opportunity to run the side-post game.

The UCLA High Post offense can be run to both sides of the court, and has a variety of options or "reads". It is a near relative of Tex Winter's triangle offense, featuring a three-man triangle game on the strong side and a two-man game on the weak side. Its strengths include simplicity, superb offensive rebounding coverage, a weak-side attack, consistent spacing, flexibility based on personnel and the ability to penetrate the defense. However, due to the presence of a strong-side high-low-wing triangle formation, the ability to penetrate with the dribble is highly limited.
