= Defensive three-second violation =

Basketball rules infraction in the NBA

A defensive three-second violation is a basketball rules infraction in the National Basketball Association (NBA), which was added prior to the 2001–2002 season in conjunction with the removal of previous illegal defense rules prohibiting zone defenses. It is assessed when a member of the defending team spends more than three seconds in the free throw lane (also called the key, the 16-foot lane, or "the paint") while not actively guarding an opponent. To be considered actively guarding an opponent, a defender must be within arm's length of an opponent and must be in a guarding position. A violation will not be called if an offensive player is in the act of shooting, if the offensive team loses control of the ball, if it is imminent that the defender's position will become legal, or if the defender is guarding a player who has possession of the ball.

The team committing a defensive three-second violation is assessed a team technical foul. The offense receives one free throw and retains possession of the ball.

The NBA also made zone defenses legal prior to the 2001–2002 season. The introduction of zone defenses faced resistance from players, including Michael Jordan. If teams were able to play zone defenses, he said, he never would have had the career he did. Other great players, such as Tim Duncan, Kevin Garnett, and Tracy McGrady have also confirmed that zone defenses made scoring more difficult compared to the 1990s NBA. The defensive three-second violation rule made it a little more difficult for teams to play zone, since such defenses usually position a player in the middle of the key to stop penetration, but teams adapted by teaching bigs to quickly exit and re-enter the paint, and by running schemes that legally reset the three-second timer. Scoring has increased substantially since the introduction of zone defense.

The WNBA adopted its own defensive three-second rule in 2013.

The rule is not used in the FIBA ruleset.

== See also ==
- Three seconds rule
- Five-second rule (basketball)
