= Key (basketball) =

Area on a basketball court

The different shapes of the key in different basketball disciplines (yellow, from left to right): NBA, NCAA, FIBA 1956–2010, and FIBA since 2010.

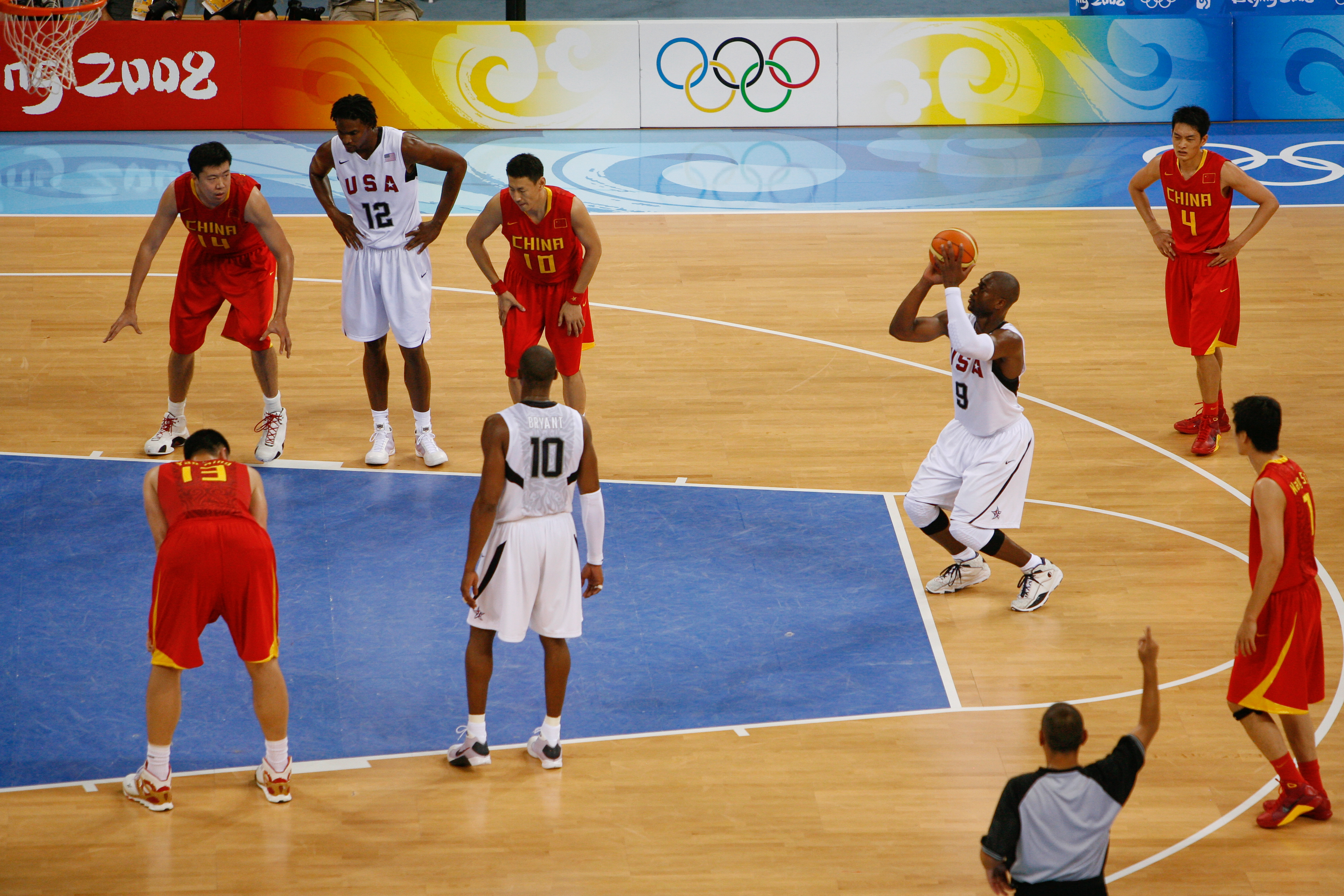
Top: 2008 Summer Olympics, prior to FIBA's adoption of the rectangular lane featuring the trapezoidal shaped key Bottom: 2024 Olympics, featuring the standard key implemented in 2010

The key is a marked area on a basketball court surrounding the basket, where much of the game's action takes place. The key is officially referred to as the free throw lane by the National Basketball Association (NBA), the EuroLeague, the National Collegiate Athletic Association (NCAA), the National Association of Intercollegiate Athletics (NAIA), and the National Federation of State High School Associations (NFHS). It is referred to as the restricted area by the International Basketball Federation (FIBA). The key is also simply called the lane.

The key consists of what is colloquially known as the circle and the post. The post, which overlaps with the bottom half of the circle, is also known as the lane or the paint. It can be considered a lane showing the path to the basket, and is usually painted in a distinctive color. The post is bounded by the baseline, the free-throw line, and two lane lines connecting free throw line and baseline.

Dimensions of the key area have varied through the history of the game. The lane used to be only 6 feet wide, better resembling the keyhole of a warded lock. In the NBA, the success near the basket of tall center George Mikan led to widening the lane to 12 feet, and similarly Wilt Chamberlain led to the widening of the lane to 16 feet. Since the 2010 FIBA rule amendments (approved in 2008 and implemented following the 2010 FIBA World Championship), its shape is rectangular for games sanctioned by all three associations, 16 feet (4.9 m) wide for both NBA and FIBA keys, and 12 feet (3.7 m) for NCAA and NAIA keys. Prior to those amendments, the key in FIBA-sanctioned tournaments had been a trapezoidal shape.

The most-commonly enforced rule on the key is the "three seconds rule" in which the team of a player on offense who stays on the key for more than three seconds loses possession of the ball. Another rule is the lane violation which occurs if a player from either team enters the key before a free-throw shooter releases the ball in the act of shooting, with the penalty of no basket if the shooter's team stepped over, and a penalty of a redo if the opposing team stepped over. A recent innovation is the introduction of the restricted area arc directly underneath the basket where the defending player cannot force an offensive foul on the opposing player.

== History ==
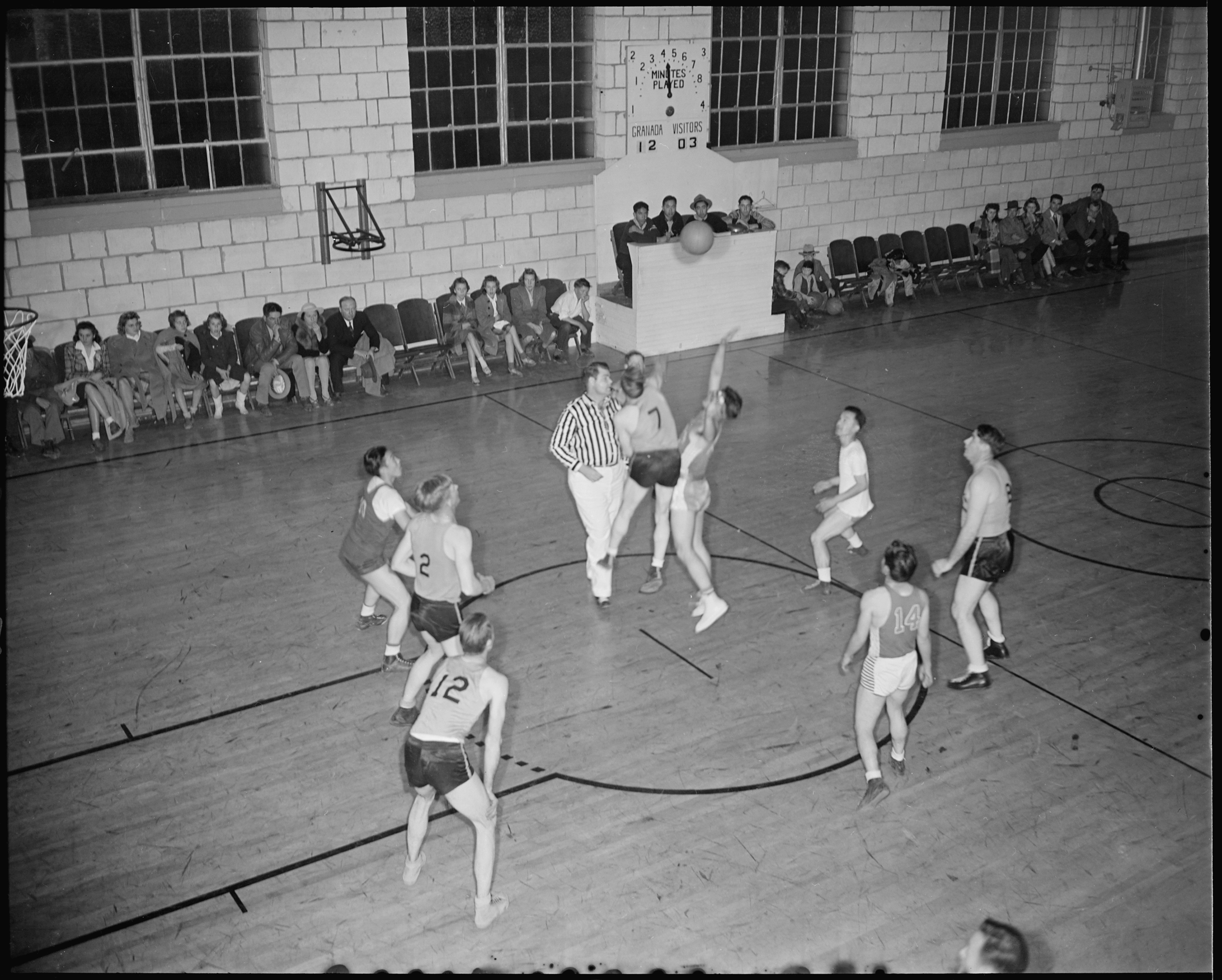
In this basketball game played in 1942, the key was much narrower than the free-throw circle.

Originally, the key was narrower and was shaped more like a keyhole, measuring six feet (1.8 m) wide, hence its name "the key", with the free-throw circle as the head, and the shaded lane as the body. It has been also called "cup" or "bottle" in other languages, because of how it looks from other perspectives. Due to the narrow key, imposing centers, such as George Mikan, dominated the paint, scoring at will. To counter this, the key was widened into 12 feet (3.7 m) from 6 feet (1.8 m) at the onset of the 1951–52 NBA season.

Men's professional basketball in the United States (the National Basketball Association) widened it further to 16 feet (4.9 m) in the 1964–65 NBA season to reduce the effectiveness of dominant centers, especially Wilt Chamberlain. The NCAA and NAIA retain the 12‑foot key to this day.

On April 25, 2008, the FIBA Central Board approved rule changes that included the shape of the key. It is now rectangular and has virtually the same dimensions as the key used in the NBA. In addition, the no-charge semicircle formally called the restricted area arc was also created. The change took effect in 2010.

== Dimensions ==
Each level of play has different specifications for the size and shape of the key: in American leagues, where the basketball court is measured in US units, the shape is rectangular, while in FIBA-sanctioned events, which use the metric system, the shape was trapezoidal before being changed to a rectangle as well. In addition to the bounding rectangle, the key includes a free-throw circle at its head or top.

The width of the key in the NBA is 16 feet (4.9 m); in U.S. college (NCAA, NAIA, etc.) and high school (NFHS) play, it is 12 feet (3.7 m).

Beginning after the 2010 FIBA World Championship, all FIBA-administered tournaments use a rectangular key 4.9 meters (16 ft) wide. From 1956 until 2010, FIBA-sanctioned tournaments used a trapezoidal key. The narrower end was on the free-throw line, where it was 3.6 meters (12 ft), while the wider end, at the end line, measured 6 meters (20 ft).

The free throw circle has a 6-foot (1.8 m) radius centered at the midpoint of the free throw line. The half-circle on the mid-court side of the free throw line is painted solid. In the NBA and Euroleague Basketball competitions, the boundary of the half closer to the basket is traced in a broken line in order to space players properly for jump balls. NBA Rule 1 (g) requires the key to contain two 6-inch (15 cm) long hash marks, 3 feet (0.91 m) from the free throw lane line; the marks indicate the so-called lower defensive box. The free throw line is 15 feet (4.6 m) from the perpendicular projection of the face of the backboard onto the court; this projection is 4 feet (1.2 m) from the end line for NBA, NCAA/NAIA, and NFHS. The projection of the center of the basket onto the court is a perpendicular distance of 1.575 meters (5.17 ft) from the end line in FIBA tournaments, but 5.25 feet (1.60 m) in NBA and NCAA or NAIA tournaments.

NBA and Euroleague (since 2019)	NCAA, NAIA, NFHS (U.S.)	FIBA (since 2010)	FIBA (until 2010)
An indoor arena filled with people watching a basketball game.	An indoor arena filled with people.	An indoor arena filled with people.	An indoor arena filled with people.
United Center, Chicago, U.S.	EagleBank Arena, Fairfax, U.S.	Palacio de Deportes José María Martín Carpena, Málaga, Spain	Menora Mivtachim Arena, Tel Aviv, Israel
NBA basketball courts have a 16-foot (4.9 m) rectangular key. Hash marks in an arc mark the portion of the circle for jump balls at the free throw line. Keys may have both NBA and NCAA or NAIA marking to allow use of the same floor by both organizations. Euroleague, which uses a 4.9-meter (16 ft) rectangular key, reinstated the NBA rule on jump balls in 2019.	NCAA, NAIA, and NFHS basketball courts have a 12-foot (3.7 m) wide key. The free throw lane has no hash marks because jump balls are not held at the free throw line.	Since 2010, all FIBA-specification courts have used 4.9-meter (16 ft) rectangular keys. Some competitions, however, use the NBA-specification key.	Prior to 2010, FIBA-specification courts had trapezoidal keys that were 6 meters (20 ft) at the baseline and 3.6 meters (12 ft) at the free throw line. The jump-ball circle was marked with solid lines on both sides of the free-throw line, the inside of which was often used for sponsor advertising.

== Rules ==
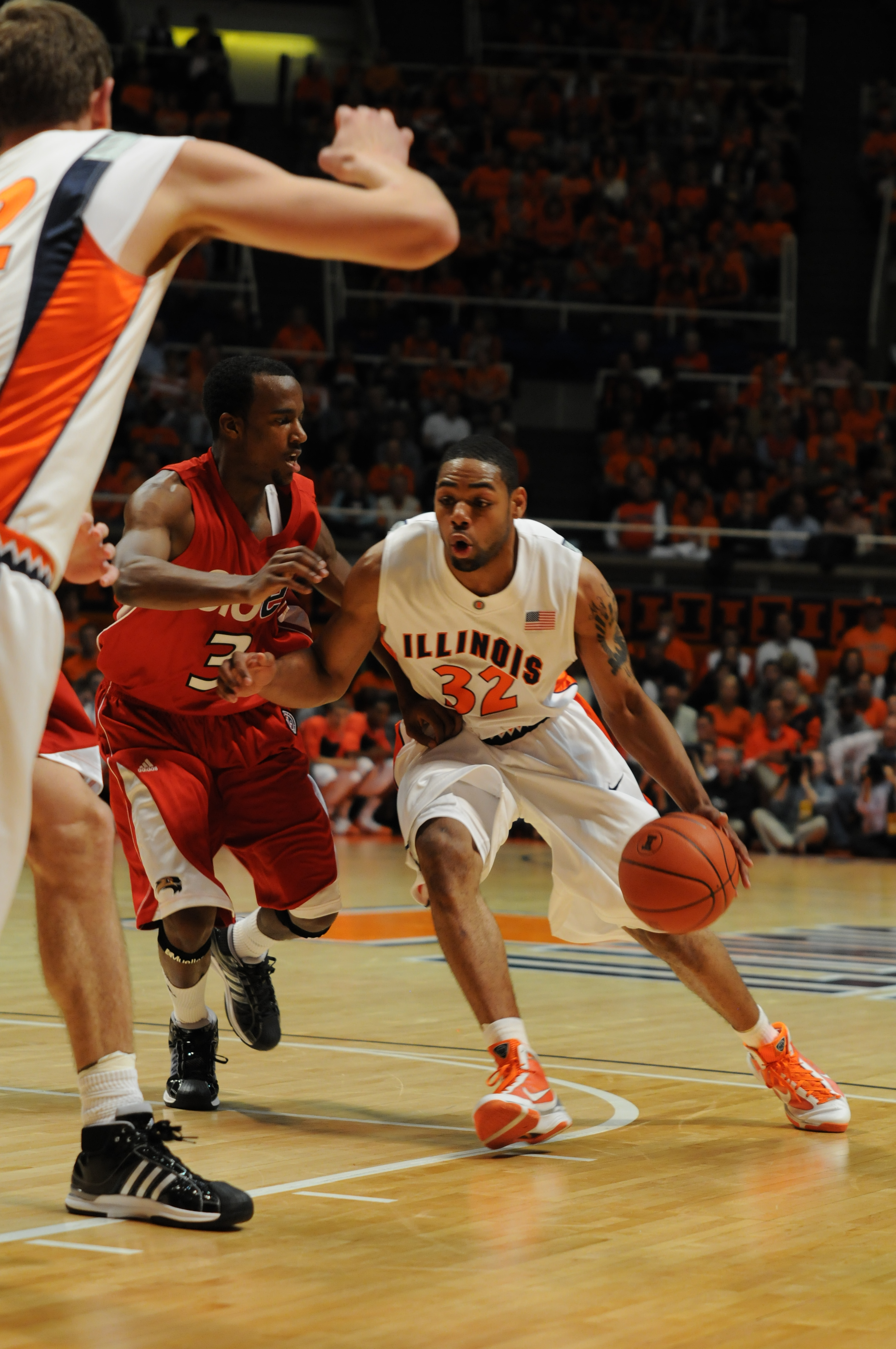
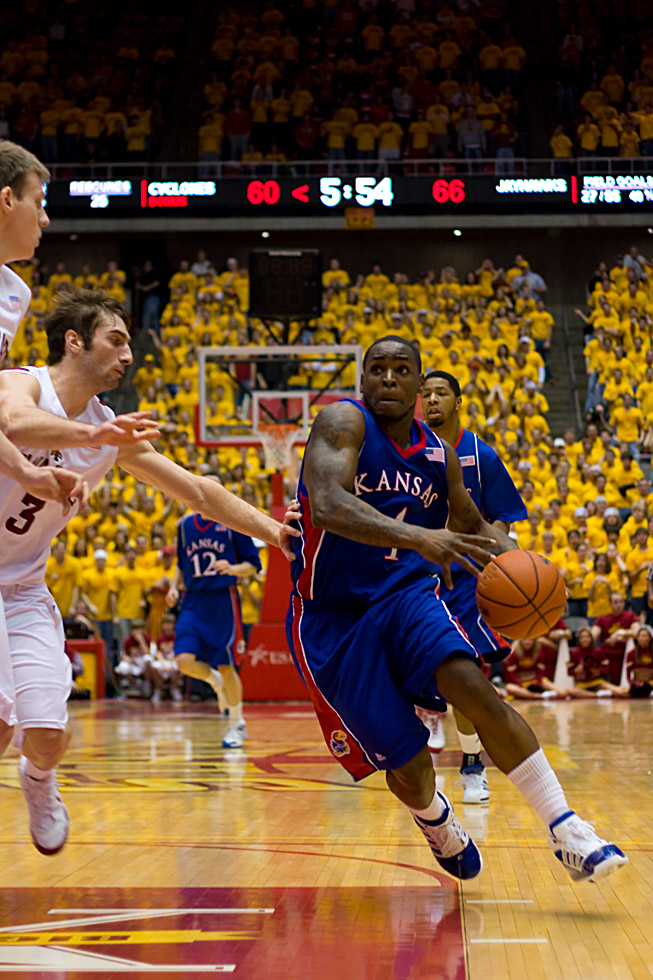
Demetri McCamey (left) and Sherron Collins (right) drive the key.

=== Three-second violation ===
The lane is a restricted area in which players on offense (in possession of the ball) can stay for only three seconds. At all levels of play, after three seconds the player is assessed a three-second violation which results in a turnover.

In FIBA-sanctioned tournaments, defending team players are allowed to stay in the key with no time limit. In American professional basketball, defending team players are prohibited from staying in the key for more than three seconds, unless the player is directly guarding an offensive player. Otherwise, if a defender exceeds that time, the defending team is charged with a defensive three-second violation, which results in a technical foul where the team with the ball is awarded one free throw, plus retaining possession and a reset of the shot clock. In all cases, the clock resets if the shot hits the rim or if the player steps out of the lane.

=== Lane violation ===
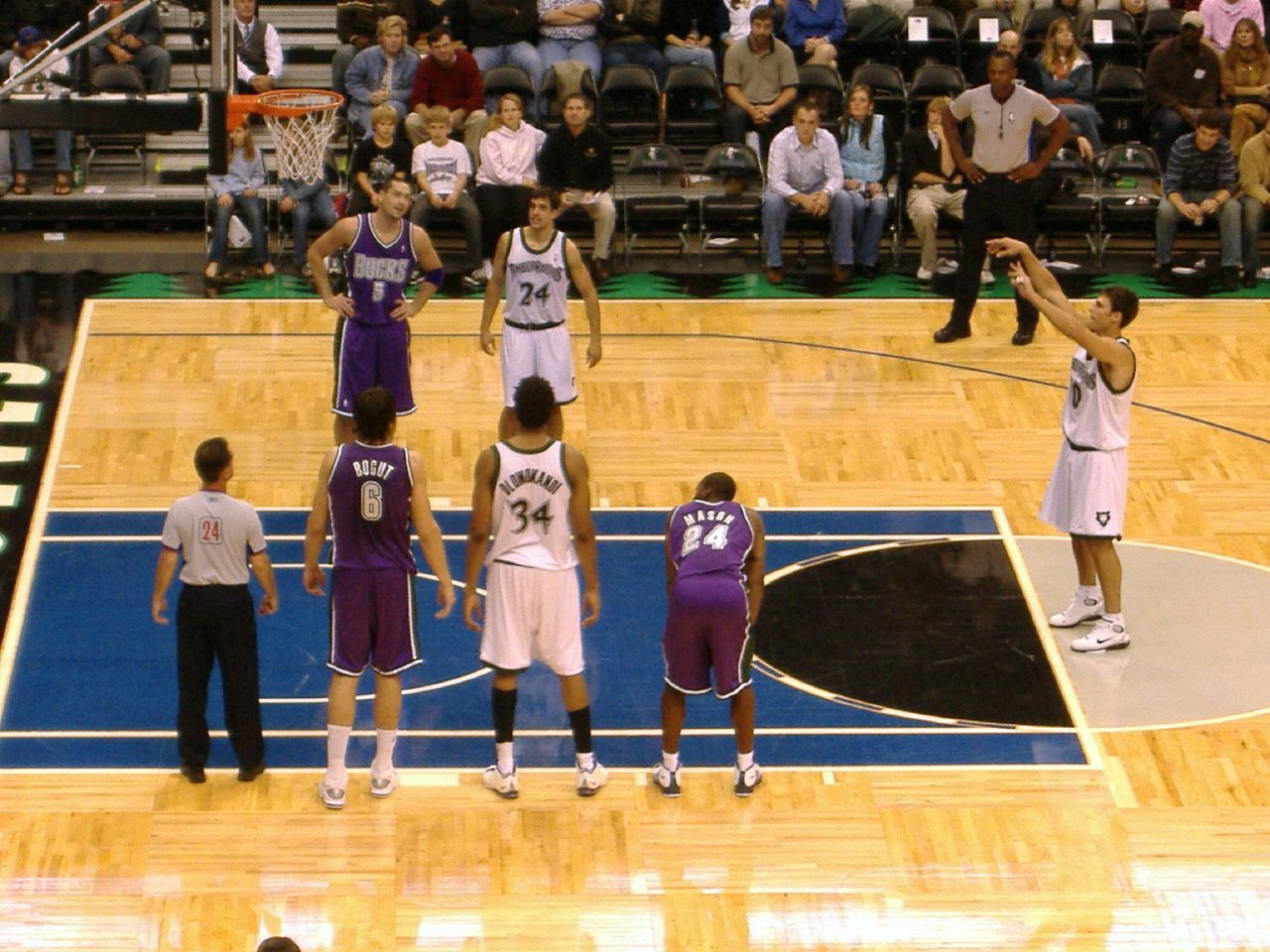
Wally Szczerbiak shoots a free throw; in most leagues, the team of the free throw shooter has at most two players (aside from the free throw shooter) on the sides of the key, while the opposing team has three.

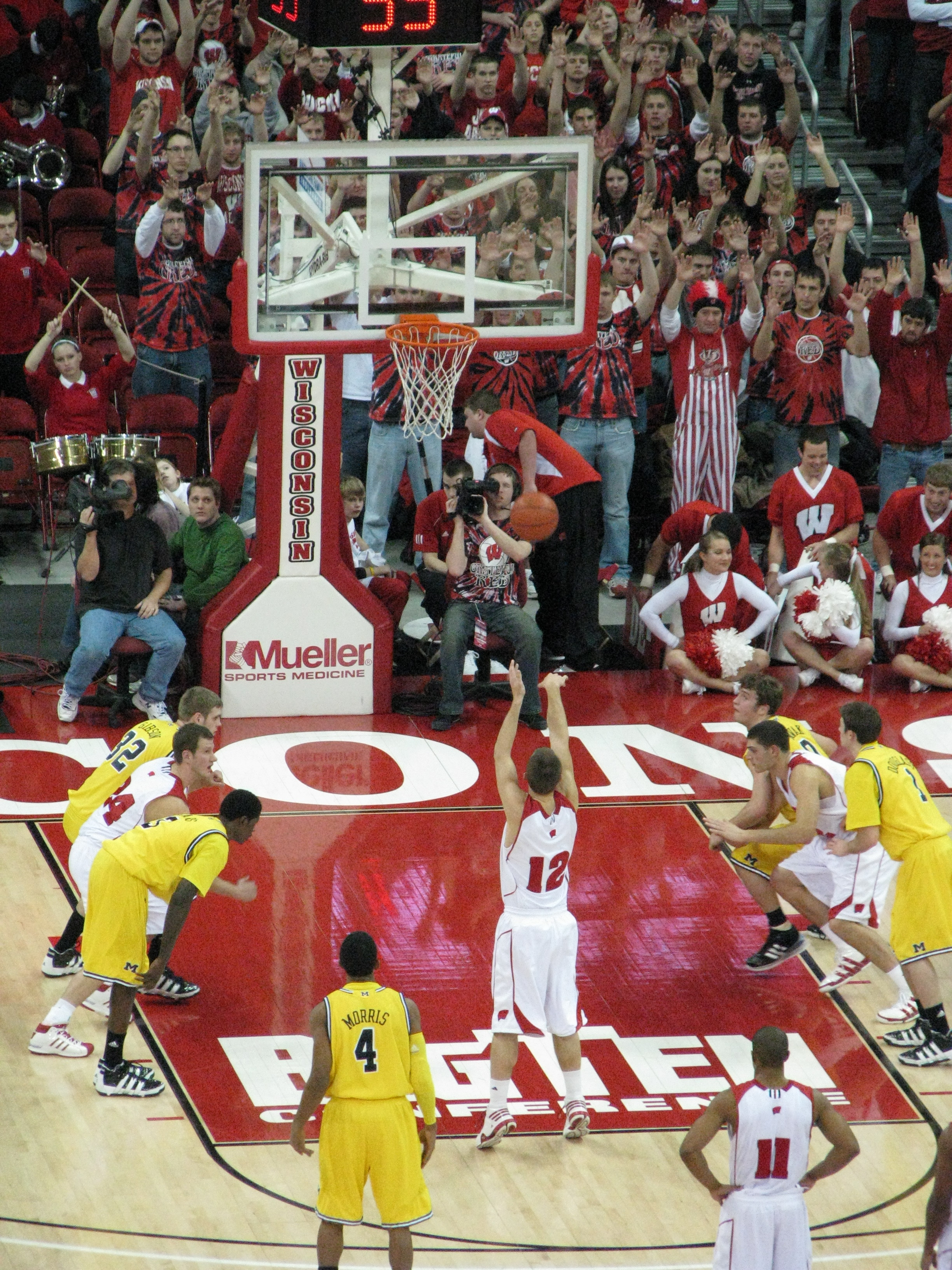
Jason Bohannon shoots a free throw; in the American NCAA and NAIA, there can be at most three players on each side of the key during a free throw.

When a player is shooting free throws, a certain number of players are allowed at the boundaries of the key, each occupying a slot traced at the boundaries of the key. The free throw shooter is behind the free throw line, and in most leagues three of his opponents are along the sides of the key, one side with two players, the other with one. Two of his opponents are situated nearest to the basket on both sides, while his two teammates are beside the two opponents closest to the basket, with the other player from the opposing team situated farthest from the basket. In the U.S. NCAA and NAIA, there are as many as six players along the key, with the opposing team allowed to have as many as four players, with the same arrangement as in the NBA and FIBA but with another player facing his teammate farthest to the basket. NFHS rules on this point are identical to NCAA/NAIA rules.

No player along the lane may enter the key until the shot is released. The player shooting the free throw, and anyone at top of the key, may not cross the free throw line until the ball hits the rim. If any of the offensive players violate the rule, no points are awarded for the shot and, if there are no more shots remaining, the ball is given to the defending team. If a defending player enters the lane too soon, an extra shot will be awarded regardless of whether the shot was made or missed.

In FIBA play, if the shooter commits the violation, it is an automatic turnover. If the shot is successful and the shooter does not commit a violation, but other players do commit a violation, all violations are dismissed. If players on the opposing team enter the key prior to the release of the ball, a jump ball determines who gets the possession of the ball (NBA) or the possession arrow rule (for all other levels). In FIBA play, that only applies if the shooter misses, since a successful attempt negates all other penalties. In all situations, lane violation penalties cannot occur if there are further free throws pending.

=== Restricted area arc ===
In the NBA, Euroleague, FIBA, NCAA, and NAIA play, the key has an arc extending four feet from the basket (NBA, NCAA, NAIA), or 1.25 meters (approximately 4.1 feet) (FIBA). The area behind the arc, or the arc itself, is called the "restricted area" (RA) in the NBA, the "restricted area arc" in the NCAA and NAIA, and the "no-charge semicircles" in FIBA. This arc is not used in NFHS play.

Its purpose is to prevent secondary defenders from taking a position under the basket in an attempt to draw an offensive foul while a player is driving to the basket. If a player on offense drives past his primary defender on the way to the basket and a secondary defender steps in, he must establish a position outside the RA to draw an offensive foul. If the drive starts inside the Lower Defensive Box (LDB – the area from the bottom tip of the free throw circle to the end line between the two 3‑foot posted-up marks), the secondary defender is allowed to be positioned inside the RA. The restricted area does not apply if the secondary defender jumps in attempting to block the shot, and the offensive player leads with his leg or knee in an unnatural motion or uses his off arm to prevent the defender from blocking his shot. The RA does not extend from below the backboard to the baseline. Therefore, if a player drives the baseline and is not attempting to go directly to the rim, the RA does not apply.

The restricted area arc rule first appeared at any level of competition in the NBA for the 1997–98 season. It was applied in NCAA men's basketball for the 2010–2011 season. The NCAA approved adding a visible restricted-area arc three feet from the center of the basket in Division I men’s and women’s games for the 2011–2012 season. The panel delayed implementation of the arc until the 2012–2013 season for Divisions II and III to allow those schools more time to plan and place the restricted-area arc in their home arenas. Starting with the 2015–2016 season, the NCAA moved the RA arc out to four feet from the center of the basket; the NAIA followed suit.

== Terms ==
Points made on the key are termed as points in the paint or inside points. Historically, the area of the key where offensive players are prohibited from remaining longer than three seconds has been painted to distinguish the area from the rest of the court; hence the phrase "points in the paint."

The area around the free throw circle's farthest point from the basket is called the top of the key, or top of the circle, and shots from this area in high school result in three points. Several plays also take place around the top of the key, such as screens and pick and rolls.

The intersection of the free throw line and the free throw lane is referred to as the elbow of the key.

The lane lines have marks separating where players stand during a free throw attempt. The one nearest the basketball is marked wider than the others, and is known as the block.

== See also ==
- NBA records
