= Man-to-man defense =

Defensive tactic in sports emphasizing 1-on-1 coverage assignments

Man-to-man defense, man defense, man-on-man defense, or player-on-player defense, is a type of defensive system used in team sports such as American football, association football, Australian rules football, basketball and netball, where each player is assigned to defend and follow the movements of a single player on offense. A player often guards his counterpart (e.g. center guarding center), but may also be assigned to guard a different position. However, the strategy is not rigid, and a player might switch assignment if needed, or leave his own assignment for a moment to double-team an offensive player. The term is commonly used in both men's and women's sports. The alternative to man-to-man defense is zone defense, a system of defense in which each player guards an assigned area rather than a specified opponent.

== Advantages ==
The main reasons a team would want to play man-to-man are:

- More aggressive than the zone defense.
  - It also allows a team's best defender to stay on a player who must be guarded at all times. In special cases, teams can play a Box-and-one defense which is designed to deny one specific opposing player by having a defender never leave their side so that they cannot get the ball.
- No middle penetration
  - Even if the attacker gets past his defender in a man-to-man defense, they will be caught by the rest of the defenders. They will either have the ball stolen from them, or forced into making an inaccurate pass.
- Denies passes to the left and right wings
  - Man-to-man not only puts pressure on the ball, but on players that do not have the ball as well. The offense will usually have to do pick and rolls in order to pass it to a wing depending on the severity of the pressure.
- A great defense to build trust within the team
  - When a dribbler gets past their defender, it is not a complete disaster, because the defender can rely on his team to back him up. When defending against screens, players must communicate and trust each other.
- Defenders stay in a balanced stance
  - Defenders need to always be alert so they can react as soon as possible. Defenders should always stay in a position that allows them to stick out their arm full length in front and be able to touch the players they are defending.

== Disadvantages ==
Some risks and downsides of playing it:

- The disadvantage is that it allows the offensive team to run screens more effectively.
  - Since the defenders are guarding their own man, setting a screen on a defender is very easy to execute, but extremely hard to defend against.
- It leaves weaker or slower defenders more exposed. In a man-to-man defense, those defenders are generally teammates staying close to their own assigned offensive player, and thus are often not in a good position to offer help should a weaker defender be eluded by the offensive player he is trying to guard.
- Communication is essential
  - Teams need to be constantly talking with each other to run an effective defense. For instance, when a dribbler gets past a defender, the defender needs to tell his team someone got past him so that they can collapse and stop the dribbler from reaching the hoop. When the offense is setting screens and doing pick and rolls, the defense needs to be talking with each other as to whether they should stay with their man or switch. Communication can be an advantage or disadvantage depending on how proficient they are at it.

== History of man-to-man ==
Zone defenses were disallowed by the National Basketball Association in 1947. During this time, an illegal defense violation was called when a defender was either guarding an area instead of a specific offensive player or was double teaming an offensive player away from the ball. A rule change in 2001 eventually permitted zone defense, but also specified that a defender who is standing inside the key is limited to not guarding an offensive player at arm's length for no more than three seconds. If the defender violates this rule, a technical foul is assessed against his team, and the opposing team is granted one free throw and subsequent possession of the ball. This makes it difficult for NBA teams to play zone since such defenses usually position a player in the middle of the key to stop penetration.

Man-to-man defense is still the primary defensive scheme in the NBA, and some coaches use it exclusively.

== Technique ==
When defending the ball (i.e. guarding the man with the basketball) away from the basket, players should typically use a version of the following technique: the defender stands and faces the opponent. He is positioned halfway between the ball and the basket and may be angled in one direction or another depending on the defensive scheme of that defender's team. He has his feet positioned beyond shoulder width with most of the weight distributed to the ball onto his feet. However, the defender's heels should not be off the floor as this will make him imbalanced. The defender's knees should be bent at roughly a ninety-degree angle with the bottom of his thighs parallel to the ground. This will place the defender's buttocks in a seated position. The defender's back should be straight with a slight tilt forward. This will place the defender's head over the center of his body and maintain proper balance. Depending on the teachings of his coach, the defender should position his hands wide as if he were stretching his wingspan or place one hand high and one hand low. Keep at arm's length at all times. This allows the defender to react quickly enough to anything the attacker might do. It is okay to play a little further back or even slightly closer. It just depends on how confident the player is in his abilities and the skill of the attacker. Looking at the opponent's chest is helpful in reacting to their moves as well. It is easy for an offensive player to fake with their head, eyes, or body. The spot on a player that is most difficult to fake with is their chest.

== See also ==
- Box-and-one defense
- Man-to-man marking
- Zone defense
