= Five-second rule (basketball) =

Rule in basketball

In basketball, the five-second rule, or five-second violation, is a rule that helps promote continuous play. There are multiple situations where a five-second violation may occur.

== Five-second throw-in violation ==
Under all basketball rule sets, a team attempting to throw a ball in-bounds has five seconds to release the ball towards the court. If they do not, they lose possession, and the opponent inbounds the ball at the previous out of bounds spot. The five second clock starts when the team throwing it in has possession of the ball (usually bounced or handed to a player while out of bounds by the official).

== Five-second closely guarded violation ==
A five-second closely guarded violation may be called against an offensive player with the ball when that player is guarded closely for five seconds or more, and does not pass, shoot, or dribble within that time.

Under NCAA men's rules, to be considered "closely guarded", a defender must be guarding a player who is located in the frontcourt and within six feet of the player. The count applies to a player who is only holding the ball. Prior to the 2015–16 season, the rule included those dribbling the ball as well. This allows for multiple closely guarded counts to occur. NCAA women's rules require the defender to be within three feet and can occur anywhere on the playing court, but only applies when the offensive player is holding the ball. A count ends whenever the player with the ball gets his head and shoulders past the defender, the defender is no longer within the required distance, the same defender does not continuously closely guard the player in control of the ball, or another opponent is between the defender and the ball.

High school rules mimic men's college basketball's closely guarded rule. A defender must be guarding the player in control of the ball, in the frontcourt, and must be within six feet of the player. A player may be holding or dribbling the ball. If defensive teammates switch, and both are within six feet of the player in control of the ball, the same count is continued.

Under FIBA rules, a defender must be within one meter of a player holding the ball and must be in an active guarding position. This count can occur anywhere on the playing court.

In the NBA this rule is applied only in a throw in scenario.

A five-second count will begin if an offensive player with the ball and not facing-up starts dribbling below the free throw line extended while being closely guarded or starts dribbling outside and then penetrates below the free throw line extended while being closely guarded. (The five-second count commences when the offensive player penetrates the free throw line extended.) After five seconds, a violation will have occurred, the offensive team will lose possession, and the opposing team will throw in the ball from the out-of-bounds spot nearest the violation.

== Five-second back to the basket violation ==
In the NBA, a player in the frontcourt, below the free throw line extended, is not permitted to dribble the ball with his back or side to the basket for more than five seconds. The penalty is loss of possession; the opponent is awarded the ball at the free throw line extended. A count ends when:

- Player picks up his dribbling
- Player dribbles above the free throw line extended
- The defense deflects the ball

== Five-second free throw violation ==
A free throw shooter, under FIBA rules, must shoot the ball towards the hoop within five seconds after an official places it at the shooter's disposal. (Under North American rule sets, the shooter is allowed 10 seconds.)

Under FIBA rules, if there is a five-second free throw violation, and if the free throw is successful, then the point does not count, and the ball is awarded to the opponent at the free throw line extended, unless another free throw is to follow or a possession penalty is to follow.
