= Zone defense =

Defensive strategy in sports

Zone defense is a type of defensive system, used in team sports, which is the alternative to man-to-man defense. Instead of each player guarding a corresponding player on the other team, all defensive players are given an area (a zone) to cover.

A zone defense can be used in many sports where defensive players guard players on the other team. Zone defenses and zone principles are mainly used in association football, American football, Australian rules football, basketball, ice hockey, lacrosse, netball and Ultimate frisbee, among others.

== Basketball ==
In basketball, the names given to zone defenses start with the number of players on the front of the zone (furthest from the goal) followed by the numbers of players in the rear zones. For example, in a 2–3 zone two defenders cover areas in the top of the zone (near the top of the key) while three defenders cover areas near the baseline.

Match-up zone is a hybrid man-to-man and zone defense where players apply man-to-man defense to whichever opposing player enters their area. John Chaney, former head coach of Temple University, is the most famous proponent of this defense. Hybrid defenses also include box-and-one, where four defenders are in a 2–2 zone and one defender guards a specific player on the offense. A variant of this is triangle-and-two, where three defenders are in a 2–1 zone and two defenders guard two specific offensive players.

Zone defenses are common in international, college, and youth competition. In the National Basketball Association, zone defenses were prohibited until the 2001–2002 season. The introduction of zone defenses faced resistance from players, including Michael Jordan. Jordan is quoted as saying, "If teams were able to play zone defenses, he said, he never would have had the career he did." Other great players, such as Tim Duncan, Kevin Garnett, and Tracy McGrady have also confirmed that zone defenses made scoring more difficult compared to the 1990s NBA. The defensive three-second violation rule made it a little more difficult for teams to play zone, since such defenses usually position a player in the middle of the key to stop penetration, but teams adapted by teaching defenders to quickly exit and re-enter the paint, and by running schemes that legally reset the three-second timer.

== Australian rules football ==
The zone defence tactic, borrowed from basketball, was introduced into Australian football in the late 1980s by Robert Walls and revolutionized the game. It was used most effectively by Essendon Football Club coach Kevin Sheedy.

The tactic is used from the fullback kick in after a behind is scored. The side in opposition to the player kicking in places their forward players, including their full-forward and centre half forward, in evenly spaced zones in the back 50-metre arc. This makes it easier for them to block leading players and forces the kick-in to be more precise, in effect increasing the margin for error which can cause a turnover and another shot at goal. As a result, the best ways to break the zone are for the full-back to bomb it long (over 50 meters), often requiring a low percentage torpedo punt, or to play a short chipping game out of defence and then to switch play as opposition players break the zone. The latter has negated the effectiveness of the tactic since the 1990s.

Another kick-in technique is the huddle, often used before the zone, which involves all of the players from the non-kicking team huddling together and then breaking in different directions. The kicker typically aims in whichever direction the designated target (normally the ruckman) runs in.

== Gridiron football ==
A zone defense in gridiron football is a type of "pass coverage". See American football defensive strategy and zone blocking.

== Ice hockey ==
In ice hockey, players defend zones in the neutral zone trap and left wing lock.

== Lacrosse ==
In lacrosse, a zone defense is not as common as the normal man defense. It has been used effectively at the D-III level by schools such as Wesleyan University. They almost always use a 6-man “backer” zone, where they have three guys up top and three guys down low and they try to stay in their zone and not rotate as much as possible. When teams are a man down, many teams employ a “box and one” zone defense, where the four outside players stay in their designated zone while the fifth player follows the ball and stays on the crease man.

== Netball ==
Netball is a sport much like basketball with similar strategies and tactics employed, although consisting of seven players per team. Zone defense is one of the main defensive strategies employed by teams, along with one-on-one defense. Common variants include center-court block, box-and-two zone, diamond-and-two zone, box-out zone and split-circle zone.

== See also ==
- Box-and-one defense
- Man-to-man defense
- Zonal marking
