= Center (basketball) =

Basketball position

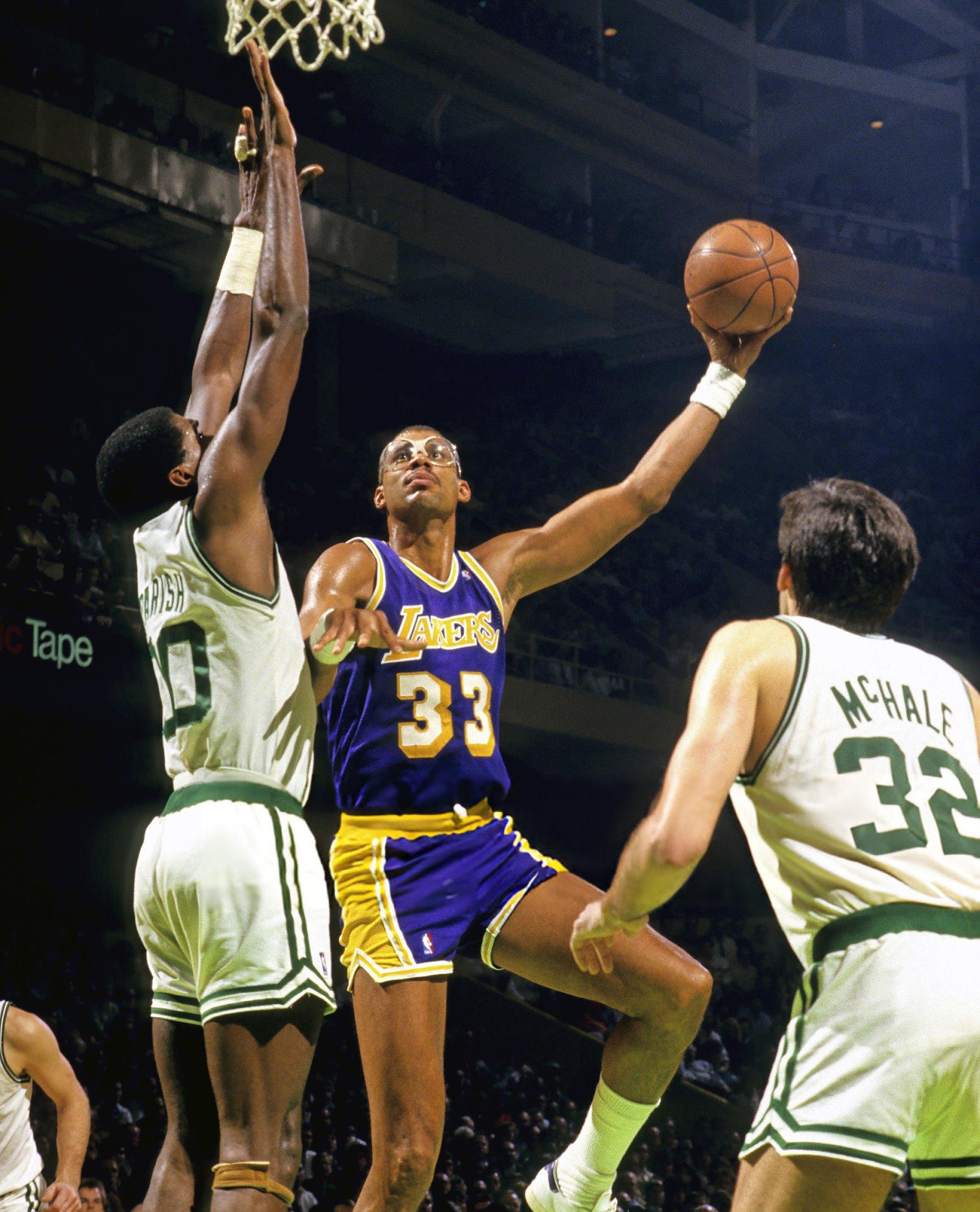
Center Kareem Abdul-Jabbar performs his signature shot, the skyhook, against the Lakers' rivals, the Boston Celtics.

The center (C), or the centre, also known as the five, the big or the pivot, is one of the five traditional positions in a regulation basketball game. The center is almost always the tallest player on the team, and often has a great deal of strength and body mass as well. In the NBA, the center is typically close to 7 feet (2.13 m) tall; centers in the WNBA are typically above 6 feet 4 inches (1.93 m). Centers traditionally play close to the basket in the low post. The two tallest players in NBA history, Manute Bol and Gheorghe Mureșan, were both centers, each standing 7 feet 7 inches (2.31 m) tall.

Centers are valued for their ability to protect their own goal from high-percentage close attempts on defense, while scoring and rebounding with high efficiency on offense. In the 1950s and 1960s, George Mikan and Bill Russell were centerpieces of championship dynasties and defined early prototypical centers. With the addition of a three-point field goal for the 1979–80 season, however, NBA basketball gradually became more perimeter-oriented and saw the importance of a traditional center diminish. Modern day big men include elite playmakers and passers such as Nikola Jokić and versatile scorers such as Bam Adebayo and Victor Wembanyama.

== History ==
=== 1940s–1950s: Emergence and George Mikan era ===
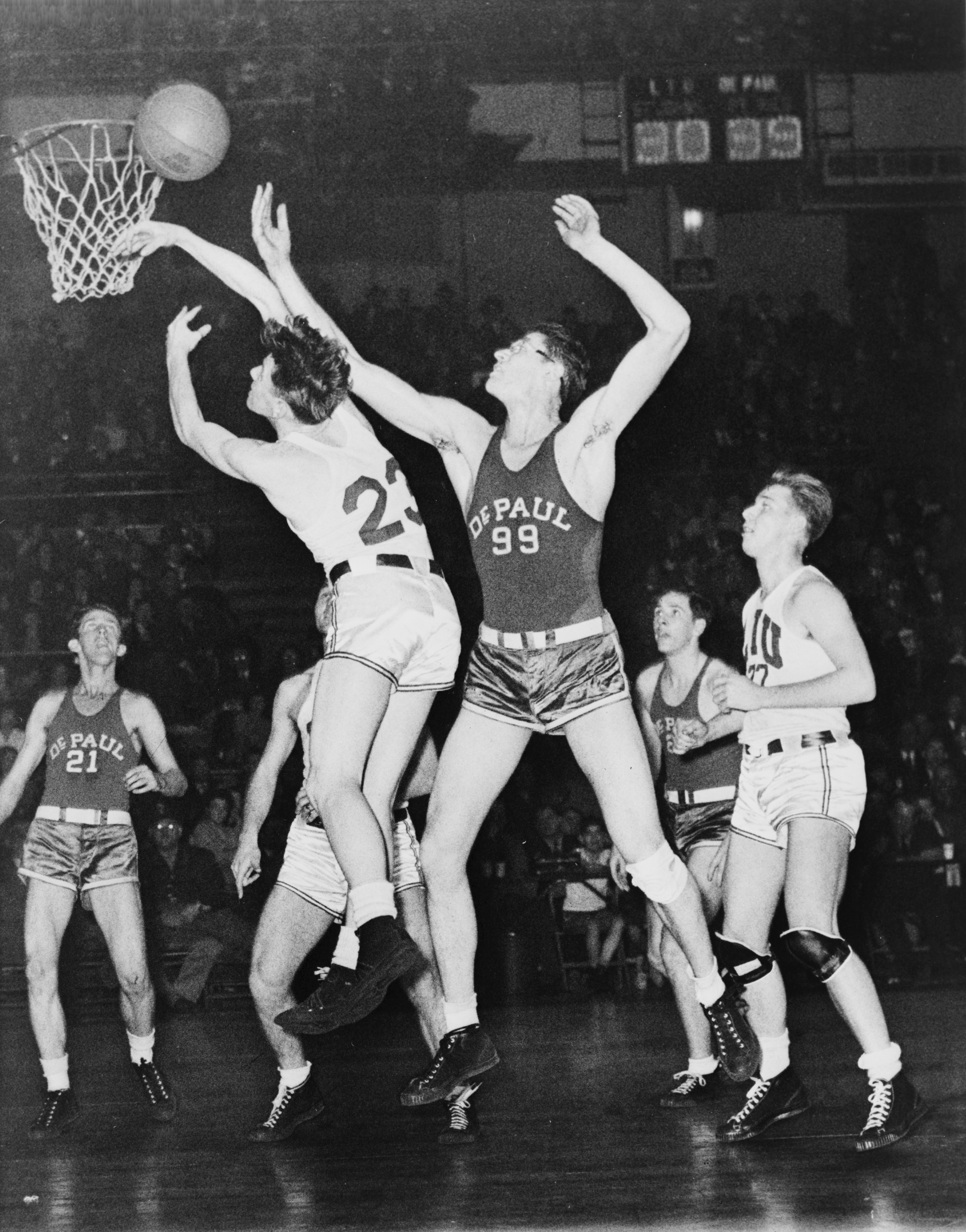
George Mikan with No. 99

The center is considered a necessary component for a successful team, especially in professional leagues such as the NBA. Great centers have been the foundation for most of the dynasties in both the NBA and NCAA. Until the 1940s, even dominant centers such as Moose Krause were not extraordinary tall. Then, the 6 ft 10 in (2.08 m) George Mikan and the 7 ft 0 in (2.13 m) Bob Kurland pioneered as exceptionally tall centers, shattering the widely held perception that tall players could not develop the agility and coordination to play basketball well, and ushering in the role of the dominant big man. While Kurland never played professional basketball after his time at Oklahoma State, Mikan turned professional in 1946 after leading DePaul to the NIT title. He went on to win seven National Basketball League, Basketball Association of America and NBA Championships in his ten-year career (1946–56), nine of them with the Minneapolis Lakers. Using his height to dominate opposing players, Mikan invented the hook shot and the shot block; as a consequence, the NCAA, and later NBA, adopted the goaltending rule, and in 1951 the NBA widened the foul lane, a decision known as the Mikan rule.

=== 1960s: Bill Russell–Wilt Chamberlain era ===
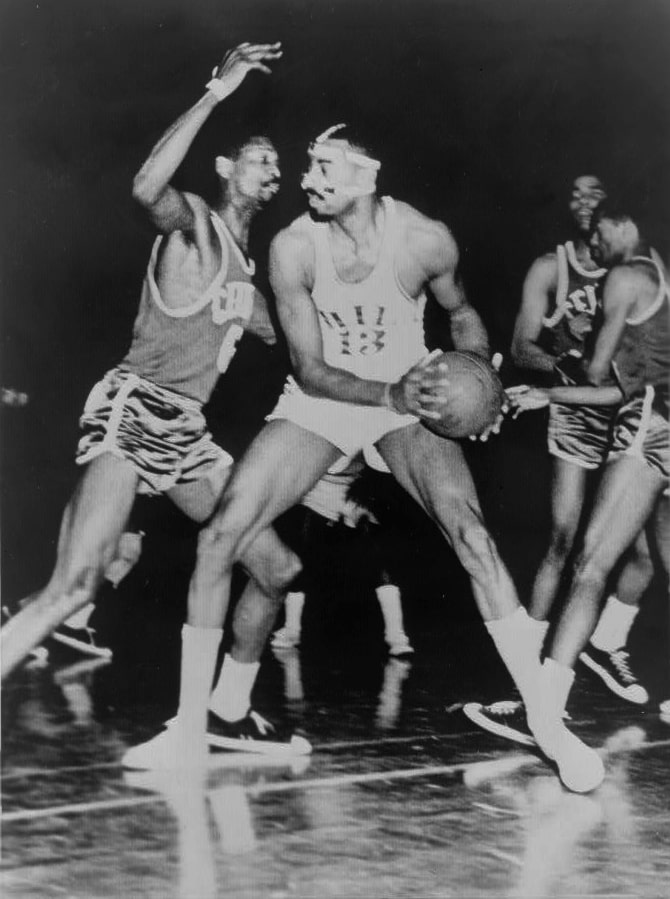
Bill Russell (left) and Wilt Chamberlain (right)

In the 1960s, Bill Russell and Wilt Chamberlain further transformed basketball by combining height with a greater level of athleticism than previous centers. Following the retirement of George Mikan, the rivalry of the two big men came to dominate the NBA. Between the two of them, Chamberlain and Russell won nine of the eleven MVP awards in the eleven-year period between 1958 and 1969; played against one another in six Eastern Conference Finals and two NBA Finals between 1959 and 1969. Many of the records set by these two players have endured today. Most notably, Chamberlain and Russell hold the top eighteen season averages for rebounds.

Bill Russell led the University of San Francisco to two consecutive NCAA championships (1955, 56). He joined the Boston Celtics and helped make them one of the greatest dynasties in NBA history, winning eleven championships over his thirteen-year career (1956–69) as well as five MVP awards. Russell revolutionized defensive strategy with his shot-blocking, rebounding and physical man-to-man defense. While he was never the focal point of the Celtics offense, much of the team's scoring came when Russell grabbed defensive rebounds and initiated fast breaks with precision outlet passes, primarily to point guard Bob Cousy. As the NBA's first African-American superstar, Russell struggled throughout his career with the racism he encountered from fans in Boston, particularly after the 1966–67 season, when he became the first African-American in any major sport to be named player-coach.

His principal rival Wilt Chamberlain, listed at 7 ft 1 in (2.16 m), 275 pounds (125 kg), lacked Russell's supporting cast. Chamberlain played college ball for the Kansas Jayhawks, leading them to the 1957 title game against the North Carolina Tar Heels. Although the Jayhawks lost by one point in triple overtime, Chamberlain was named the tournament's Most Outstanding Player. Briefly a member of the Harlem Globetrotters before joining the Philadelphia Warriors of the NBA in 1959, Chamberlain won two championships, in 1967 with the Philadelphia 76ers and 1972 with the Los Angeles Lakers, although his teams were repeatedly defeated by the Celtics in the Eastern Conference and NBA Finals, including two losses in the NBA Finals to Willis Reed and the New York Knicks in 1970 and 1973. He also won seven scoring titles, eleven rebounding titles, and four regular season Most Valuable Player awards, including the distinction, in 1960, of being the first rookie to receive the award. Stronger than any player of his era, he was usually capable of scoring and rebounding at will. Although he was the target of constant double- and triple-teaming, as well as fouling tactics designed to take advantage of his poor free-throw shooting, he set a number of records that have never been broken. Most notably, Chamberlain is the only player in NBA history to average more than 50 points in a season and score 100 points in a single game (both in 1961–62 as a member of the Philadelphia Warriors). He also holds the NBA's all-time records for rebounding average (27.2), rebounds in a single game (55), and career rebounds (23,924). While Chamberlain excelled in scoring and rebounding, he was also an adept passer for a big man. During his tenure with the 76ers, Chamberlain averaged around 7 assists per game, even leading the league in total assists in the 1967–68 season with 702.

A lesser-known center of the era was Nate Thurmond, who initially played the forward position opposite Chamberlain for the San Francisco Warriors but moved to center after Chamberlain was traded to the new Philadelphia franchise. Although he never won a Championship, Thurmond was known as the best screen setter in the league, and his averages of 21.3 and 22.0 rebounds per game in 1966–67 and 1967–68, are exceeded only by Chamberlain and Russell.

=== 1970s–1980s: Kareem Abdul-Jabbar era ===
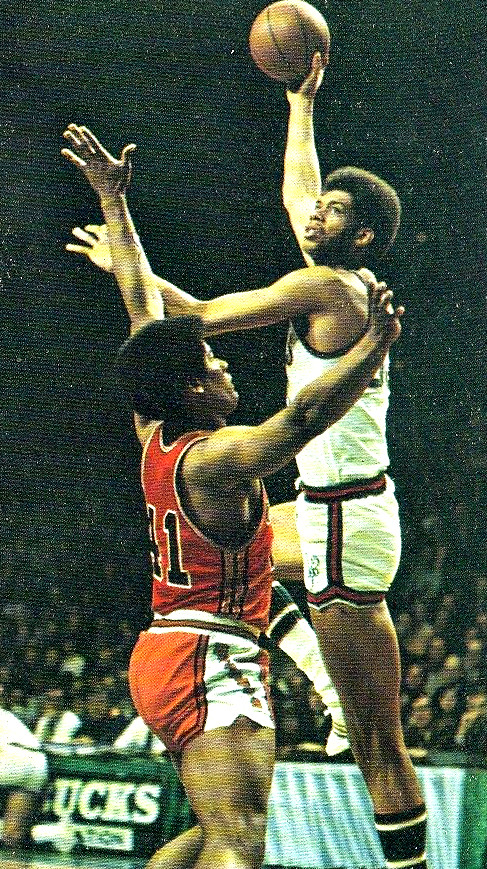
Kareem Abdul-Jabbar (right) against Wes Unseld (left)

In contrast to the Celtics dynasty of the 1960s, the 1970s were a decade of parity in the NBA, with eight different champions and no back-to-back winners. At the college level, the UCLA Bruins, under Coach John Wooden, built the greatest dynasty in NCAA basketball history, winning seven consecutive titles between 1967 and 1973. UCLA had already won two consecutive titles in 1964 and 1965 with teams that pressed and emphasized guard play. After not winning in 1966, Wooden's teams changed their style when Lew Alcindor became eligible. He led UCLA to three championships-in 1967, '68 and '69-while winning the first Naismith College Player of the Year Award. During his college career, the NCAA enacted a ban on dunking primarily because of Alcindor's dominant use of the shot. His entrance into the NBA with the Milwaukee Bucks in 1969 was timely, as Bill Russell had just retired and Wilt Chamberlain was 33 years old and increasingly plagued by injuries. After leading the Bucks to the 1971 NBA championship, teamed up with legendary point guard Oscar Robertson, Alcindor, who had converted to Islam, changed his name to Kareem Abdul-Jabbar. In 1975, Abdul-Jabbar was traded to the Los Angeles Lakers, and, after the arrival of point guard Magic Johnson in 1980, formed part of a new Lakers dynasty that won five NBA titles (1980, '82, '85, '87, '88). In addition, Abdul-Jabbar won six regular-season MVP awards (1971, '72, '74, '76, '77, '80). At 7'2" (2.18 m), 235 pounds (106 kg), he lacked the strength of Chamberlain in his prime, but had a longer wingspan and ultimately proved more durable, adhering to a strict physical-fitness regime that enabled him to play for twenty years, the longest career in NBA history at the time. Offensively, he was best known for his trademark 'Skyhook' hook-shot, almost impossible to block because of his height and wingspan. His regular season career scoring total of 38,387 points was an NBA record for nearly 39 years. Defensively, the 1973–74 season was the first in which the number of blocked shots were kept, and, over the next seven years, Kareem led the league in this statistic or finished second.

Another product of John Wooden's UCLA program, Bill Walton, appeared poised to join the ranks of great centers. He led UCLA to back-to-back NCAA titles in 1972 and 1973, he also led the Portland Trail Blazers to the NBA championship in 1977, and won the NBA MVP the following year. However, his career was plagued with injuries, most infamously a broken bone in his left foot suffered during his MVP season that he never fully recovered from, and he spent most of the following decade on the bench, although he eventually did win a second NBA title as a backup for the Boston Celtics in 1986, when he received the Sixth Man Award. Willis Reed won two championships with the New York Knicks in 1970 and 1973, teamed with point guard Walt Frazier; although undersized for the center position at 6'9", he had the strength to play inside, was a highly skilled jump shooter and was effective at setting picks, a key element in the Knicks motion-oriented offense. The undersized but scrappy Dave Cowens, drafted at the recommendation of Bill Russell, helped the Boston Celtics win two more NBA titles, in 1974 and 1976.

Leading centers of the late 1970s and early 1980s include Wes Unseld of the Baltimore/Washington Bullets, Artis Gilmore of the ABA Kentucky Colonels, Chicago Bulls and San Antonio Spurs; Moses Malone of the Houston Rockets and Philadelphia 76ers; and Robert Parish of the Boston Celtics, who was acquired from the Golden State Warriors in 1980 for the top overall pick in the NBA Draft. Unseld led the Bullets to four NBA finals appearances and one championship, in 1978. Using his strength and determination to compensate for his lack of size (6'7", i.e. 2.00 m), he was famous for his rebounding, shotblocking, and bone-jarring picks. Artis Gilmore, often overlooked because of the mediocrity of his teams, established himself as the best low-post scorer in the league. He set the NCAA Division I record for career average in rebounds (25.2) at tiny Jacksonville University, and enjoyed an illustrious ABA career before joining the NBA's Chicago Bulls in 1976, playing there until he was traded to San Antonio in 1982, for whom he played until his retirement in 1987. He remains the NBA's career leader in field goal percentage (minimum 2000 shots made) with a 59.9 percentage. Malone, the first high school player to turn professional, was drafted by the Houston Rockets after several years in the ABA, and won two MVP Awards and led Houston to its first NBA Finals in 1981, before joining the Philadelphia 76ers, where, teamed with Julius Erving and Bobby Jones, he won an NBA Championship in 1983, as well as a third League MVP. Never a dominant defender, his quickness and tenacity made him one of the best rebounders in NBA history, particularly on the offensive end; he led the league in rebounds six times in a seven-year period and still holds the NBA record for offensive rebounds.

In the mid-1980s, the 7 ft 4 in (2.24 m) Mark Eaton was the most prolific shot-blocker in the league, and, although never a major offensive contributor, won two NBA Defensive Player of the Year Awards while helping transform the lowly Utah Jazz into a playoff contender. Of all these players, none enjoyed the success of Robert Parish, who, with forwards Larry Bird and Kevin McHale, formed the legendary frontcourt of the Boston Celtics team that won three titles (1981, 1984 and 1986). The Celtics' fierce rivalry with the Lakers dominated the NBA during the decade and helped basketball reach an unprecedented level of popularity. Nicknamed "Chief" after a character in the film One Flew Over the Cuckoo's Nest because of his stoic demeanor, Parish was known for his trademark arching jump-shot—leading many experts to consider him the best medium-range shooting center of all time—and his ability to finish fast-breaks with his surprising speed. Playing until the age of 43, Parish broke Abdul-Jabbar's record for career games played.

The 1979–80 season saw the introduction of the three-point shot. While the concept of the 'stretch five' would not come until the new millennium, players such as Bill Laimbeer and Jack Sikma developed a reliable outside shot later in their career, hitting around the 30% mark.

=== 1990s: Hakeem Olajuwon–Patrick Ewing–David Robinson–Shaquille O'Neal era ===
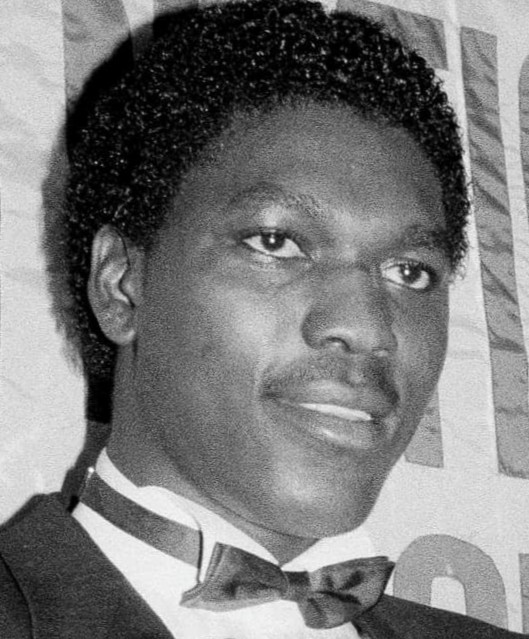
Hakeem Olajuwon

Coach John Thompson, once a seldom-used backup to Bill Russell with the Celtics, developed the Georgetown Hoyas into a chief pipeline for talent at the Center position, producing a succession of defensive big men in Patrick Ewing, Dikembe Mutombo and Alonzo Mourning. In 1984, Georgetown, led by Patrick Ewing, defeated the University of Houston, led by Hakeem Olajuwon, to win the NCAA championship. The number one picks in the 1984, 1985, and 1987 NBA Drafts would all be used on centers who made substantial impacts in the NBA of the 1990s and eventually became members of the Basketball Hall of Fame: Olajuwon in 1984, Ewing in 1985, and Navy's David Robinson in 1987.

The Nigerian-born Olajuwon was drafted by the Houston Rockets and paired with power forward Ralph Sampson in what was dubbed the 'Twin Towers' duo. In his second season, 1985–86, the Rockets upset the Lakers in the Western Conference finals. Olajuwon established himself as a dominant player, leading the Rockets to two consecutive NBA championships in 1994 and 1995. In the 1993–94 season he became the only player in NBA history to win the NBA's Most Valuable Player (MVP), Defensive Player of the Year, and Finals MVP awards in the same season. Defensively Olajuwon broke Abdul-Jabbar's career record for blocked shots. Offensively, he was best known for his 'Dream Shake', a series of fakes and spin moves regarded as the pinnacle of big man footwork.

Ewing, from Jamaica by way of the Boston area, was drafted by the New York Knicks in 1985, with whom he spent fifteen of his seventeen seasons in the NBA. An eleven-time All Star, Ewing was one of the best shooting centers in NBA history, possessing a baseline jump-shot, as well as being a formidable shot blocker and rebounder. The Knicks were formidable opponents of the Chicago Bulls dynasty in the Eastern Conference playoffs. Ewing's successor as the starting center at Georgetown, Dikembe Mutombo, who played most of his NBA career with the Denver Nuggets and Atlanta Hawks proved a dominant defender. Mutombo, who had not played basketball before arriving in the U.S. from his native Zaire on a USAID scholarship, was among the greatest shot blockers in NBA history, leading the NBA in blocked-shots five consecutive years, in the course of a career in which he ranked second in the history of the league in blocked shots, behind only Hakeem Olajuwon. He was also the recipient of four NBA Defensive Player of the Year Awards, tied for the record with Ben Wallace.

Robinson, drafted by the San Antonio Spurs in 1987, did not enter the NBA for two years due to his commitment with the United States Naval Academy. Upon his arrival in 1989, Robinson instantly transformed the Spurs into title contenders, eventually becoming a ten-time All-Star, MVP and Defensive Player of the Year. Leaner but more muscular than most centers, Robinson outran opponents with his speed and agility, while possessing a reliable left-handed jumper.

The 1992 NBA draft marked the entrance into the league of Shaquille O'Neal, who was drafted by the Orlando Magic. Immediately drawing comparisons to Wilt Chamberlain, the 7 ft 1 in (2.16 m), 325-pound (147 kg) O'Neal was billed as potentially the most physically dominating player ever. By his third season, he led the league in scoring and led the Magic to the NBA Finals, where they were swept by the Houston Rockets. After the 1995–96 season, he signed with the rebuilding Los Angeles Lakers. Former Georgetown center Alonzo Mourning, also drafted in 1992, established himself as a premier big man with the Charlotte Hornets and, later, the Miami Heat, winning two Defensive Player of the Year Awards thanks to his prolific shot blocking while also proving a reliable scoring threat.

=== 2000s: Changing times ===
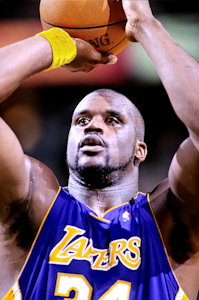
Shaquille O'Neal

The NBA landscape began to change in the 1990s as more international players entered the league. Yugoslavia's Vlade Divac and Lithuania's Arvydas Sabonis arrived in 1989 and 1995 respectively, and brought in a new play style. Unlike traditional post-up centers, Divac and Sabonis focused more on playmaking and perimeter shooting, hallmarks of the European style of play. In contrast to American players who were trained based on their size and individual athletic ability, European players were honed for their fundamentals regardless of size, and play a more team-oriented style of basketball.

The balance of power shifted to the Western Conference, and the NBA was dominated by the Los Angeles Lakers, who won titles in 2000, 2001, 2002, 2009, and 2010, and the San Antonio Spurs, who won in 1999, 2003, 2005, 2007, and 2014. Even as traditional centers such as Shaquille O'Neal and later on Yao Ming and Dwight Howard continued to dominate the game, the importance of a center was starting to change.

In the 1990s, an increasing number of smaller forwards, most notably Dennis Rodman and Charles Barkley, excelled at the traditional center functions of rebounding, shot-blocking and low-post defense, anticipating a trend towards relying on shorter and quicker post players that continued into the 2000s, as exemplified by perennial Defensive Player of the Year Ben Wallace. In the fast break oriented style of offense employed by a growing number of teams, the traditional role of the center is diminished, if not done away with altogether. Many talented big men choose to play the more versatile power forward position, giving them more room to run the floor and play outside the paint. Under the influence of European basketball, the offensive role of big men has been redefined to include more emphasis on perimeter play, as exemplified by 3-point shooting big men like Dirk Nowitzki, Mehmet Okur, Andrea Bargnani, and Channing Frye.

Most importantly, winning an NBA championship no longer required a dominant center, unlike in previous years. Perimeter players such as Larry Bird, Michael Jordan, Kobe Bryant, LeBron James, Kevin Durant, and Stephen Curry became the faces of modern championship teams, and in those instances, their centers were more of a complementary piece than a cornerstone.

=== 2010s–present: Rise of stretch five and playmaking centers ===
The low-post functions of the center position continued to dwindle in the 2010s as the NBA embraced small ball and a more perimeter-oriented style of play. While there are still a few centers that play a more traditional style, some centers begin to adapt to the outside game.

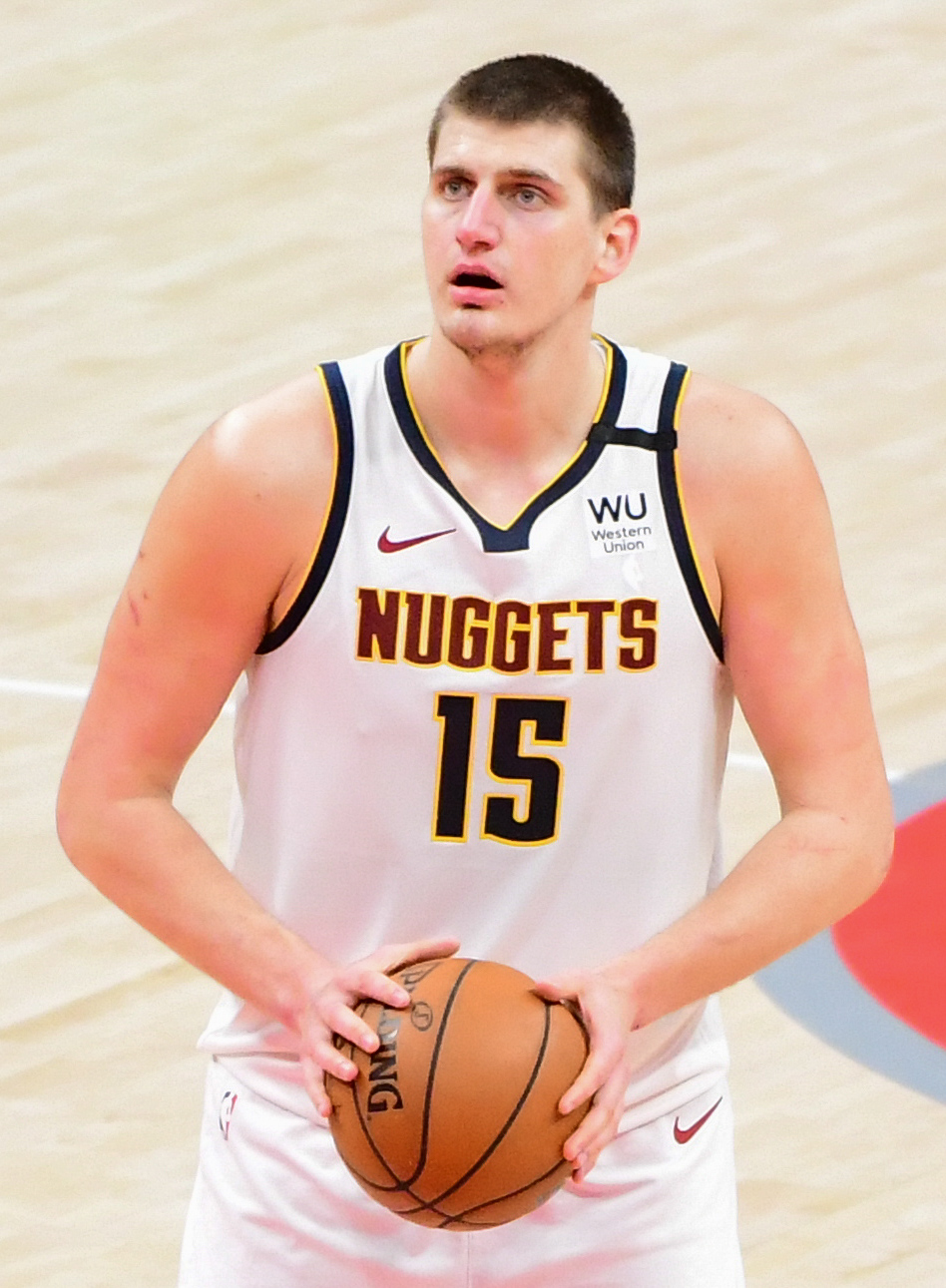
Nikola Jokić

The Miami Heat, for example, featured a "positionless" lineup as coined by head coach Erik Spoelstra, with power forwards Chris Bosh and Udonis Haslem shifting between center and power forward depending on matchups. The Heat won two NBA championships in 2012 and 2013 using this unconventional lineup.

The Golden State Warriors then won three championships in 2015, 2017, and 2018 with a smaller and quicker group known as the Death Lineup. In this case, 6'7" forward Draymond Green was often slotted into the center position, creating matchup problems for larger centers with his defensive versatility, speed, ball-handling skills, and perimeter shooting.

The rise of the stretch five paved the way for centers to add outside shooting to their arsenal. While they continue to roam the paint at times, they have also expanded their game to the perimeter with their three-point shots. Notable modern stretch fives include Al Horford, Joel Embiid, Karl-Anthony Towns, Brook Lopez, Marc Gasol, and Kristaps Porziņģis.

Another byproduct of the small ball revolution is the emergence of big men who possess guard-like skills. An example is Nikola Jokić, whose passing ability for a player his size made the Denver Nuggets contenders in the late 2010s and early 2020s, winning their first ever NBA Championship in 2023. Victor Wembanyama, at 7'4", also emerged as a highly touted prospect by dominating the French professional leagues, before getting drafted by the San Antonio Spurs as the first pick of the 2023 NBA draft.

Before 2021, the most recent center to win the NBA MVP award was Shaquille O'Neal in 2000. During the first half of the 2020s, centers won a combined four MVP awards, with Jokić winning three awards in 2021, 2022 and 2024, and Embiid in 2023.

== In women's basketball ==
In women's basketball, 7 ft 0 in (2.13 m) Uljana Semjonova played the center position, helping the Soviet Union women's team win two Olympic gold medals, in 1976 and 1980, and never losing a game in international competition. Semjonova also led her club team, TTT Riga to fifteen European Champion's Cup titles. The 6 ft 8 in (2.03 m) Anne Donovan led the Old Dominion University Lady Monarchs to the 1979 Association for Intercollegiate Athletics for Women championship, and was the first female Naismith College Player of the Year recipient in 1983, before enjoying a successful professional career in Japan and Italy.

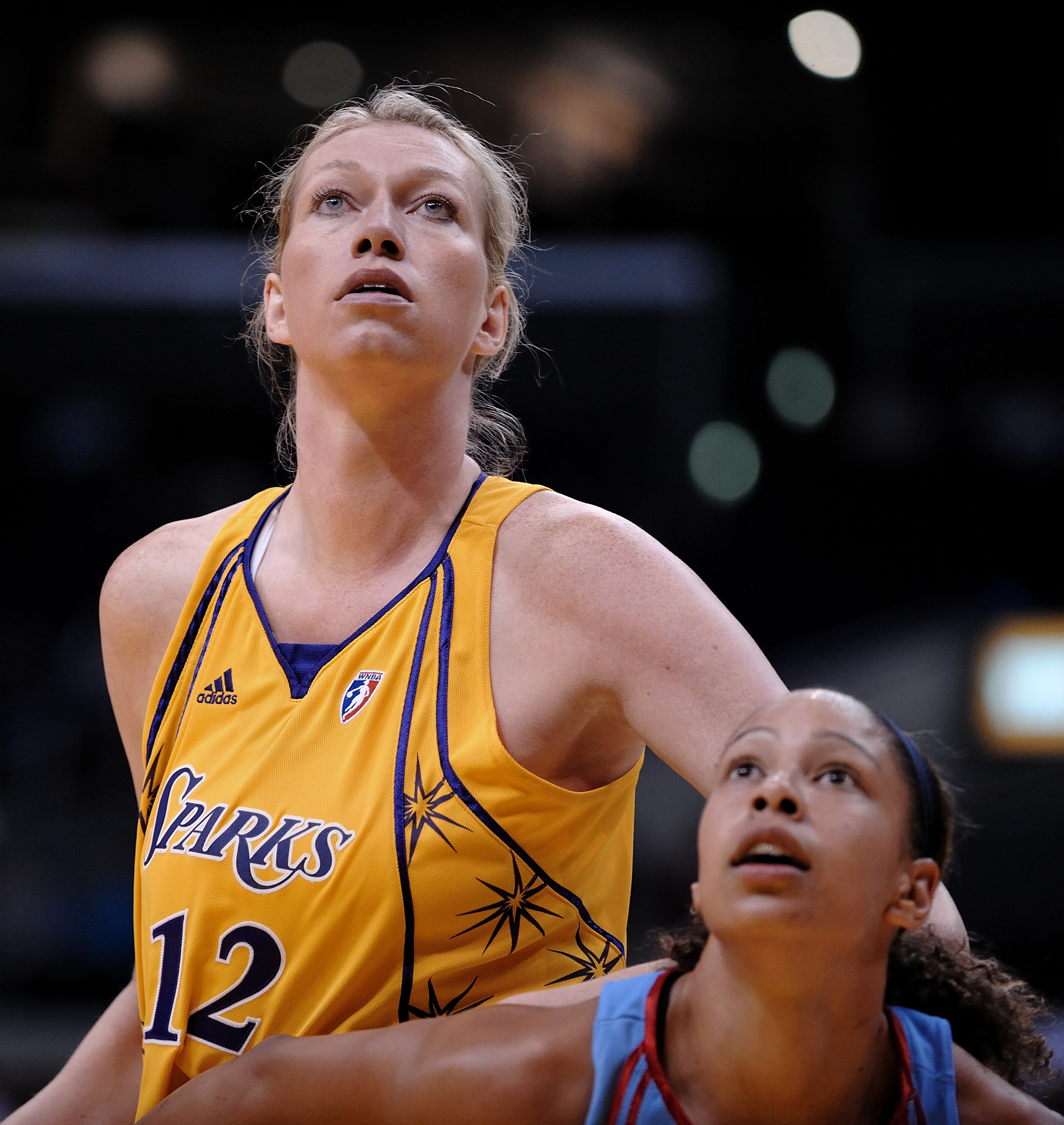
Margo Dydek

With the formation of the WNBA, Lisa Leslie established herself as the premier center, and the league's most popular player. The first WNBA player to reach the 3,000 point milestone, she led the Los Angeles Sparks to consecutive titles in 2001 and 2002, and holds the distinction of being the first player to dunk in a WNBA game. Other prominent centers in women's basketball include Australian Lauren Jackson of the Seattle Storm and Cheryl Ford of the Detroit Shock. Jackson can also be considered a forward-center because she is also a very good outside shooter, leading the WNBA in three-point shooting percentage in one season. Rebecca Lobo led the Connecticut Huskies to an NCAA Championship in 1995, but never recovered from a torn ACL and had a disappointing professional career. When at the University of Oklahoma, Courtney Paris was considered the next dominant female center after becoming the only NCAA player, male or female, to score 700 points, grab 500 rebounds and block 100 shots in a single season; however, she had a disappointing WNBA career and was waived before what would have been the start of her second season in 2010. The tallest center in the WNBA, the late Margo Dydek of Poland, who stood 7'2", is still the league's career leader in blocks per game (2.72) and total blocks (877), solidly ahead of Leslie in that category despite Dydek playing 40 fewer games before her retirement.

== See also ==
- List of tallest players in National Basketball Association history
