= Power forward =

Basketball position

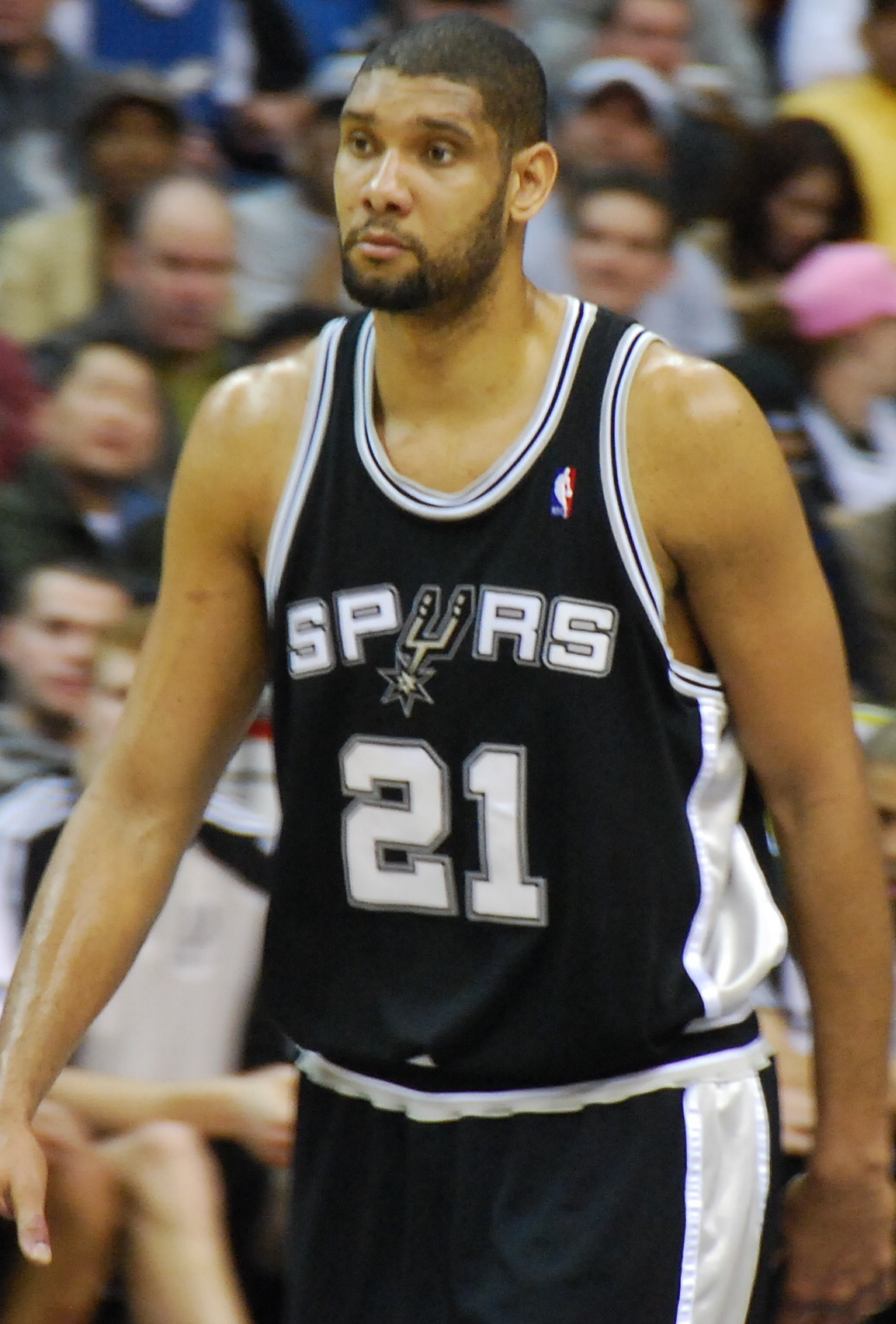
Tim Duncan is often regarded as one of the greatest power forwards in the history of the National Basketball Association (NBA).

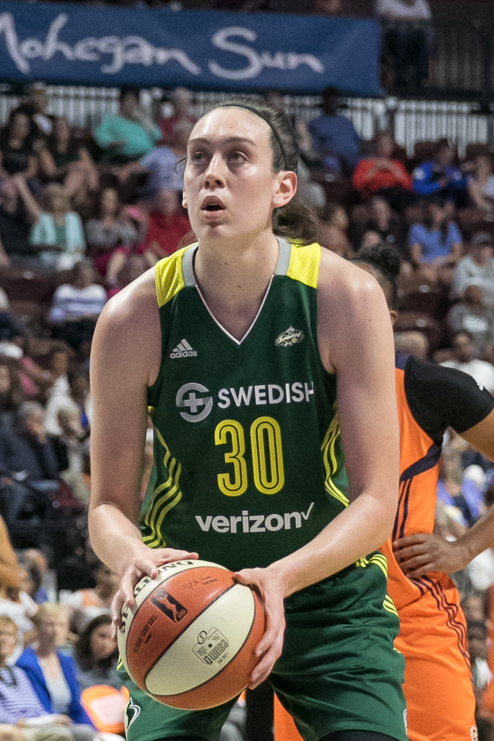
Breanna Stewart is regarded as a top power forward in the Women's National Basketball Association (WNBA).

The power forward (PF), also known as the four, is one of the five traditional positions in a regulation basketball game. Traditionally, power forwards have played a role similar to centers and are typically the tallest or second tallest player on the court. They are also usually leaner than centers. During an offensive possession, the power forward typically plays with their backs toward the basket and are typically a "go-to" position in regard to scoring in the post. In a pick and roll offense, the power forward typically sets a screen for a guard and "rolls" towards the basket to receive a pass (or "pops" towards the perimeter for an open shot). When on defense, they typically position themselves under the basket in a zone defense or against the opposing power forward in man-to-man defense. The power forward position entails a variety of responsibilities, including rebounding, screen setting, rim protecting, and scoring.

Many power forwards are noted for their mid-range jump-shot, and several players have become very accurate from 12 to 18 feet (3.7 to 5.5 m). Earlier, these skills were more usually exhibited in the European style of play. Some power forwards, known as stretch fours, have since extended their shooting range to include three-point field goals.

In the NBA, power forwards usually range from 6' 9" (2.06 m) to 7' 0" (2.13 m) while in the WNBA, power forwards are usually between 6' 0" (1.83 m) and 6' 3" (1.91 m). Despite the averages, a variety of players fit "tweener" roles which finds them in the small forward or center position depending on matchups and coaching decisions. Some power forwards, such as Draymond Green and even 6' 5" (1.96 m) P. J. Tucker, have played at the center position, possessing the skills, but lacking the height that is usually associated with the position.

Power forwards who have been inducted in the Naismith Memorial Basketball Hall of Fame include Karl Malone, Lauren Jackson, Vern Mikkelsen, Tina Thompson, Dirk Nowitzki, Chris Webber, Kevin Garnett, Dolph Schayes, Kevin McHale, Charles Barkley, Dennis Rodman, Elvin Hayes, Bob Pettit, Jerry Lucas, Dave Debusschere, and Tim Duncan.

== The "stretch four" ==
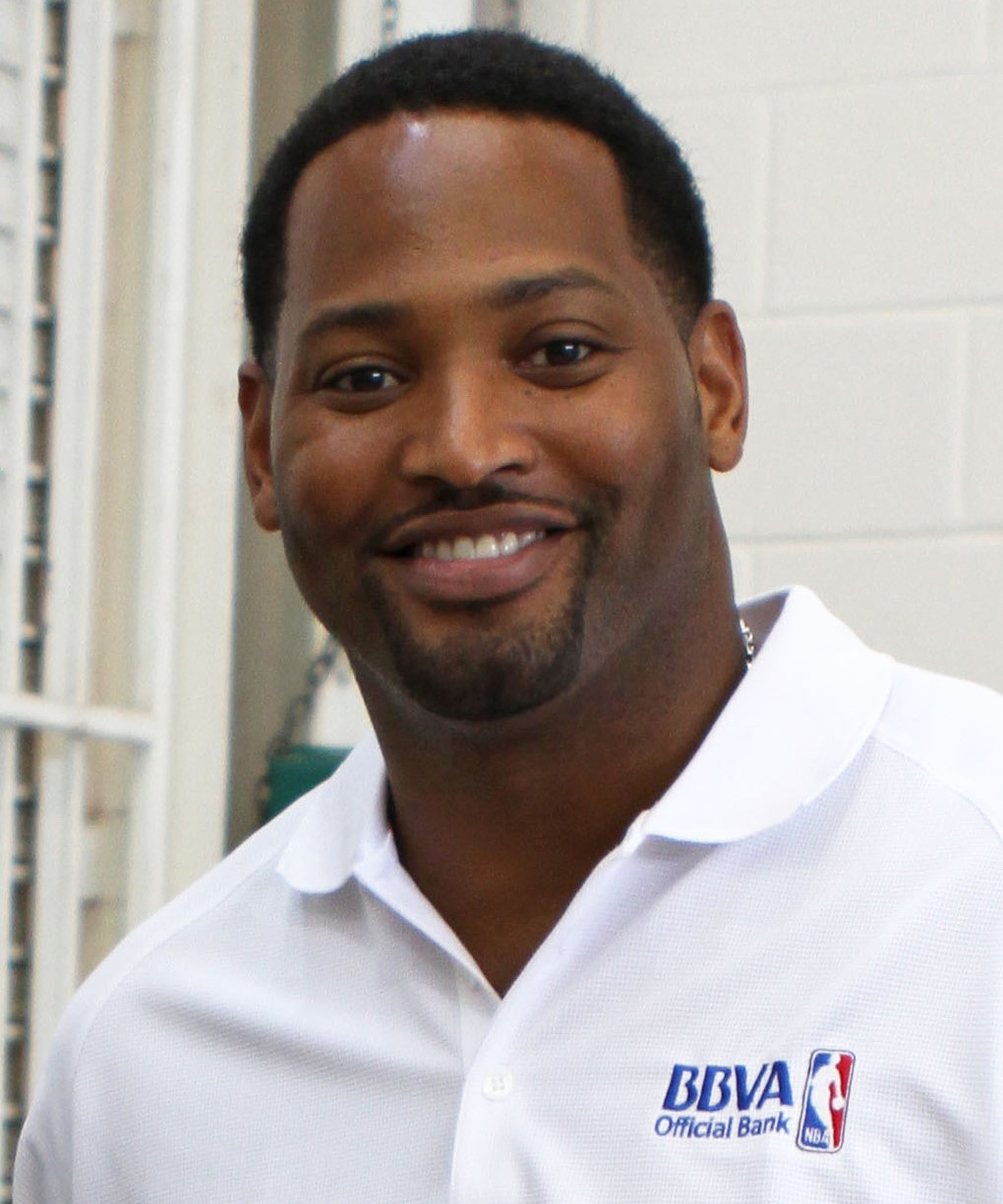
Power forward Robert Horry innovated the power forward position by pioneering the "stretch four" shooter.

Some power forwards are noted for their perimeter shooting, both from the mid-range and three-point distance. Since the 2000s, several power forwards have become very accurate from 12 to 18 feet (3.7 to 5.5 m). Earlier, these skills were more typically exhibited in the European style of play. Some power forwards, known as stretch fours, have since extended their shooting range to include three-point field goals. Some stretch fours utilize their mid-range scoring in the post. Dallas Mavericks franchise player Dirk Nowitzki utilized the fadeaway shot to great effect. Stretch fours have also proven to be reliable in certain pick and roll designs, in which the power forward "pops" away from the basket for an open shot if the guard is being doubled while moving off a screen. 6'10" (2.08m) power forward Amar'e Stoudemire utilized the "pick and pop" play to great effect while playing with Steve Nash on the Phoenix Suns from 2004 to 2010. Notable examples of stretch fours include Jayson Tatum, Robert Horry, Al Horford, Rasheed Wallace, Amar'e Stoudemire, Dirk Nowitzki, Carmelo Anthony, Kevin Love, and Steve Novak.
