= Pick and roll =

Offensive play in basketball

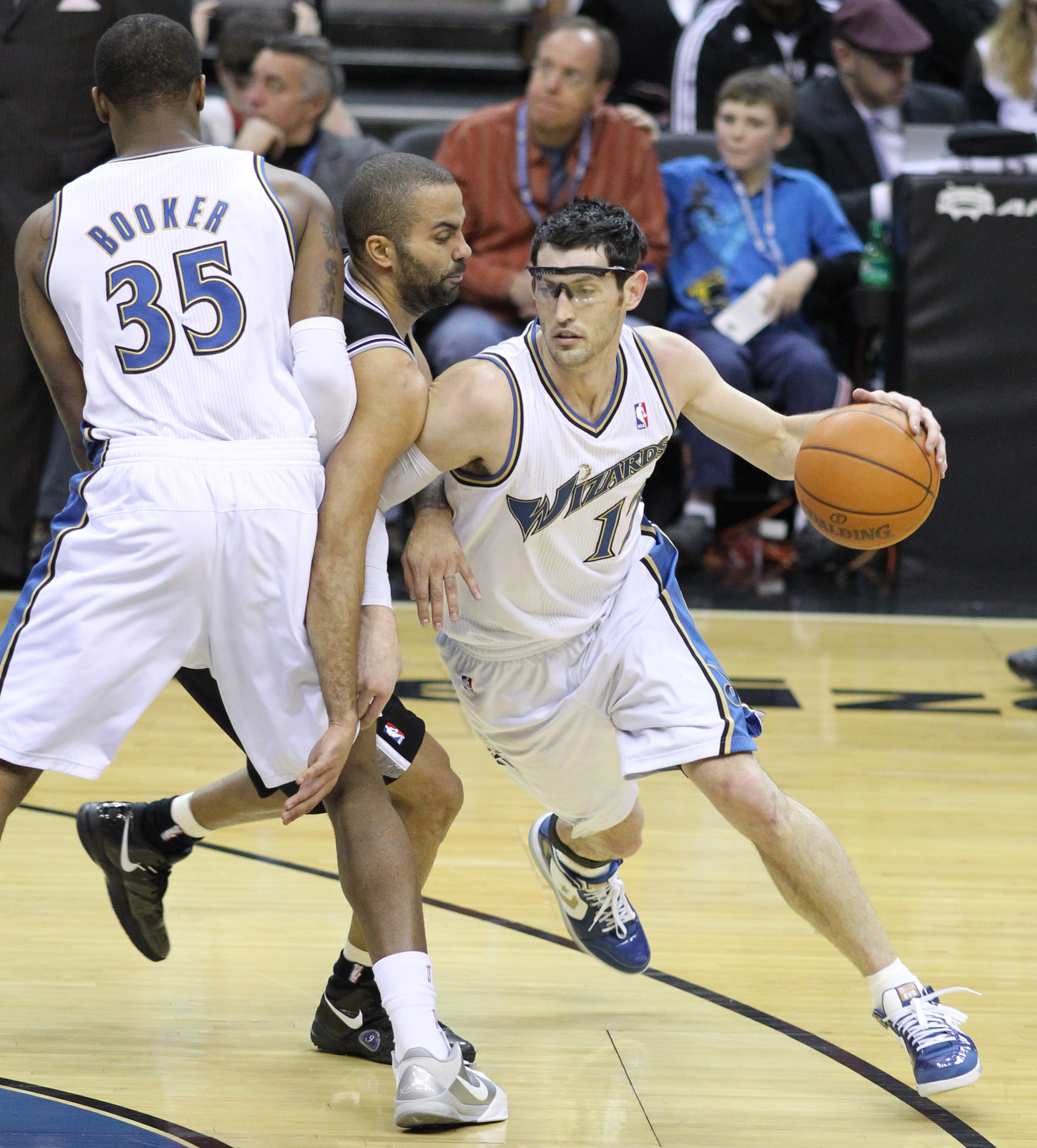
Trevor Booker sets a "screen" on Tony Parker for Kirk Hinrich

The pick and roll (also called a ball screen or screen and roll) in basketball is an offensive play in which a player sets a screen (pick) for a teammate handling the ball and then moves toward the basket (rolls) to receive a pass. In the NBA, the play came into vogue in the 1990s and has developed into the league's most common offensive action. There are, however, many ways in which the defense can also counter the offensive screen.

== Execution ==
The play (in its elementary form) involves three players. The play begins with a defender guarding a ballhandler. The ballhandler moves toward a teammate, who sets a "screen" (the "pick") by standing in the way of the defender, who is separated from the moving ballhandler. The defender is forced to choose between guarding the ballhandler or the screener. If the defender tries to guard the ballhandler, then the screener can move toward the basket (as the player defending the screener may try to trap or guard the ballhandler, giving the screener space) sometimes by a foot pivot (the "roll") and is now open for a pass. If the defender chooses instead to guard the screening teammate, then the ballhandler has an open shot. Alternatively, freed of his defender, the ballhandler may pass the ball to an open teammate. A well-executed pick and roll is the result of teamwork, but many players fail by executing the play too quickly; they must ignore the defense and control their own speed.

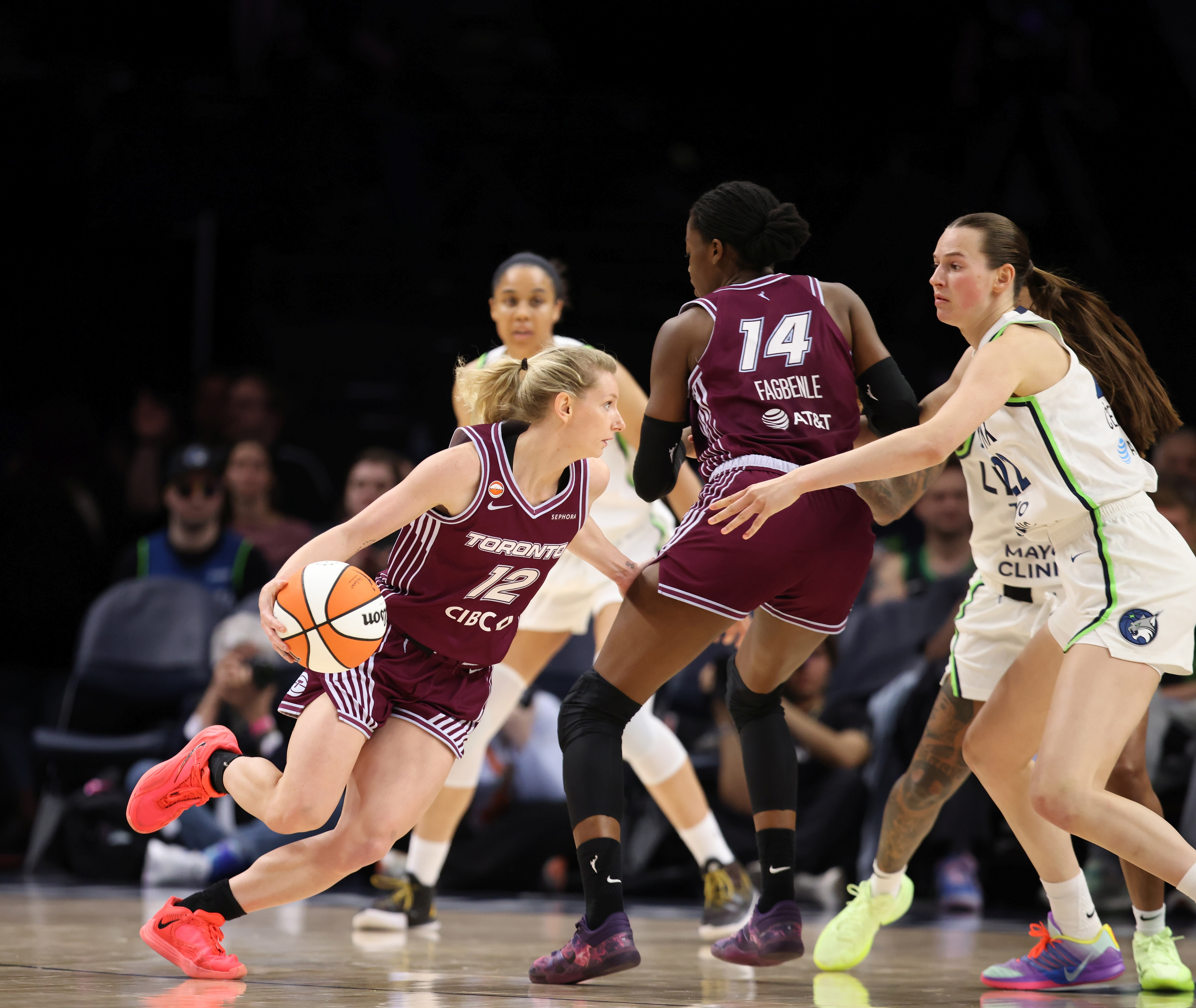
A center (#14 Temi Fagbenle) sets a "screen" on Courtney Williams to free guard Lexi Held

The pick and roll is often employed by a shorter guard handling the ball and a taller forward or center setting the screen; if the taller defender switches to guard the ballhandler, then the offensive team can have favorable mismatches: the shorter guard has a speed advantage over the taller defender, while the taller forward/center has a size advantage over the shorter defender.

=== Results ===
A successful pick and roll play may result in the screener being in position to receive a pass with a clear path for an easy shot, with the chance of drawing a foul as other defenders move toward the play to try to prevent penetration. It may alternately lead to the ballhandler being momentarily without a defender and thus free to take an uncontested shot, which greatly improves the chance of scoring, again with the chance of drawing a foul as the screened defender hurries to get back into the play, or pass to any open teammate.

The success of the strategy depends largely on the ballhandler, who must recognize the situation quickly and make a decision whether to take the shot, pass to the screener who is rolling (if the defender switches) or pass to another open teammate (if other defenders come to help). The screener also must recognize the open spaces of the court to roll to and be alert to receive the pass and finish the play.

== Other variations ==
Variations of the pick and roll are the pick and pop (or pick and fade), where the screener moves for an open jump shot instead of rolling to the basket, or the pick and slip, where the screener fakes setting a screen before slipping behind the defender to accept the pass.

=== Pick and pop ===
The pick and pop is an offensive play that is a derivative of the classic pick and roll. Instead of rolling toward the basket, the player setting the pick moves to an open area of the court to receive a pass from the ballhandler to "pop" a jump shot.

The premise of the two plays is the same: a ballhandler uses a teammate's pick shed his defender while at the same time the pick-setter frees himself up to receive the ball for a scoring opportunity. A successful pick and pop relies on a ballhandler who demands constant defensive attention and a teammate with an accurate jump shot.

== Notable uses ==
In the NBA, John Stockton and Karl Malone of the Utah Jazz used this play to great effect in the 1990s, leading their team to the NBA Finals in 1997 and 1998. Stockton, a point guard, was a good shooter and exceptional decision maker and Malone, a power forward, was a great finisher. When they were teammates on the Phoenix Suns, Steve Nash and Amar'e Stoudemire also utilized the high-screen pick and roll to great success. The Golden State Warriors' combination of point guard Stephen Curry and power forward Draymond Green are noted for their use of a stutter step high pick-and-roll set: Curry's long-range shooting ability often creates situations where the opposing team will attempt to double up their defenders against him. Curry will pass to Green as he rolls out of the screen, allowing Green to lead a 4-on-3 offense with the option to pass to wing shooters, lob an alley-oop or drive to the basket. According to Synergy Sports Technology, use of the pick and roll in the NBA rose from 15.6% of total plays in the 2004–05 NBA season to 18.6% in the 2008–09 NBA season. Another avid user of this move was Chris Paul, who was known for completing this move with his teammate DeAndre Jordan on the Los Angeles Clippers from 2011-2017.

Some of the most effective pick and roll duets in the Euroleague have been Dimitris Diamantidis and Mike Batiste of Panathinaikos B.C., Kostas Sloukas and Jan Veselý of Fenerbahçe İstanbul and Sergio Rodriguez and Kyle Hines of CSKA Moscow.

== Other sports ==
The pick and roll was also used extensively in box lacrosse, the sport played in the National Lacrosse League.

== See also ==
- NBA records
