= Point guard =

Basketball position

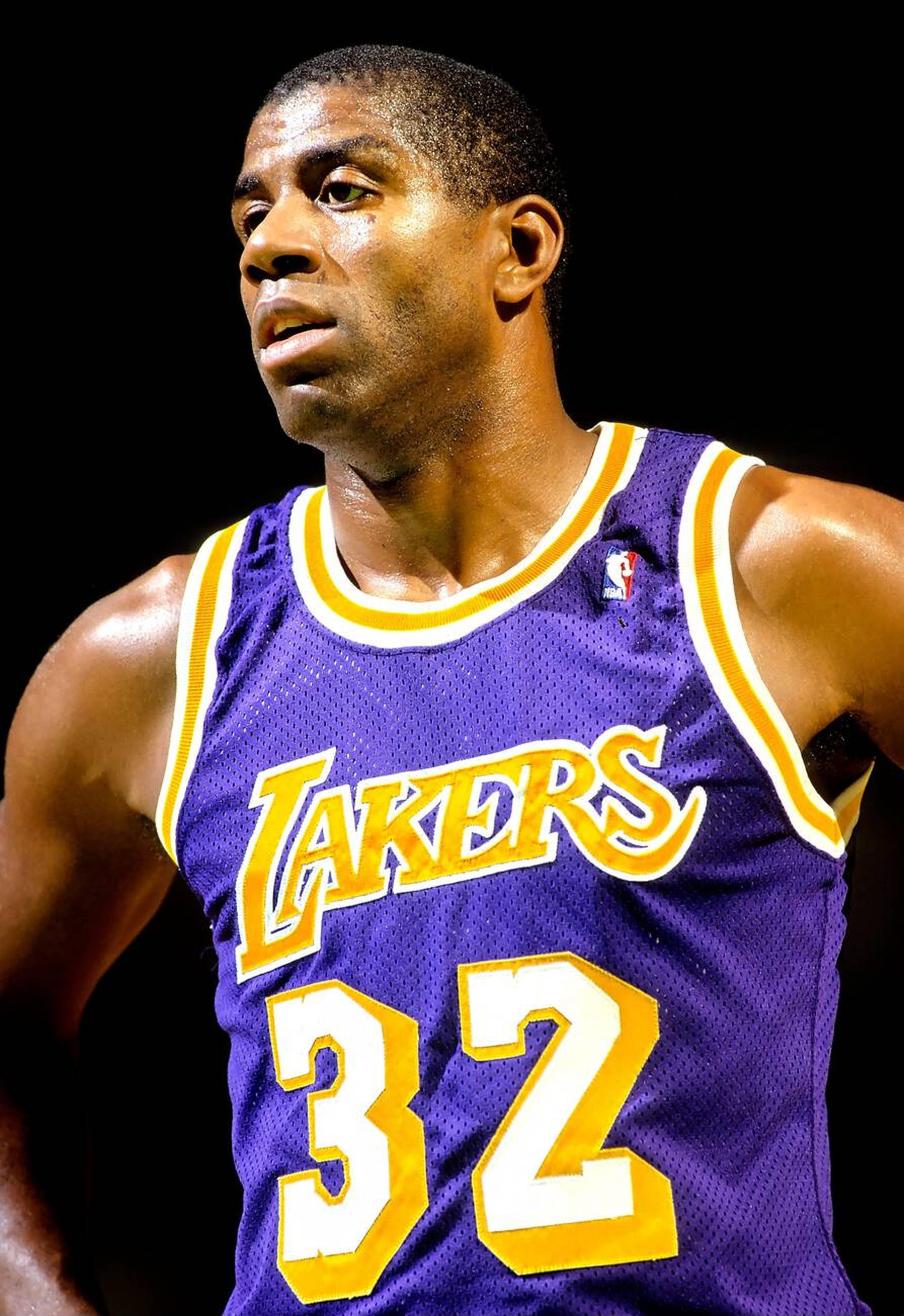
Magic Johnson, regarded as one of the greatest point guards in NBA history, in 1987

The point guard (PG), also called the one or the point, is one of the five positions in a regulation basketball game.

Point guards are expected to control the pace of the game. They effectively "run" the team's offense by controlling the ball and making sure that it gets to the right player at the right time. Generally, point guards are expected to be proficient in both passing and dribbling the ball, in order to facilitate ball movement. In a pick and roll offense, the point guard typically moves off screens to facilitate the ball to a big, in most cases either the power forward or the center. Likewise, point guards can also shoot off screens if given separation. In transition, the point guard must be able to pass and handle the ball without committing excessive turnovers. Defensively, the point guard is generally responsible for guarding above the key on the perimeter.

Above all, the point guard must understand and accept their coach's game plan; in this way, the position can be compared to the position of quarterback in gridiron football. They must also be able to adapt to what the defense is allowing and control the pace of the game.

== Overview ==
A point guard specializes in certain skills, like other player positions in basketball. Their primary job is to facilitate scoring opportunities for their team, or sometimes for themselves. Lee Rose has described a point guard as a coach on the floor, who can handle and distribute the ball to teammates. This typically involves setting up plays on the court, getting the ball to the teammate in the best position to score, and controlling the tempo of the game. Generally, a point guard should always look out for teammates and have the ability to pass well. A point guard should know when and how to instigate a fast break and initiate the more deliberate sets. Point guards are expected to be vocal floor leaders, with situational awareness of the shot clock and game clock times, the score, the number of remaining timeouts for both teams, and more.

== Examples ==
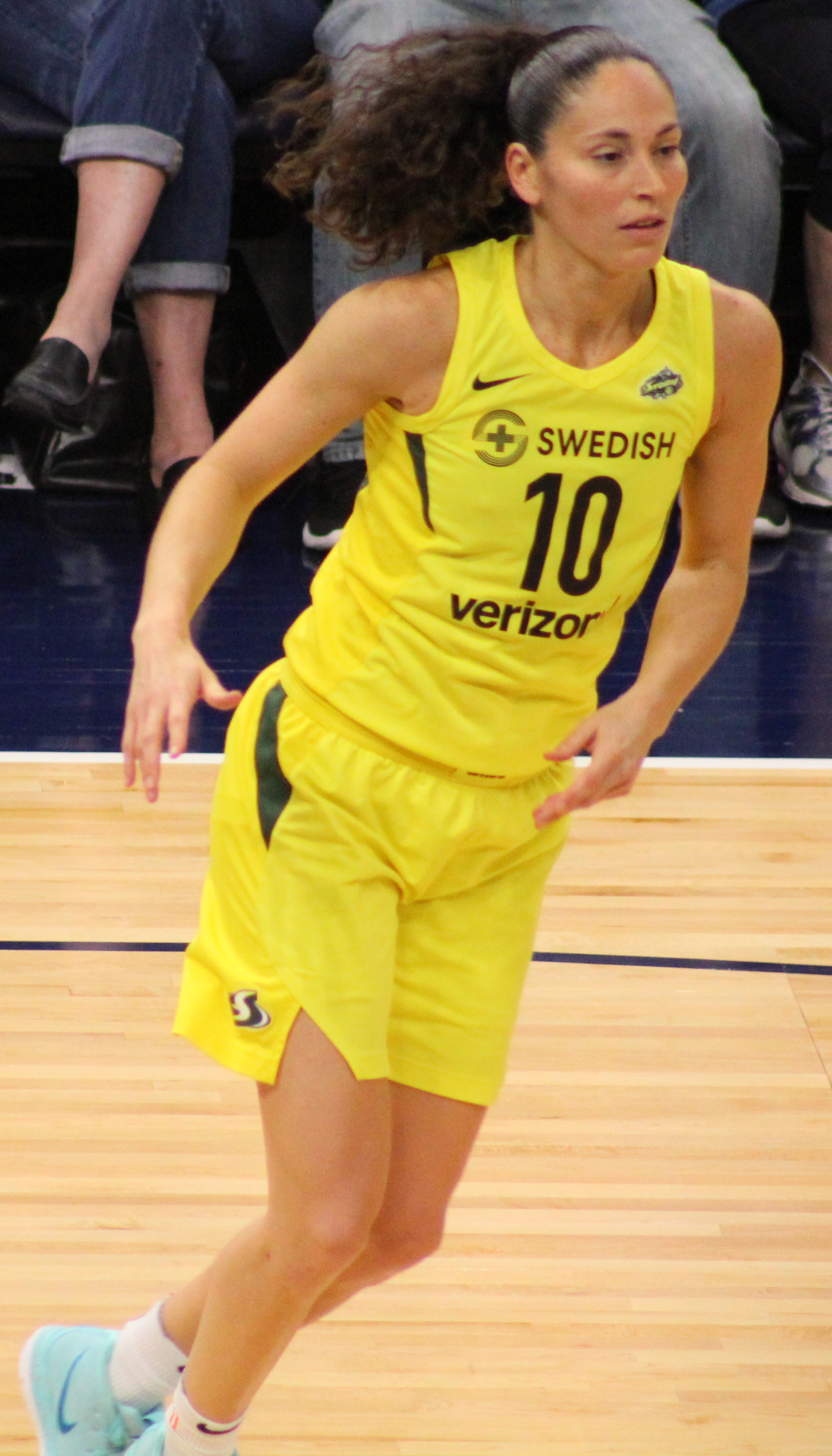
Sue Bird, one of only two basketball players in history to earn five Olympic gold medals, in 2018

Magic Johnson won the National Basketball Association Most Valuable Player Award (MVP) three times in his career, the most for a point guard in NBA history. Stephen Curry and Steve Nash have each been named the league MVP twice. Other NBA point guards with wins include Bob Cousy, Oscar Robertson, Allen Iverson, Derrick Rose, Russell Westbrook, and Shai Gilgeous-Alexander. Since 1969, Johnson and Curry are the only point guards to win the NBA MVP, Finals MVP and All-Star Game MVP awards in their careers. Notable point guards of the WNBA include five-time champion Sue Bird, her Olympic teammate Diana Taurasi (the only two basketball players of either gender to earn five Olympic gold medals for basketball) and Courtney Vandersloot. In the NBA, point guards generally range from 6 ft 2 in (1.88 m) to 6 ft 6 in (1.98 m) whereas in the WNBA, point guards are usually 5 ft 9 in (1.75 m) or shorter. Having above-average size (height, muscle) is considered advantageous, although size is secondary to situational awareness, speed, quickness and ball-handling skills. At 5 ft 3 in (1.60 m) the shortest player in NBA history, Muggsy Bogues played 889 games in a 14-year career as a point guard.

After the opponent scores, it is typically the point guard who brings the ball up the court to begin an offensive play. Passing skills, ball handling and court vision are crucial. Speed is important; a speedy point guard is better able to create separation and space off the dribble, giving themselves room to work. Point guards are often valued more for their assist totals than for their scoring. John Stockton holds the all time NBA record for assists. Another major evaluation factor is the assist-to-turnover ratio, which reflects the decision-making skills of the player. Given the evolved nature of basketball in the modern day, a first-rate point guard is also required to have a reasonably effective jump shot.

=== Offense ===
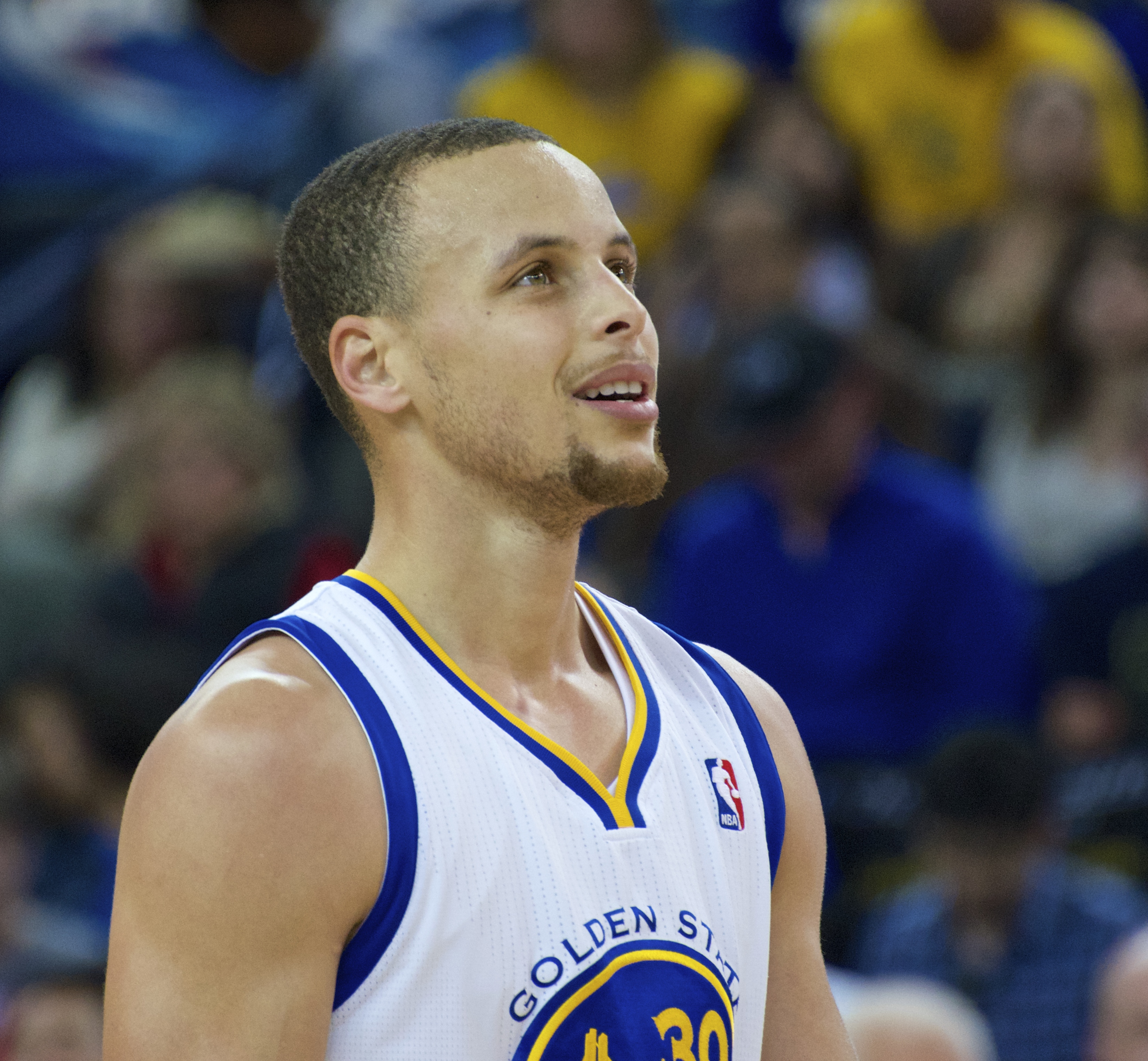
Stephen Curry, regarded as one of the greatest point guards and the greatest shooter in NBA history, in 2014

The point guard is positioned on the perimeter of the play to have the best view of the action, which is crucial because of their leadership obligations. Announcers often refer to the point guard as a "coach on the floor" or a "floor general." These nicknames were particularly true in the past, as several point guards, such as Lenny Wilkens, served their teams as player-coaches. This practice is rare now, as most coaches specialize in their role. Some point guards have great leeway in the offense though they are still extensions of their coach on the floor and must display good leadership skills.

Along with leadership and general basketball acumen, ball-handling is an important skill for a point guard. Generally speaking, the point guard is often the player in possession of the ball and is responsible for maintaining its possession. Point guards must be able to maintain possession of the ball in crowded spaces and be able to advance it quickly. A point guard with enough ball-handling skill and quickness to drive to the basket in a half-court set is also very valuable and considered by some to be a must for a successful offense.

After ball-handling, the most important areas of the game for a point guard are passing and scoring. As the primary decision-maker for a team, a point guard's passing ability determines how well a point guard can put their decision into play. It is one thing to be able to recognize the player that is in a tactically advantageous position. Still, it is another thing entirely to be able to deliver the ball to that player. For this reason, a point guard is usually more skilled and focused on passing than shooting. However, a good jump shot and the ability to score off a drive to the basket are still valuable skills. Point guards often use their scoring ability to augment their effectiveness as decision-makers and playmakers.

In addition to the traditional role of the point guard, modern teams have found new ways to utilize the position. Notably, several modern point guards have used a successful style of post-play, a tactic usually practiced by much larger centers and forwards. Exploiting the fact that the opposing point guard is often an undersized player with limited strength, several modern point guards have developed games close to the basket that include being able to utilize the drop step, spin move and fade-away jump shot.

In recent years, the sport's shift from a fundamental style of play to a more athletic, scoring-oriented game resulted in the proliferation of so-called combo guards at the point guard position. More explosive and athletic point guards focus on scoring instead of play-making, forgoing assists, ball movement and often defense for higher scoring numbers. Young players who are relatively short are now developing the scoring aspects of their skill sets, whereas previously, these players would find it difficult to enter the NBA without true point guard skills. These combo point guards can surprise defenses. Instead of passing after bringing up the ball, they quickly drive to the basket or step back for an outside shot. There are some disadvantages to this style of play. A point guard often controls the offense and who gets the ball, as this type of controlling style of play is necessary to maintain the tempo of a game. Scoring point guards typically look to score first, thus preventing teammates from getting the ball and excluding them from the offense. Even so, combo guards still require above-average passing skills, but not as much as "pure" point guards (in the traditional sense).

=== Defense ===
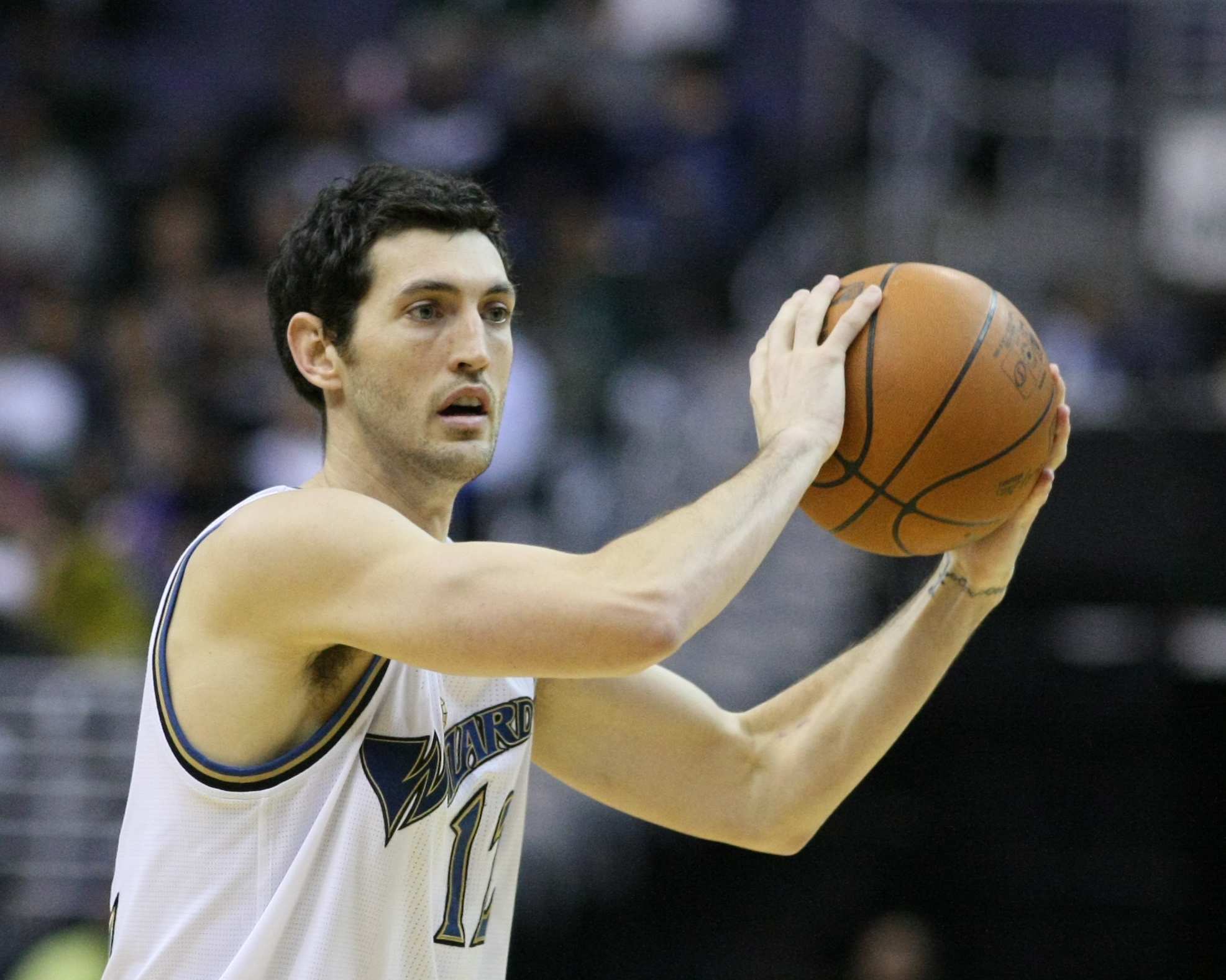
Kirk Hinrich, a former NBA point guard, was known for his lateral quickness and defensive prowess against the pick and roll. His no. 10 jersey is retired by the Kansas Jayhawks.

A defensive point guard is someone who is exceptionally good at defense; their goal is to preclude the opposing point guard from scoring. A defensive point guard will try to accomplish this with constant pressure on the ball, making it difficult to maintain possession by forcing turnovers. A defensive point guard will also pressure opponents in passing lanes to generate steals and scoring opportunities for their team. One of the most notable defensive point guards in NBA history is Kirk Hinrich, whose lateral quickness and defensive prowess against the pick and roll became a valuable team asset. The Kansas Jayhawks' 2002 and 2003 Final Four appearances in the NCAA Division I tournament is partly credited to Hinrich's defensive skill set. Hinrich led the Jayhawks to runner-up in the 2003 National Championship game and was drafted by the Chicago Bulls in the storied 2003 NBA draft and had a productive NBA career. In an episode of the Matt Barnes and Stephen Jackson podcast All The Smoke, guest Dwyane Wade spoke of his experience playing Hinrich:

I never feel like I hated no one guarding me. For me, it was always a different challenge, and I'm saying some guys have played me very well. I mean, a guy like Kirk Hinrich has played me very well.

— Dwyane Wade, 2019

Other examples of defensive point guards include Jrue Holiday, whose defensive aggression against Chris Paul and Devin Booker helped the Milwaukee Bucks win the 2021 NBA Finals. Marcus Smart, then a point guard for the Boston Celtics, won NBA Defensive Player of the Year in 2022.

Other NBA point guards known for their defensive prowess include Gary Payton, Chris Paul, Patrick Beverley, Alex Caruso, Mike Conley Jr.

== See also ==
- Bob Cousy Award – An annual award given to the nation's top NCAA male point guard
- Nancy Lieberman Award – The counterpart to the Cousy Award; given to the top NCAA female point guard
- Point forward – when a forward assumes the point guard duties
