= Screen (sports) =

Blocking move in team sports

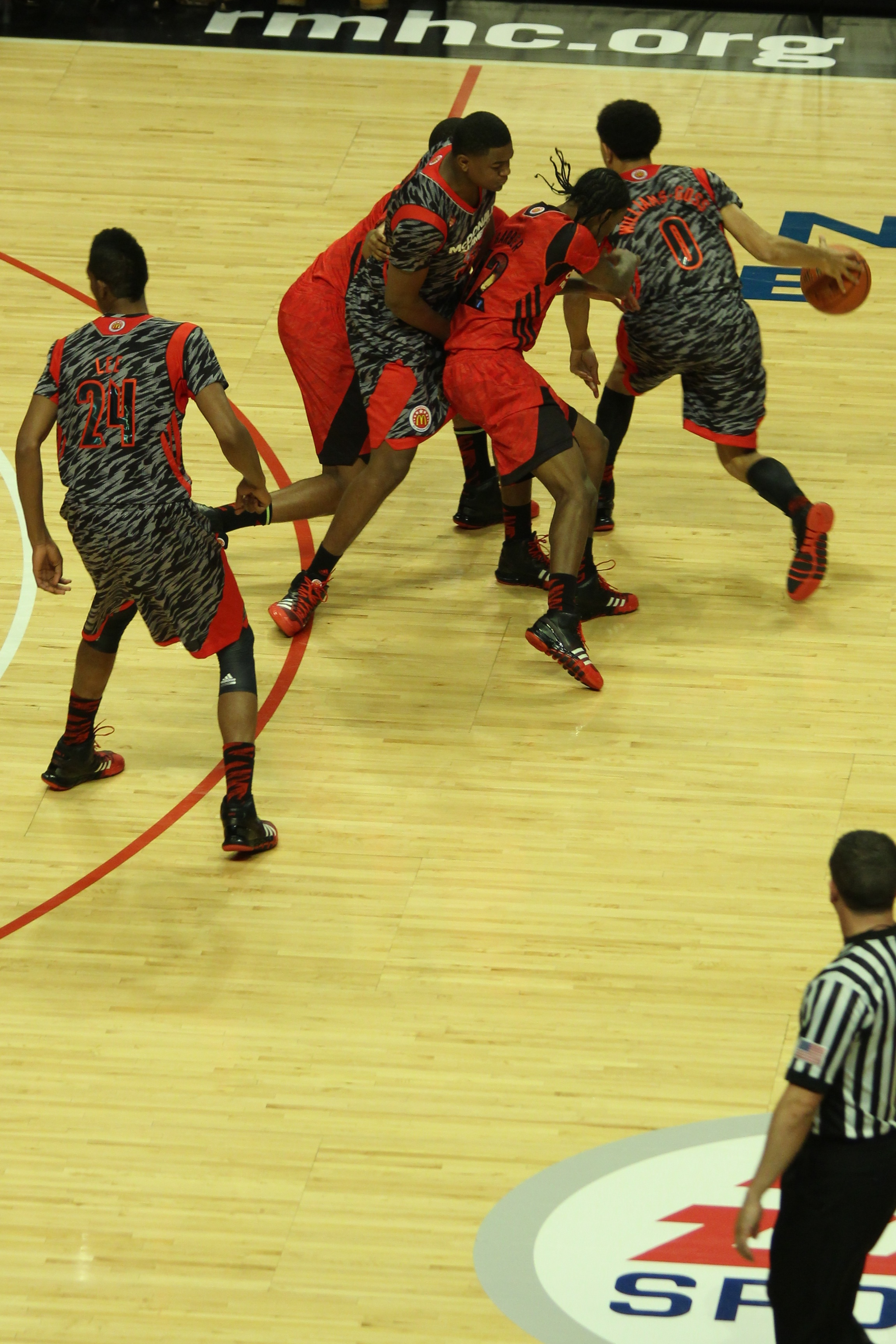
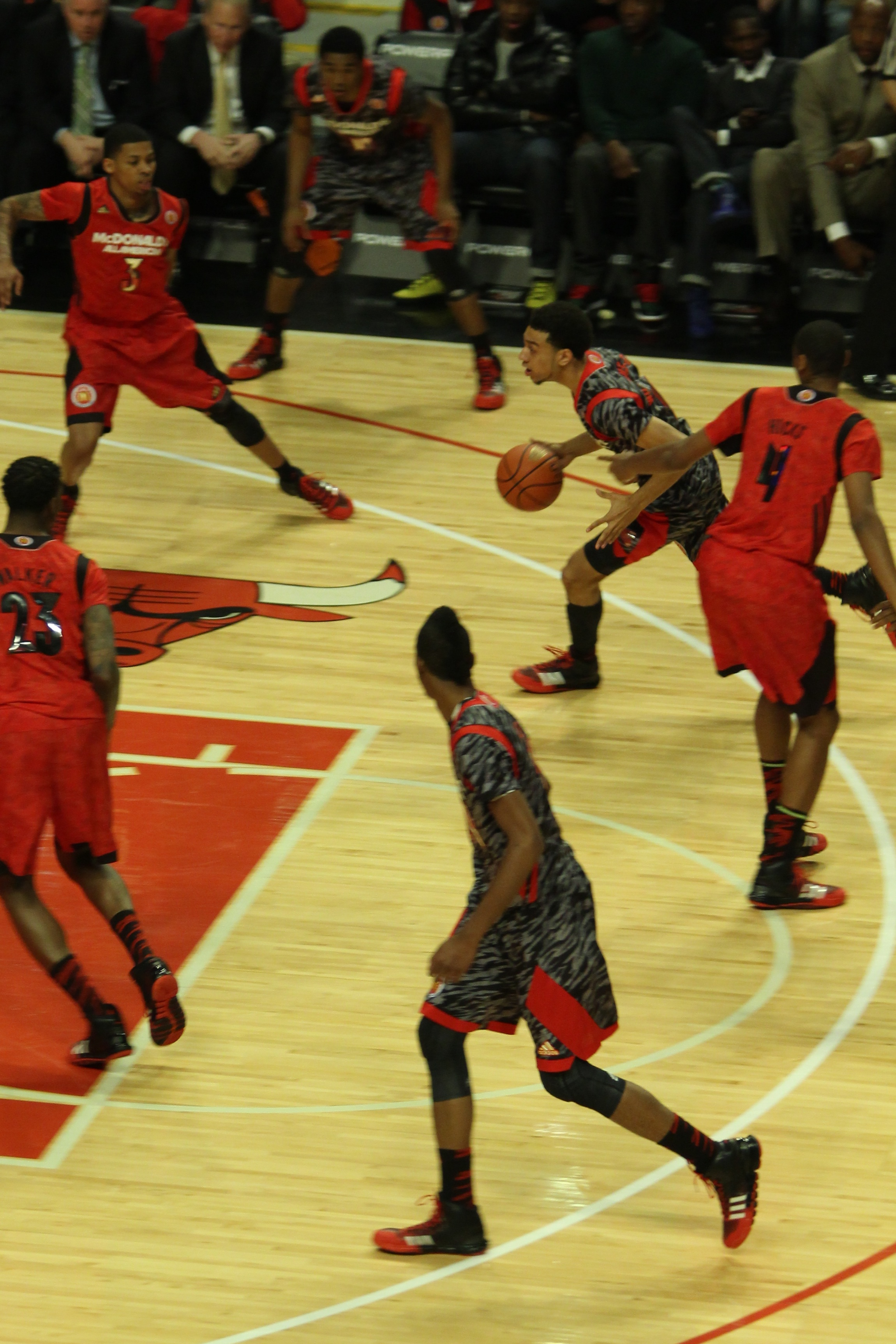
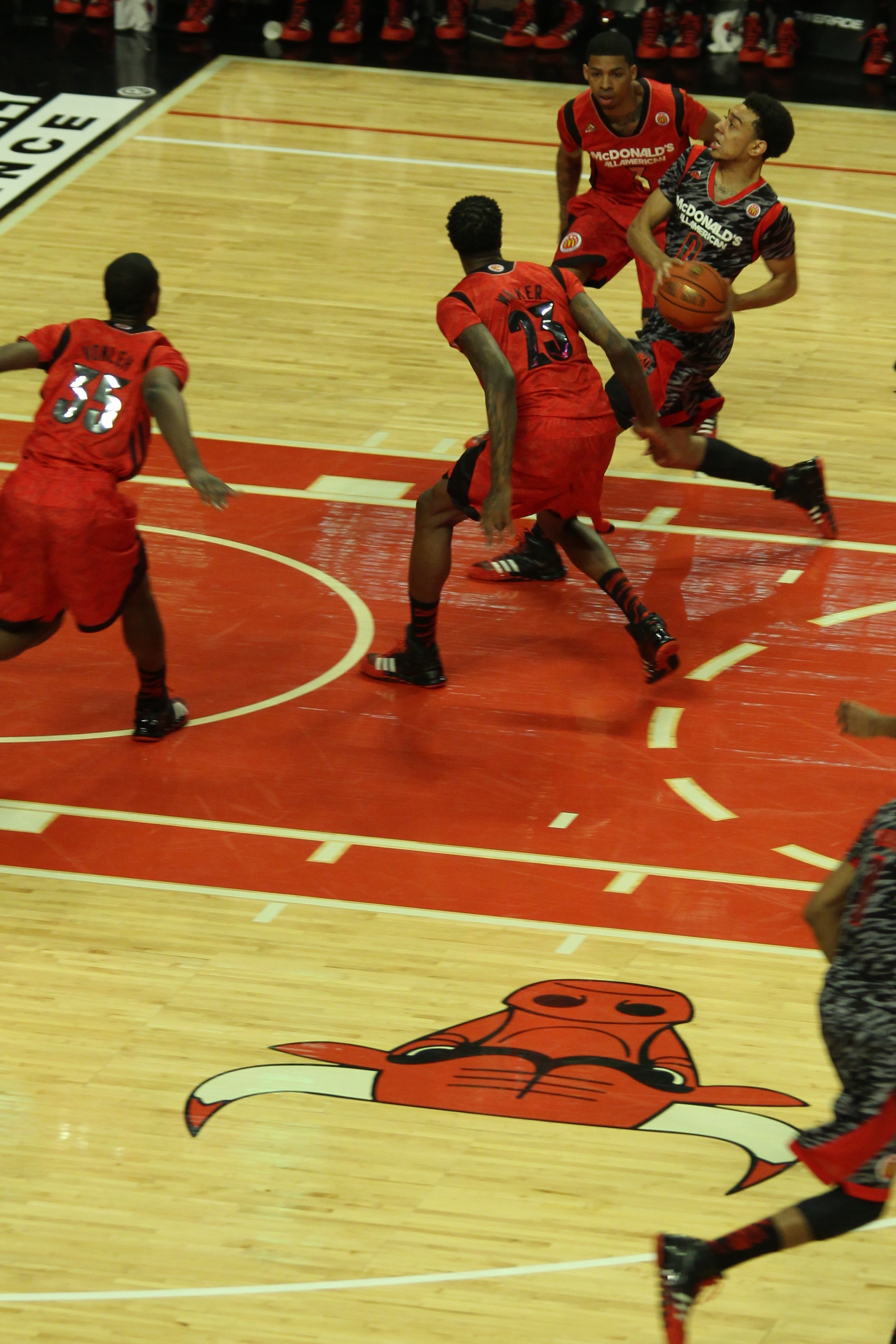
After Jarell Martin sets a pick on Cat Barber for Nigel Williams-Goss, that breaks Williams-Goss free for a drive down the lane at the 2013 McDonald's All-American Boys Game

A screen in ball sports is a blocking move by an offensive player in which they stand beside or behind a defender in order to free up a teammate to shoot, pass, or drive the ball in to score. In basketball and field lacrosse, it is also known as a pick. Screens can be on-ball (when set for the ball-handler), or off-ball (when set for a teammate moving without the ball to get open for a pass). The two offensive players involved in setting the screen are known as the screener (who blocks the defender) and the cutter (who gets free from the defender).

Successfully "setting a screen" in team sports such as basketball and water polo requires attention to position and timing. An offensive player will first establish position so that a teammate can move toward them. The teammate changes pace and direction, and cuts (moves or dribbles quickly) very close to the screening player. The defender who is covering the cutter will have to push into the screening player, or divert around, losing a few steps. In basketball and lacrosse, the offensive player setting the pick must remain stationary at the moment of contact with the defender, and allow the defensive player a "reasonable opportunity" to avoid the screen; a screen is illegal if the screener moves in order to make contact, and obtains an advantage; the result is an offensive foul in basketball and a technical foul in lacrosse. There must be illegal contact for a moving screen to be a foul; no illegal contact, no foul, no matter how much moving the screener does. If the screener holds, leans or moves into the defender to cause contact, this will result in a foul on the screener.

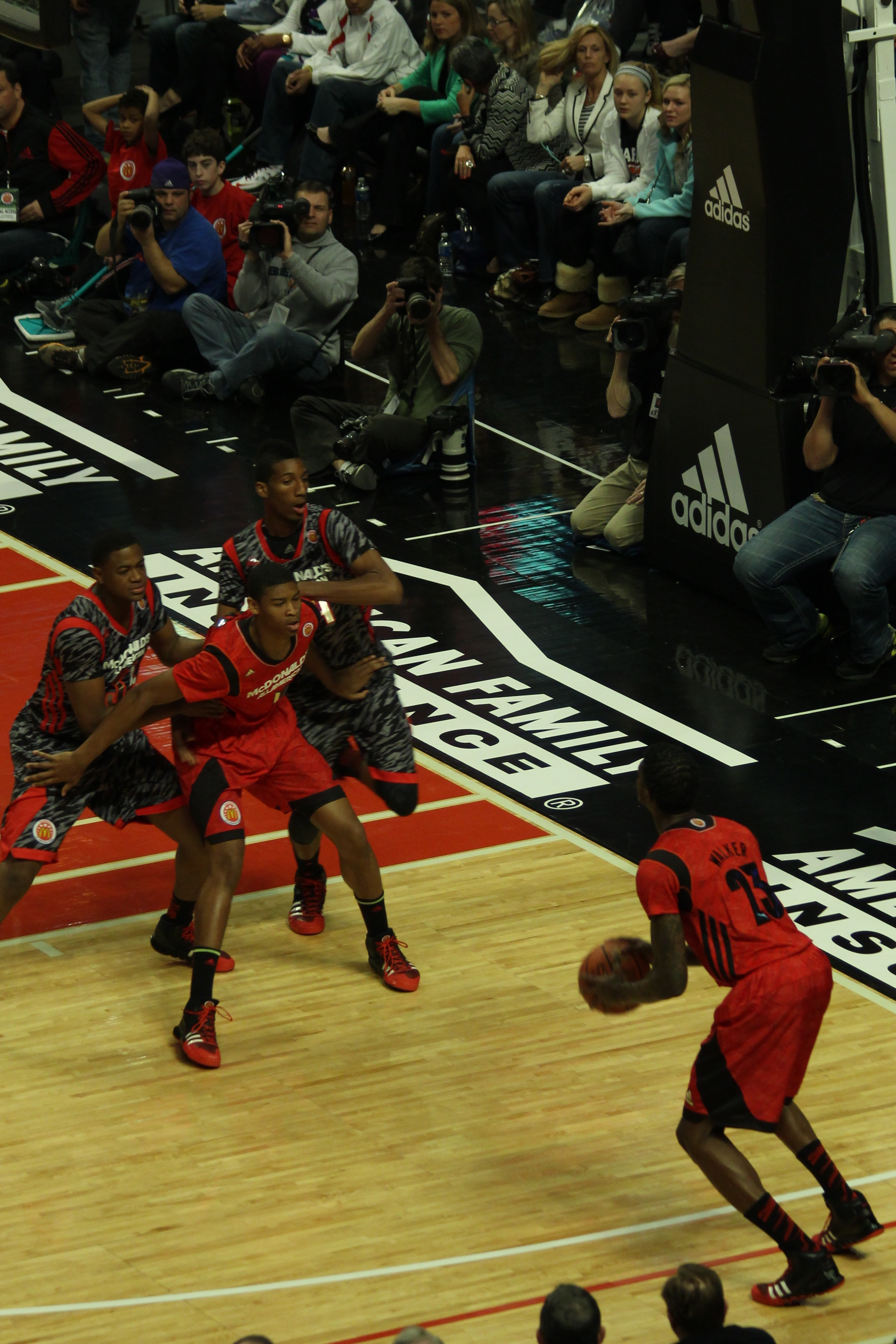
Isaiah Hicks screens Jarell Martin and Marcus Lee for Chris Walker at the 2013 McDonald's All-American Boys Game.

After setting the screen, the screener is often open to roll to the basket and receive a pass. This tactic is called pick and roll in basketball. Another basketball tactic, called the pick and pop, is for the ballhandler to drive to the basket while the screener squares for a jumpshot.

Defensive moves to defeat a screen include sliding by the pick if the screening player leaves space, fighting over the screen (pushing the screener away, where allowed—this is not allowed in basketball), if the defender is strong enough, or switching defensive assignments with another defender, who can pick up the cutter on the other side of the screen.

In the team sport ultimate, setting a screen is not allowed. The screened player can call "pick", whereupon the play stops with all other players holding their current positions. The screened player returns to defend the offensive player he or she was defending and then play continues.

== See also ==
- Screen pass
- Pick and roll
- Basketball techniques
- Glossary of basketball terms
- Glossary of water polo
