= Outline of sports =

The following outline is provided as an overview of and topical guide to sports:

== What is a sport? ==
A sport is a physical activity or game, often competitive and organised, that maintains or improves physical ability and skills. Sport may provide enjoyment to participants and entertainment to spectators. The number of participants in a particular sport can vary from hundreds of people to a single individual. Sports can be described as all of the following:

- Entertainment – Any sport that includes spectators, either free or paid admission, with no pre-scripted plot of the outcome. The athletics might also get entertained by complete sports objective.
- Exercise – some sports are physical exercise while others are mental exercise.
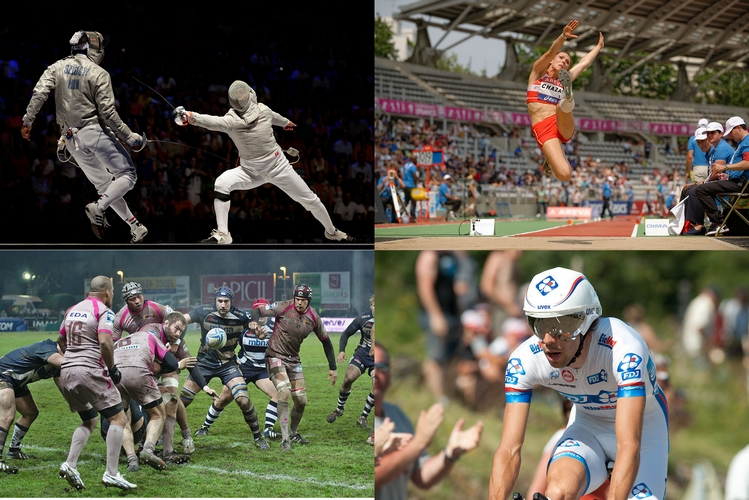

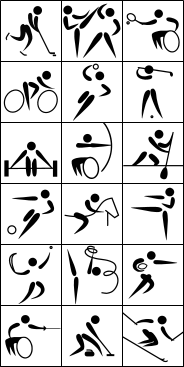

== Types of sports ==
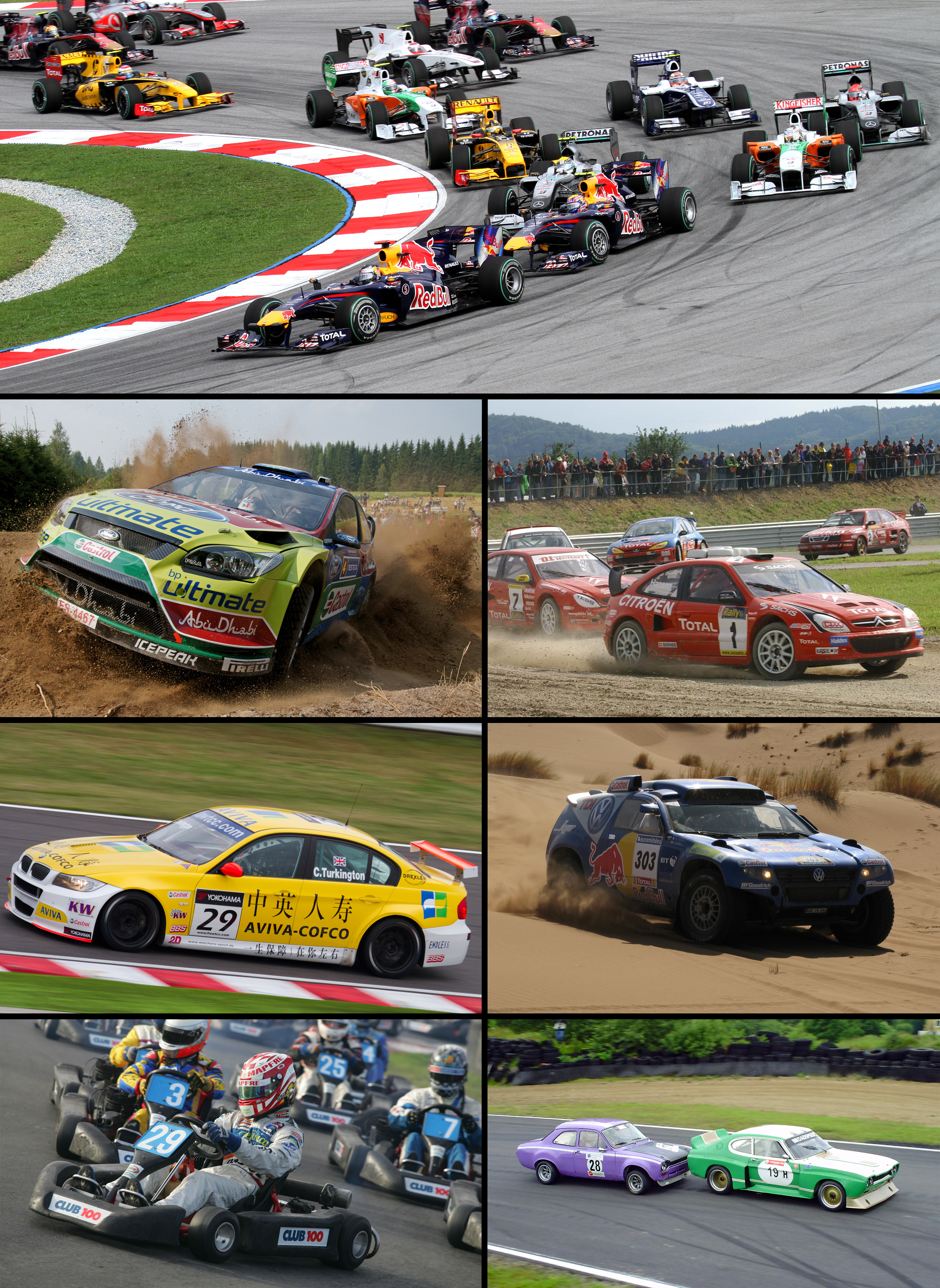
Auto racing sports

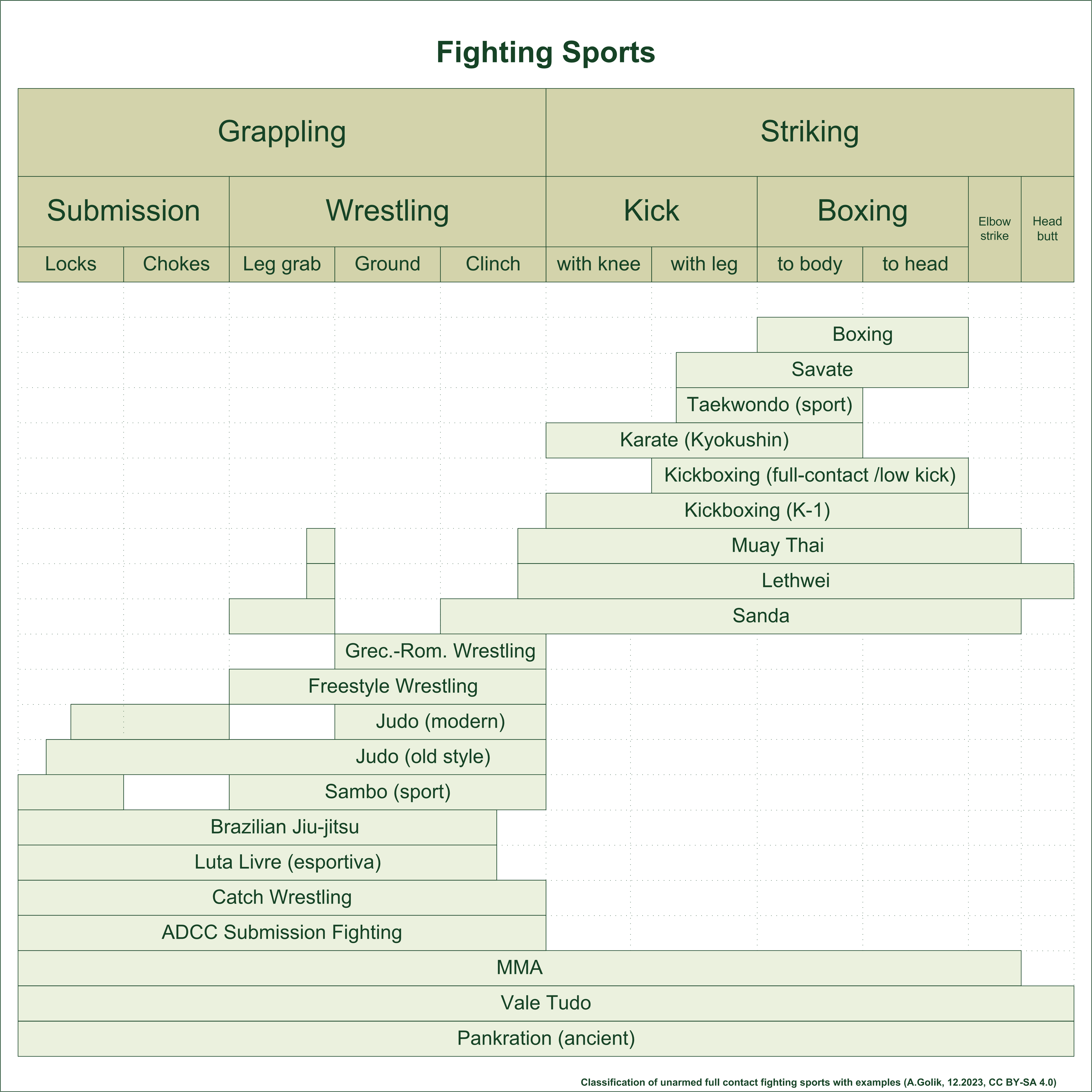
Classification of unarmed martial arts

Selection of roller sports
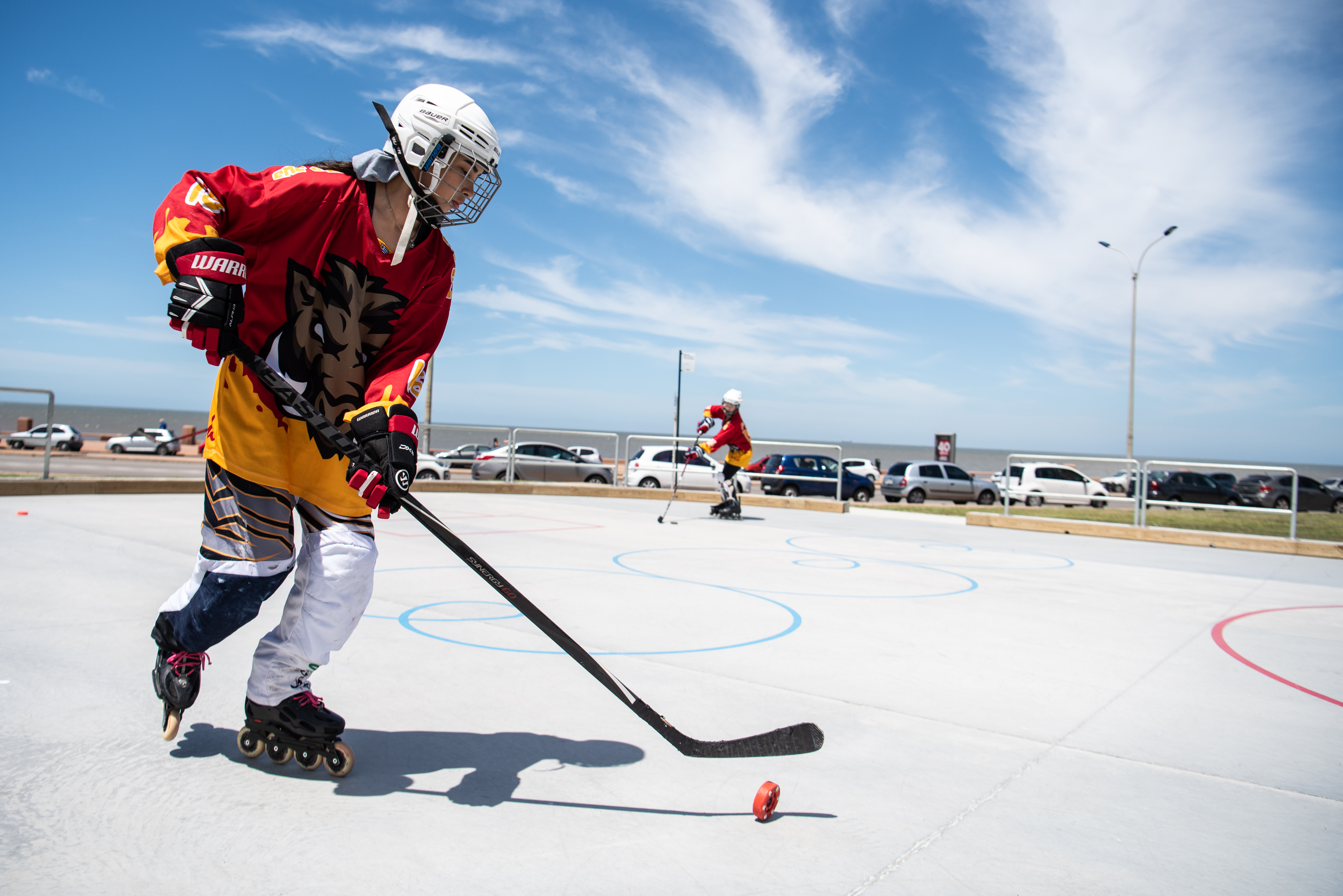
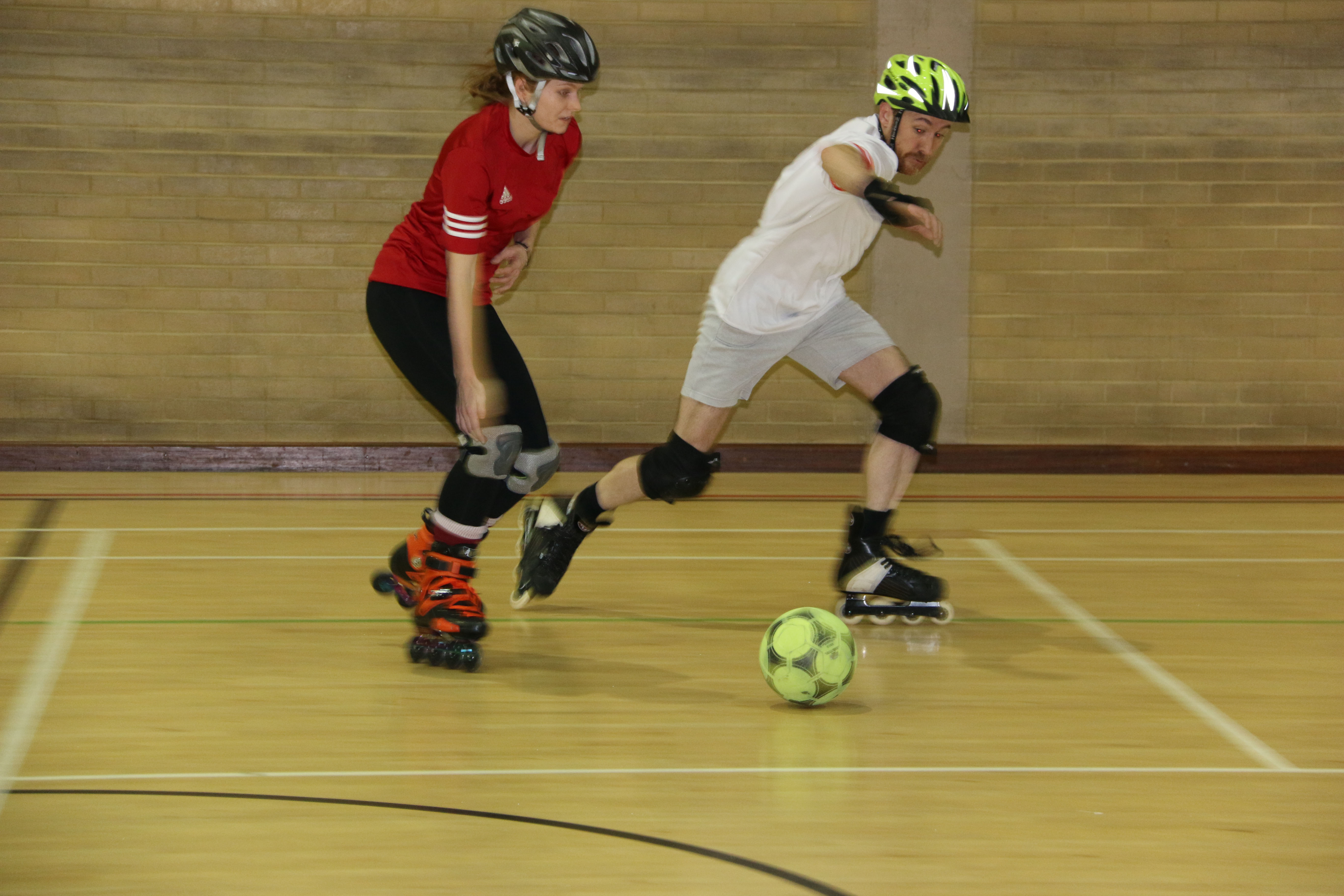
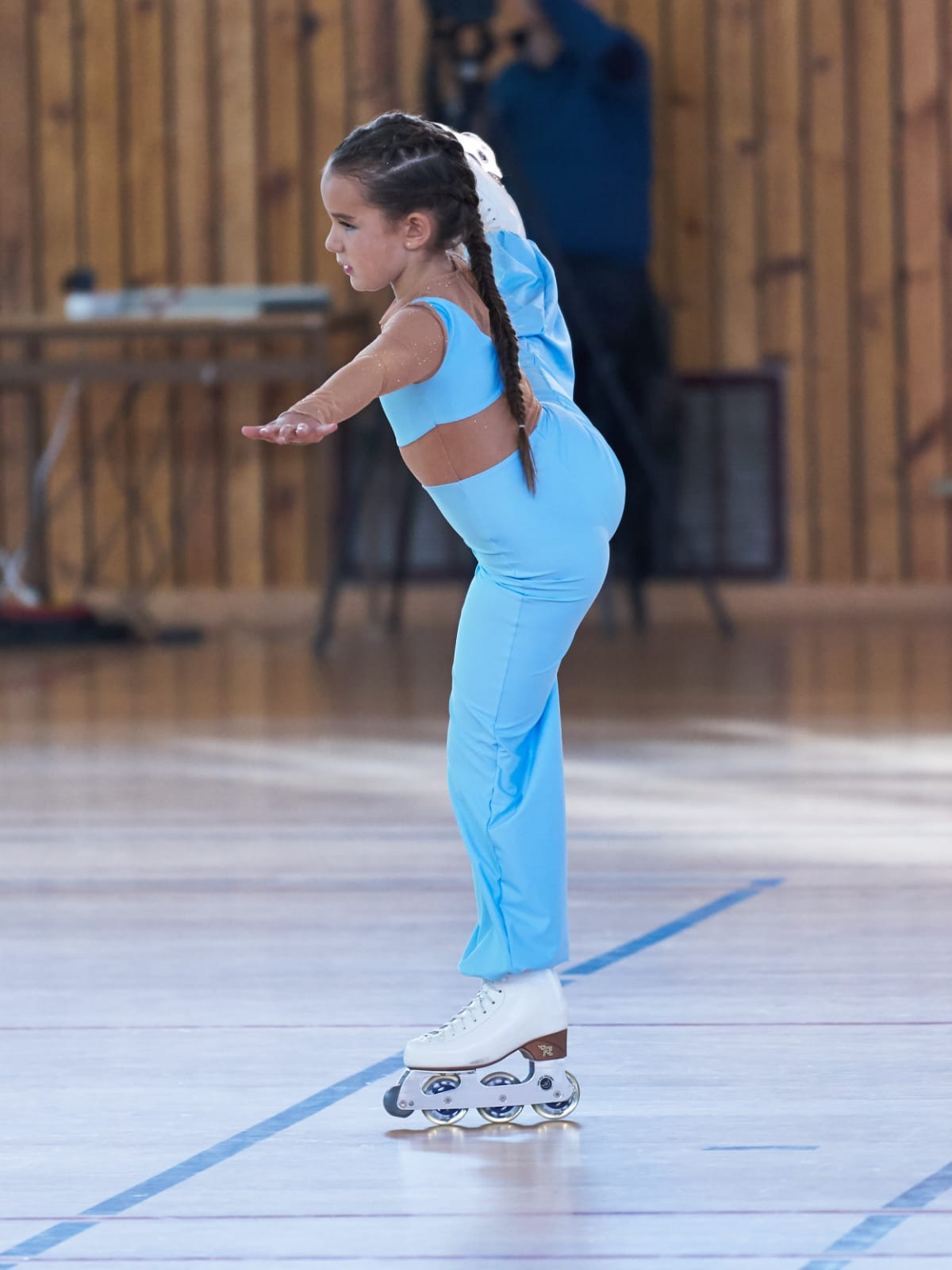
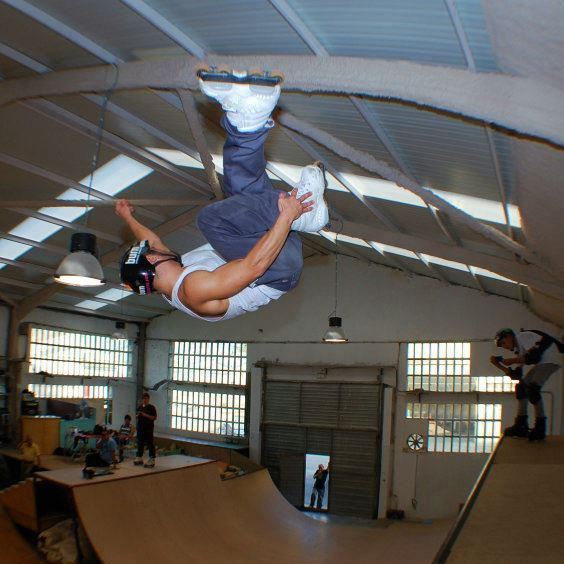
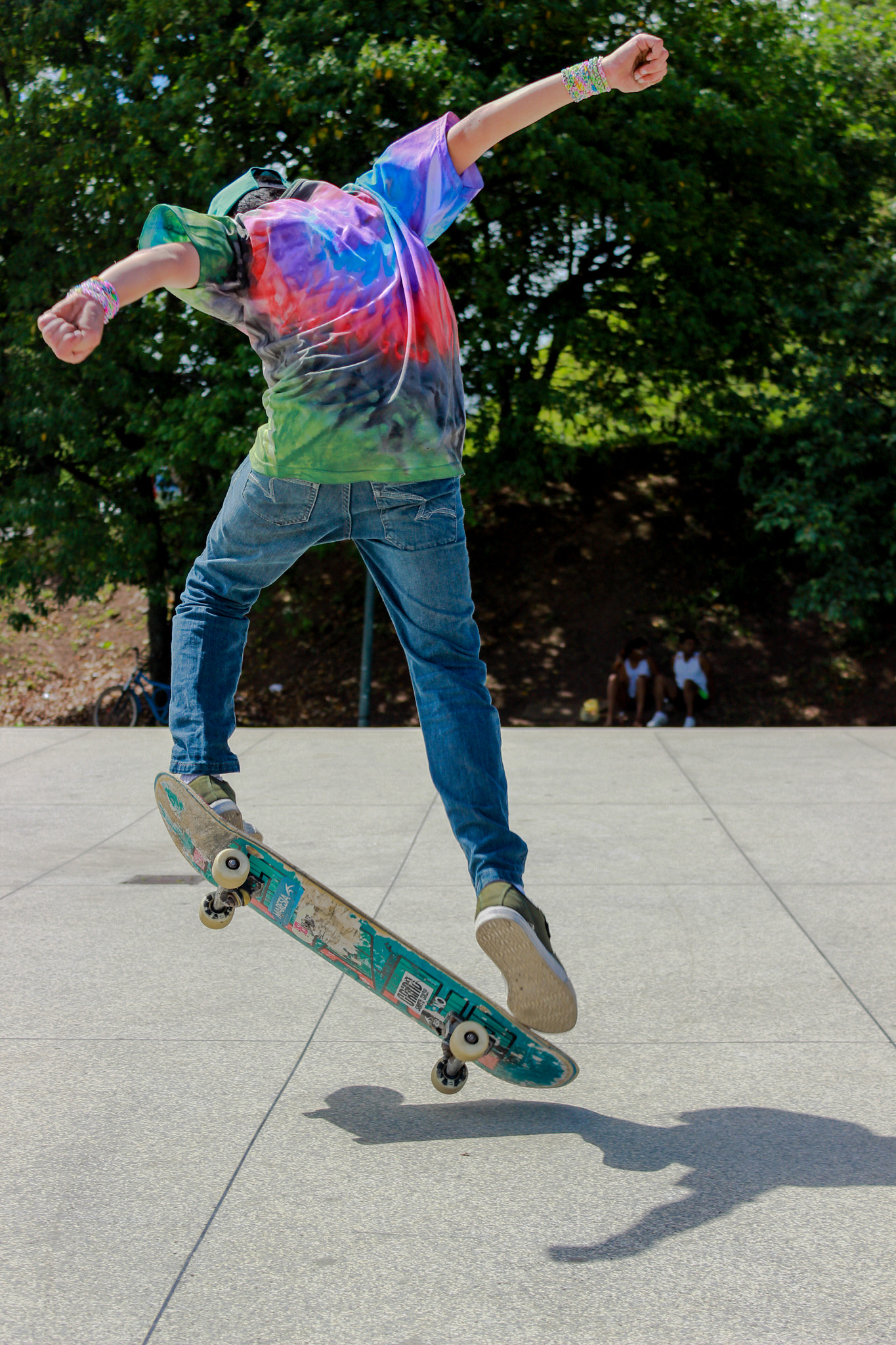
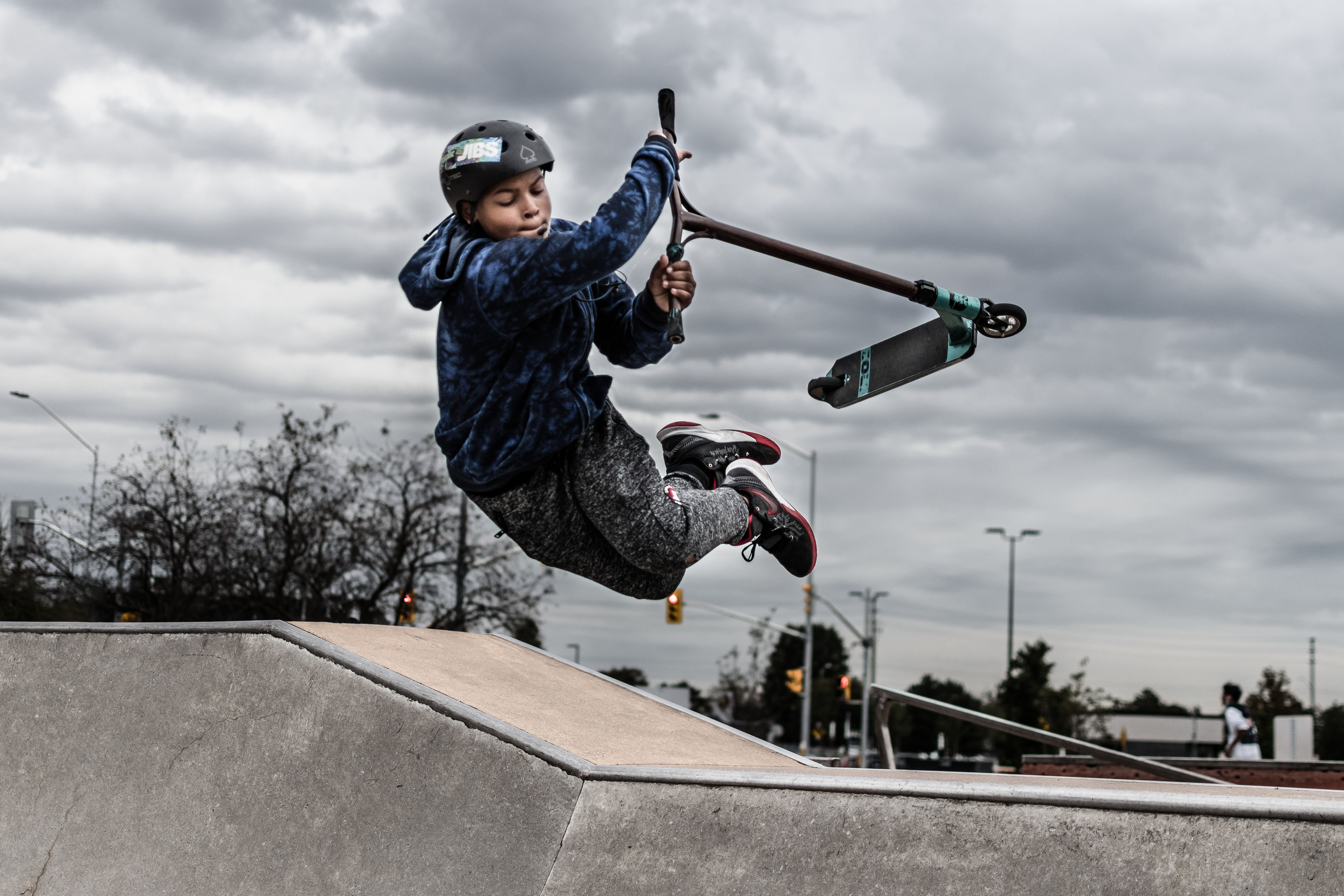
- Athletic sports
- Ball sports
  - Bat-and-ball games
  - Cue sports
  - Ground billiards
  - Boules
  - Football codes
  - Hockey variations
  - Lacrosse family
  - Net and wall games
  - Gaelic games
- Blood sports
- Boardsport
- Combat sports
  - Martial arts
    - Chinese martial arts
      - Styles of Chinese martial arts
    - Japanese martial arts
      - Budō
    - Korean martial arts
    - Indian martial arts
    - Bangladeshi martial arts
    - Mainland Southeast Asia martial arts
      - Vietnamese martial arts
    - Filipino martial arts
    - Indonesian martial arts
    - Irish martial arts
    - Italian martial arts
    - Russian martial arts
- Company sports
- Contact sport
- Cycle sport
- Electronic sports
- Extreme sports
- Frisbee sports
- Gymnastics
- Illegal sports
- Military sports
- Mind sport
- Motorsports
  - Auto racing
  - Motorcycle sport
- New sports
- Pole sports
- Racing
  - Multisport race
- Roller sports
- Shooting sports
- Spectator sport
- Tabletop sports
- Throwing sports
- Winter sports
- By location
  - Air sports
  - Field sports
  - Lawn game
  - Mountain sport
  - Mud sports
  - Underwater sports
- By origin
  - Traditional sports and games
    - Ethnosport
  - Western sports
- By number of participants
  - Individual sport
  - Team sport
- By demography
  - Women's sports
  - Mixed-sex sports
    - Mixed doubles
  - Parasports
  - Youth sports
  - Animal sport
- By retribution
  - Amateur sports
  - Professional sports
  - Semi-professional sports
  - Pro–am
- Simulation of sports
  - Sports video game
  - Fantasy sport
- Multisport events
  - Olympic sports
  - World Games sports
  - Commonwealth Games sports
  - African Games sports
  - Asian Games sports
  - Pan American Games sports
  - Demonstration sport

=== List of sports ===
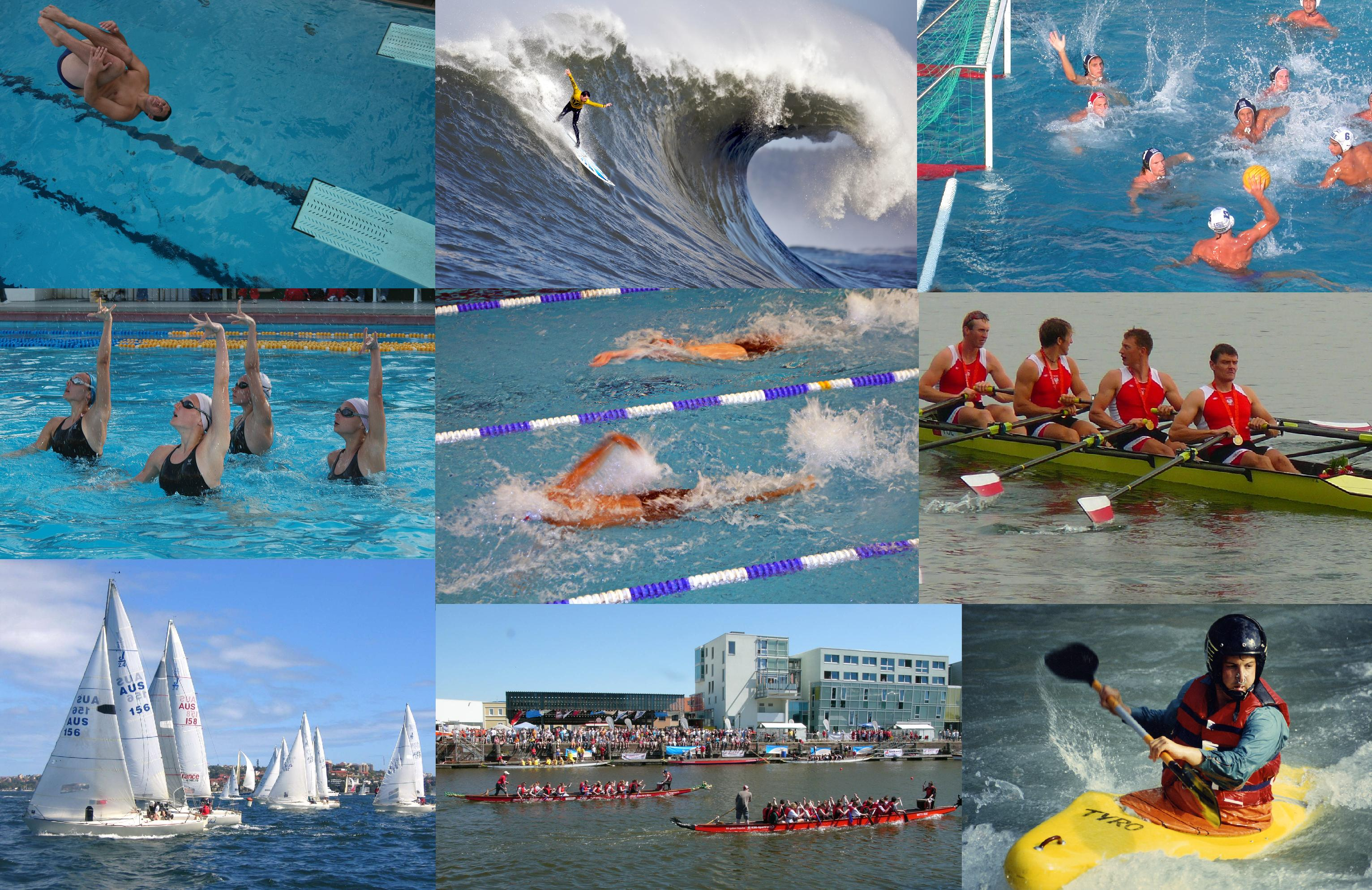
Examples of water sports

- List of acrobatic activities
- List of ball games
  - List of types of football
  - List of racket sports
- List of beach sports
- List of DanceSport dances
- List of dog sports
- List of equestrian sports
- List of hybrid sports
- List of martial arts
  - List of Chinese martial arts
  - List of Japanese martial arts
  - Styles of wrestling
- List of stick sports
- List of forms of racing
- List of water sports
- List of rural sports and games

== Geography of sport ==
- Geography of chess
- Football codes
  - Geography of association football
    - Geography of women's association football
  - Geography of Australian rules football
  - Geography of rugby league
- Geography of kendo
- Geography of netball
- Geography of water polo

=== Sport by region ===
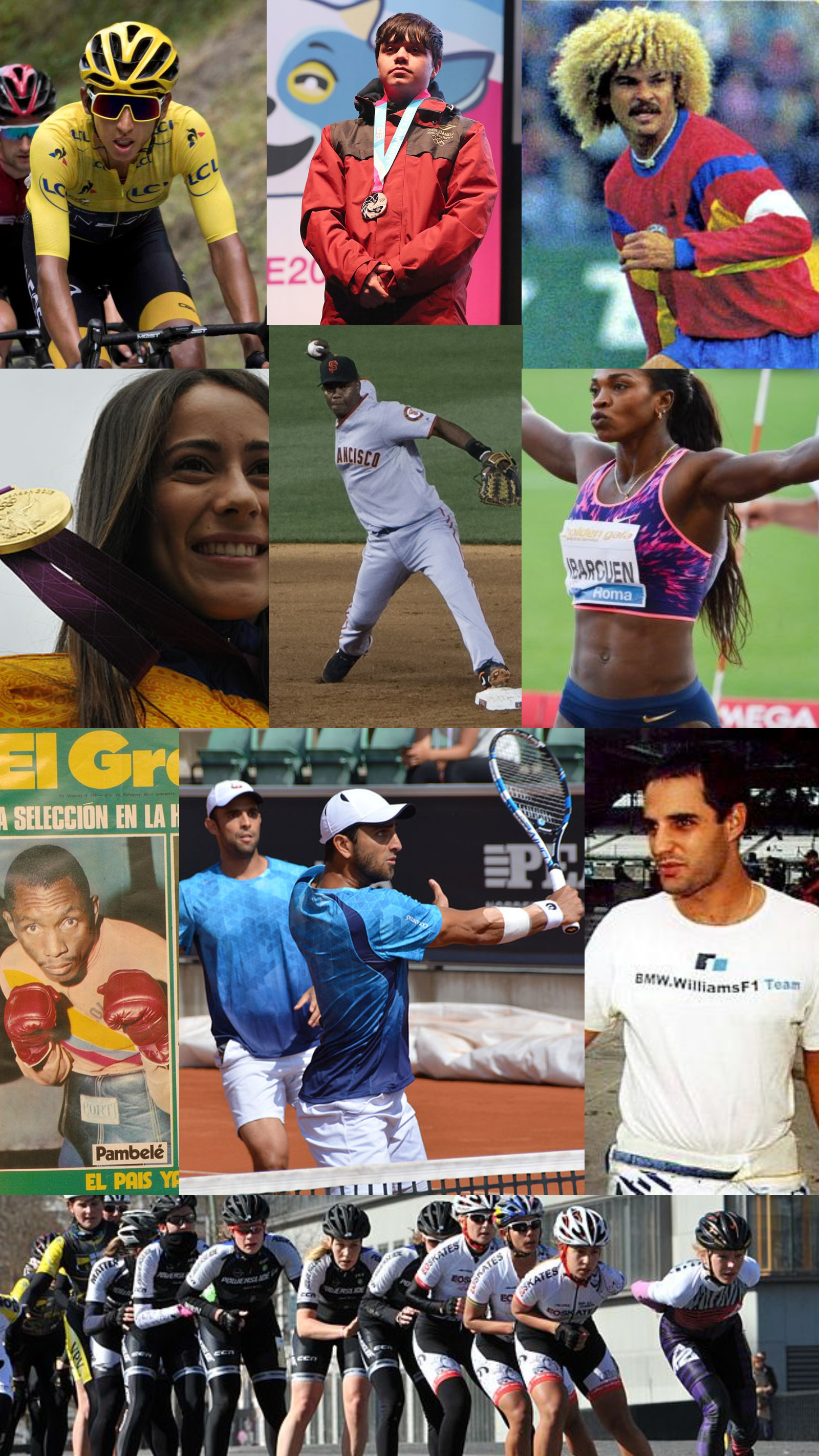
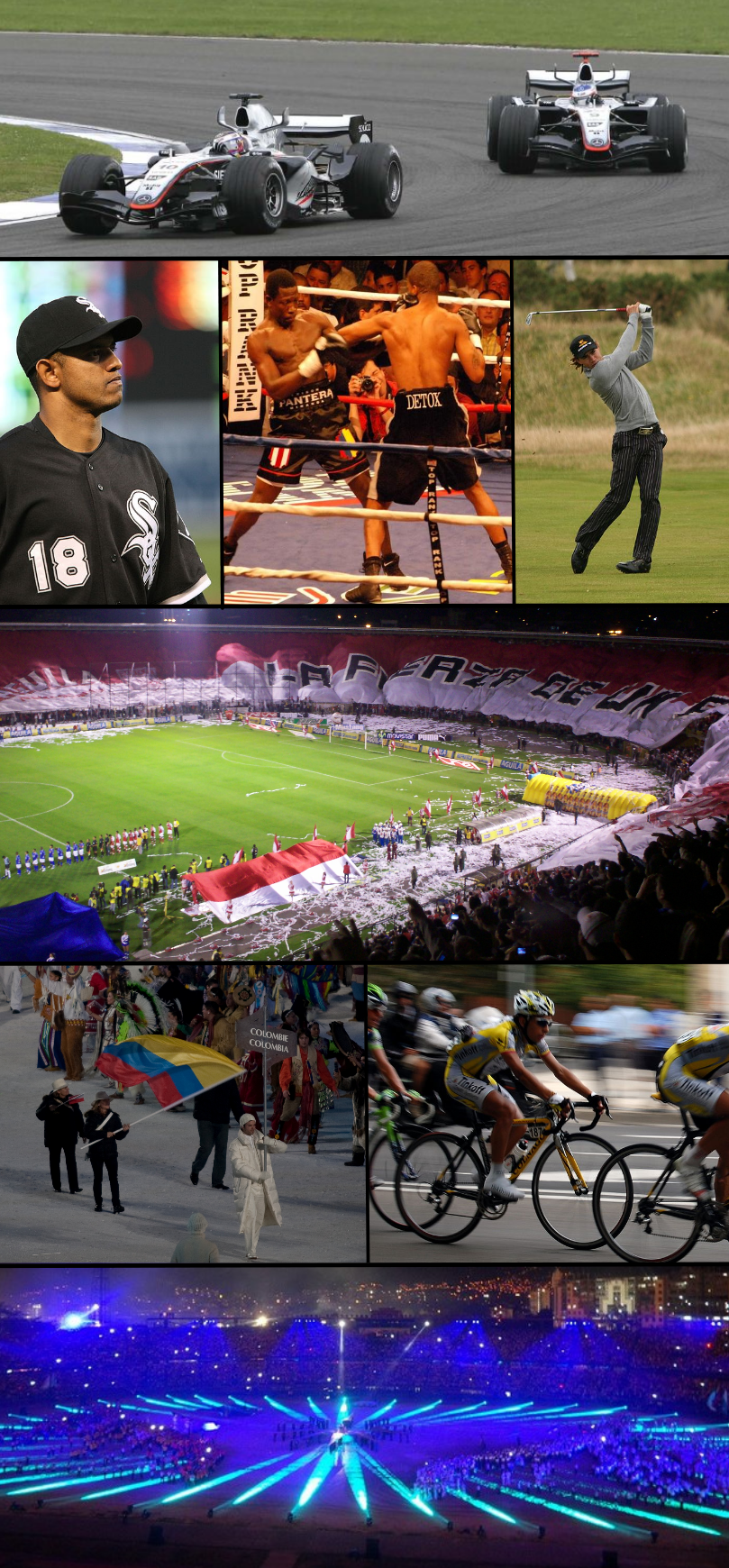
Sport in Colombia

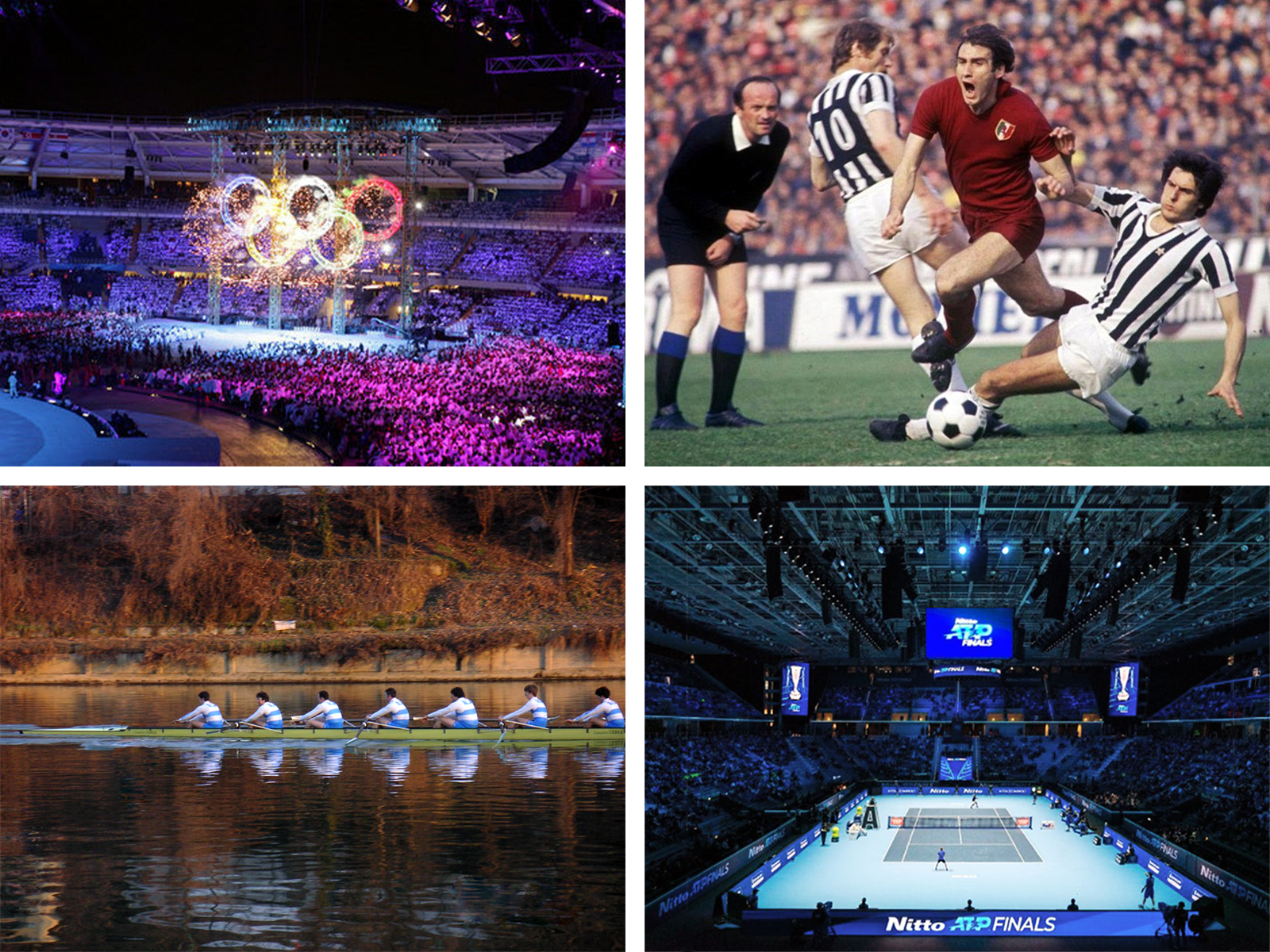
Sport in Italy

Africa

West Africa

Benin • Burkina Faso • Cape Verde • Côte d'Ivoire • Gambia • Ghana • Guinea • Guinea-Bissau • Liberia • Mali • Mauritania • Niger • Nigeria • Senegal • Sierra Leone • Togo

North Africa

Algeria • Egypt • Libya • Mauritania • Morocco • Sudan • Tunisia • Western Sahara

Central Africa

Angola • Burundi • Cameroon • Central African Republic • Chad • The Democratic Republic of the Congo • Equatorial Guinea • Gabon • Republic of the Congo • Rwanda • São Tomé and Príncipe

East Africa

Burundi • Comoros • Djibouti • Eritrea • Ethiopia • Kenya • Madagascar • Malawi • Mauritius • Mozambique • Rwanda • Seychelles • Somalia • Tanzania • Uganda • Zambia • Zimbabwe

Southern Africa

Botswana • Eswatini • Lesotho • Namibia • South Africa

Dependencies

Mayotte (France) • St. Helena (UK) • Puntland • Somaliland • Sahrawi Arab Democratic Republic

Antarctica
Asia
Central Asia

Kazakhstan • Kyrgyzstan • Tajikistan • Turkmenistan • Uzbekistan

East Asia

China

Tibet
Hong Kong • Macau

Japan • North Korea • South Korea • Mongolia • Taiwan

North Asia

Russia

Southeast Asia

Brunei • Burma (Myanmar) • Cambodia • East Timor (Timor-Leste) • Indonesia • Laos • Malaysia • Philippines • Singapore • Thailand • Vietnam

South Asia

Afghanistan • Bangladesh • Bhutan• Iran • Maldives • Nepal • Pakistan • Sri Lanka

India

Andhra Pradesh • Bihar • Delhi • Gujarat • Jammu and Kashmir • KarnatakaKerala • Madhya Pradesh • Maharashtra • Manipur • Mizoram • Odisha • Punjab • Tamil Nadu • West Bengal

West Asia

Armenia • Azerbaijan • Bahrain • Cyprus (including disputed Northern Cyprus) • Georgia • Iraq • Israel • Jordan • Kuwait • Lebanon • Oman • Palestine • Qatar • Saudi Arabia • Syria • Turkey • United Arab Emirates • Yemen

Caucasus (a region considered to be in both Asia and Europe, or between them)

North Caucasus

Parts of Russia (Chechnya, Ingushetia, Dagestan, Adyghea, Kabardino-Balkaria, Karachay–Cherkessia, North Ossetia, Krasnodar Krai, Stavropol Krai)

South Caucasus

Georgia (including disputed Abkhazia, South Ossetia) • Armenia • Azerbaijan (including disputed Nagorno-Karabakh Republic)

Europe

Akrotiri and Dhekelia • Åland • Albania • Andorra • Armenia • Austria • Azerbaijan • Belarus • Belgium • Bosnia and Herzegovina • Bulgaria • Croatia • Cyprus • Czech Republic • Denmark • Estonia • Faroe Islands • Finland • France • Georgia • Germany • Gibraltar • Greece • Guernsey • Hungary • Iceland • Ireland • Isle of Man • Italy • Jersey • Kazakhstan • Kosovo • Latvia • Liechtenstein • Lithuania • Luxembourg • Macedonia • Malta • Moldova (including disputed Transnistria) • Monaco • Montenegro • Netherlands • Norway • Poland • Portugal • Romania • Russia • San Marino • Serbia • Slovakia • Slovenia • Spain • Svalbard • Sweden • Switzerland • Turkey • Ukraine
United Kingdom

England (Birmingham, Bristol, Cornwall, London, Milton Keynes, Sussex, Worthing) • Northern Ireland (Belfast) • Scotland (Glasgow) • Wales (Cardiff)

Vatican City
European Union

North America

Canada
Mexico
United States

Alabama • Alaska • Arizona • Arkansas • California • Colorado • Connecticut • Delaware • Florida • Georgia • Hawaii • Idaho • Illinois • Indiana • Iowa • Montana • Kansas • Kentucky • Louisiana • Maine • Maryland • Massachusetts • Michigan • Minnesota • Mississippi • Missouri • Nebraska • Nevada • New Hampshire • New Jersey • New Mexico • New York • North Carolina • North Dakota • Ohio • Oklahoma • Oregon • Pennsylvania • Rhode Island • South Carolina • South Dakota • Tennessee • Texas • Utah • Vermont • Virginia • Washington • West Virginia • Wisconsin • Wyoming
District of Columbia (Washington, D.C.)

Dependencies

Greenland• Saint Pierre and Miquelon

Central America

Belize • Costa Rica • El Salvador • Guatemala • Honduras • Nicaragua • Panama

Caribbean

Anguilla • Antigua and Barbuda • Aruba • Bahamas • Barbados • Bermuda • British Virgin Islands • Cayman Islands • Cuba • Dominica • Dominican Republic • Grenada • Haiti • Jamaica • Montserrat • Netherlands Antilles • Puerto Rico • Saint Barthélemy • Saint Kitts and Nevis • Saint Lucia • Saint Martin • Saint Vincent and the Grenadines • Trinidad and Tobago • Turks and Caicos Islands • United States Virgin Islands

Oceania (includes the continent of Australia)
Australasia

Australia
ATC • New South Wales • (Sydney) • Northern Territory • Queensland (Brisbane) • South Australia • Tasmania • Victoria • Western Australia

Dependencies/Territories of Australia

Christmas Island • Cocos (Keeling) Islands • Norfolk Island

New Zealand

Melanesia

Fiji • Indonesia (Oceanian part only) • New Caledonia (France) • Papua New Guinea • Solomon Islands • Vanuatu •

Micronesia

Federated States of Micronesia • Guam (US) • Kiribati • Marshall Islands • Nauru • Northern Mariana Islands (USA) • Palau • Wake Island (USA) •

Polynesia

American Samoa (USA) • Chatham Islands (NZ) • Cook Islands (NZ) • Easter Island (Chile) • French Polynesia (France) • Hawaii (USA) • Loyalty Islands (France) • Niue (NZ) • Pitcairn Islands (UK) • Adamstown • Samoa • Tokelau (NZ) • Tonga • Tuvalu • Wallis and Futuna (France)

South America

Argentina • Bolivia • Brazil • Chile • Colombia • Ecuador • Falkland Islands • Guyana • Paraguay • Peru • Suriname • Uruguay • Venezuela

South Atlantic

Ascension Island • Saint Helena • Tristan da Cunha

== History of sports ==
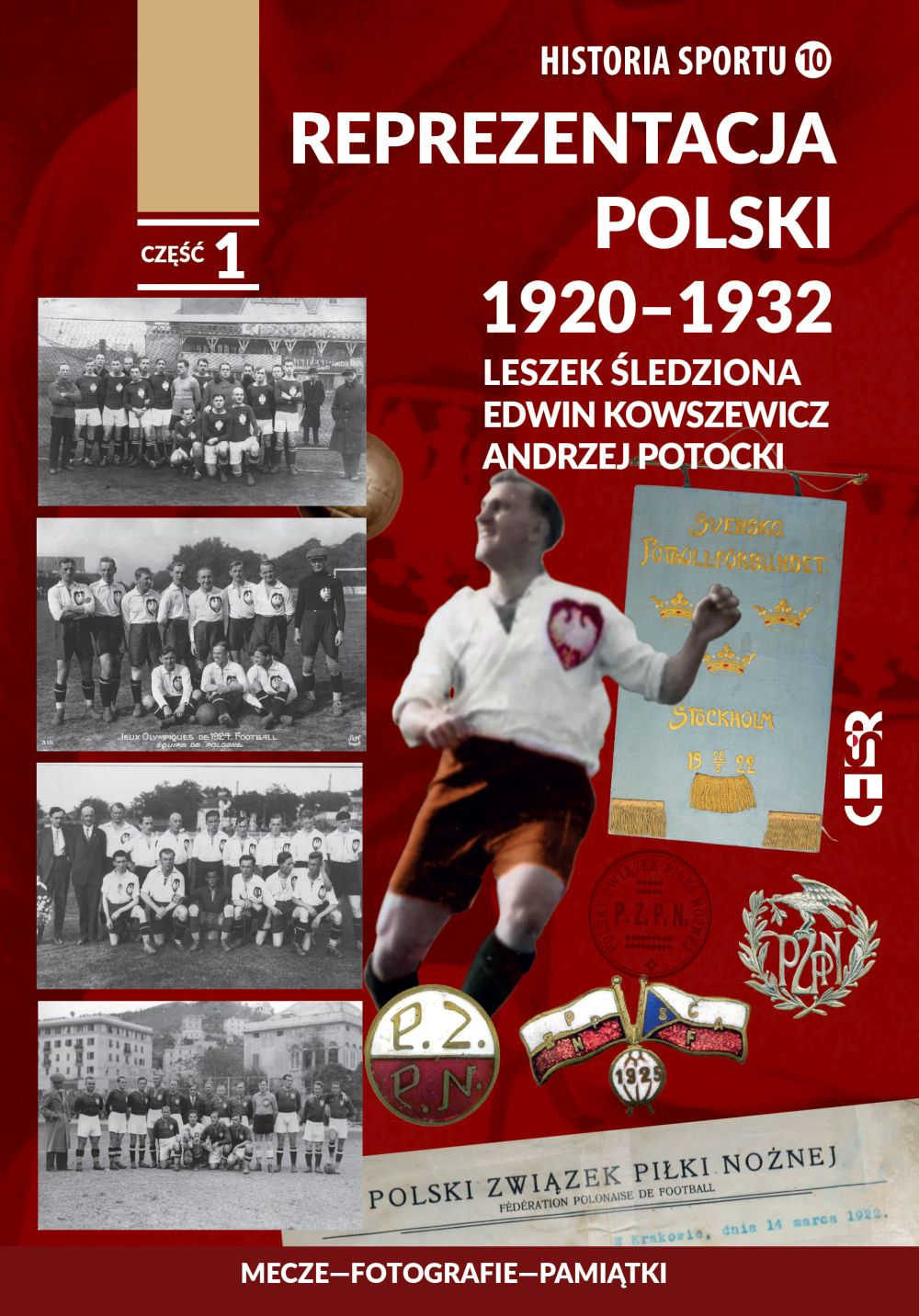
A cover of a sport history book

- List of sports history organisations
- By country
  - History of sport in Australia
  - History of Canadian sports
  - History of sport in China
  - History of sport in Latin America
    - History of sport in Mexico
  - History of sport in the United Kingdom
  - History of sports in the United States
- Bat and ball sports
  - History of baseball
    - Origins of baseball
    - History of baseball in the United States
    - History of baseball outside the United States
    - Dead-ball era
    - Live-ball era
      - Golden age of baseball
  - History of cricket
    - History of cricket to 1725
    - History of English cricket (1726–1750)
    - History of English cricket (1751–1775)
    - History of English cricket (1776–1800)
    - History of English cricket (1801–1825)
    - History of English cricket (1826–1845)
    - History of English cricket (1846–1863)
    - History of women's cricket
- Football codes
  - History of American football
    - Early history of American football
    - Modern history of American football
    - History of the football helmet
  - History of association football
    - History of FIFA
      - History of the FIFA World Cup
    - History of soccer in the United States
  - History of Australian rules football
    - Origins of Australian rules football
  - History of rugby league
  - History of rugby union
    - History of rugby union in Australia
    - History of rugby union in New Zealand
    - History of rugby union in Scotland
    - History of rugby union in Wales
- Hockey
  - History of field hockey
  - History of ice hockey
- History of archery
- History of auto racing
  - History of Formula One
- History of basketball
- History of chess
- History of cycling
- History of disc golf
- History of figure skating
- History of golf
- History of hang gliding
- History of the Gaelic Athletic Association
- History of hurling
- History of lacrosse
- History of martial arts
  - History of capoeira
  - History of fencing
  - History of wrestling
    - History of professional wrestling
  - Historical European martial arts
  - Origins of Asian martial arts
  - Modern history of East Asian martial arts
- History of netball
- History of orienteering
- History of physical training and fitness
- History of rock climbing
- History of rodeo
- History of roller derby
- History of rowing sports
- History of skiing
- History of surfing
- History of swimming
- History of tennis
- History of underwater diving
  - History of scuba diving
- History of water polo

=== Timelines of sports ===
- Timeline of women's sports
- Timeline of the gender pay gap in sports
- Timeline of changes in the sport of athletics
- Timeline of association football
  - Timeline of English football
  - Timeline of Scottish football
  - Timeline of Cape Verdean football
  - Timeline of Malian football
  - Timeline of Senegalese football
- Timeline of foundation of national rugby unions
- Timeline of golf
  - Timeline of golf history (1353–1850)
  - Timeline of golf history (1851–1945)
  - Timeline of golf history (1945–1999)
  - Timeline of golf (2000–present)
- Timeline of martial arts

Timeline of NBA

== Regulation ==
=== Rulebooks ===
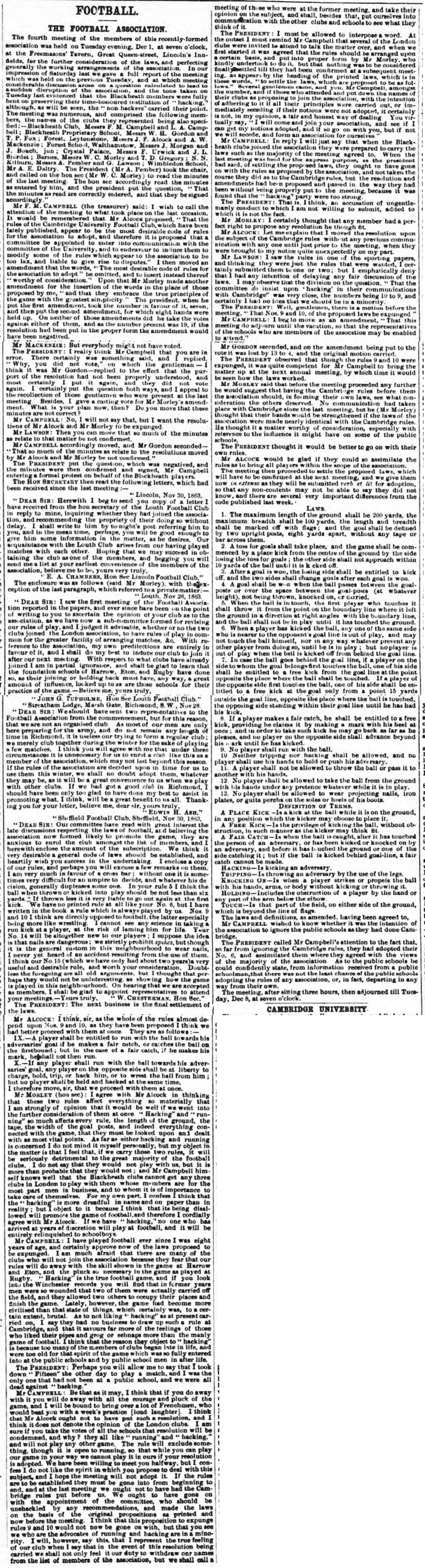
1863 Laws of the Game
- Bat and ball sports
  - Laws of Cricket
  - Rules of baseball
    - Knickerbocker Rules
    - Ground rules
- Combat sports
  - Fencing rules
  - Judo rules
  - Mixed martial arts rules
  - Rules of boxing
    - Broughton Rules
    - London Prize Ring Rules
    - Marquess of Queensberry Rules
- Football codes
  - Laws of Australian rules football
  - Laws of the Game
    - Cambridge rules
    - Sheffield Rules
  - Laws of rugby league
  - Laws of rugby union
  - List of gridiron football rules
    - American football rules
    - Burnside rules
- Hockey
  - Bandy Playing Rules
  - Ice hockey rules
    - Halifax Rules
    - National Hockey League rules
- Mind sports
  - House rule
  - Rules of chess
  - Rules of Go
- Rules of basketball
- Rules of golf
- Rules of netball
- Rules of snooker
- Rules of water polo
- Racing Rules of Sailing

==== Starting play ====
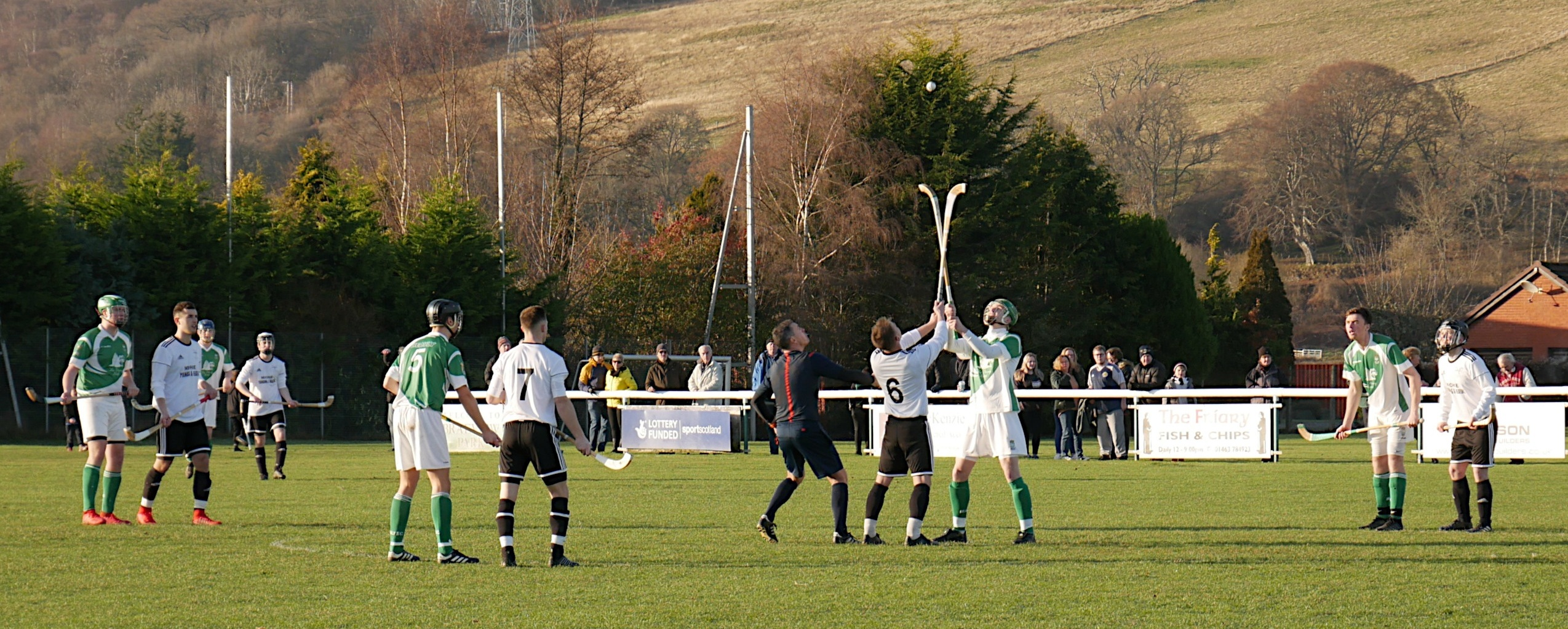
Starting play in shinty by a throw up

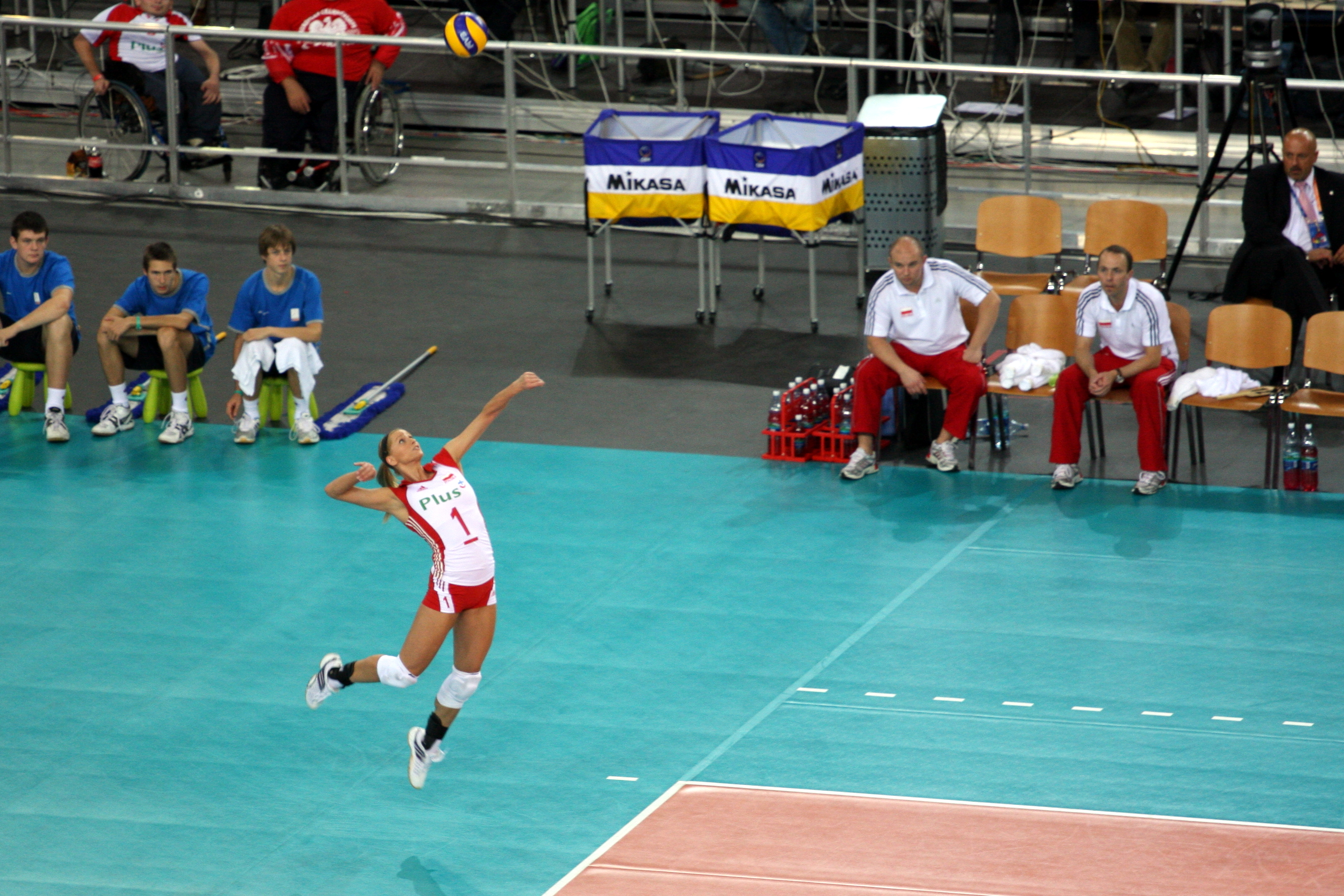
Jump serve in volleyball

Starting play in Dodgeball

- Toss (cricket)
- Dead ball
- Battle for ball possession
  - Ball-up
  - Face-off
  - Jump ball
  - Dropped ball
- Baseball
  - Live ball
- Football codes
  - Kick off
    - Association football
    - Gridiron football
  - Set piece
  - Free kick
    - Soccer
    - Australian rules football
    - Rugby union
  - Australian football
    - Kick-in
  - Rugby
    - Line-out
    - Scrum
  - Soccer
    - Ball in and out of play
    - Throw-in
    - Goal kick
    - Corner kick
- Drive (golf)
- Serve (tennis)

==== Scoring ====
In baseball a grand slam is a type of home run with all bases loaded, scoring a total of 4 runs, the maximum in a single play

Scoring in football codes

Soccer (goal)

Touchdown

Rugby

Ways to win MMA fights

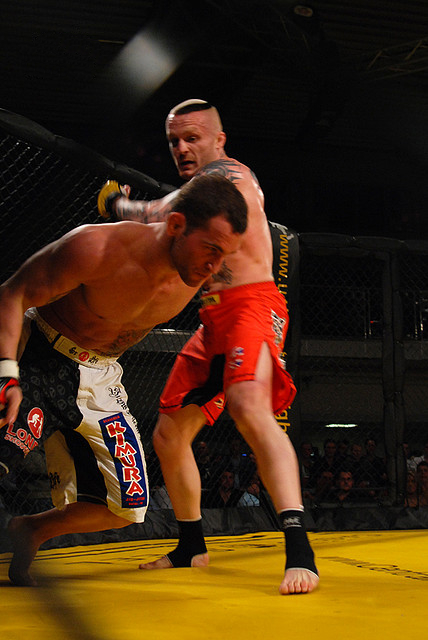
Knockout

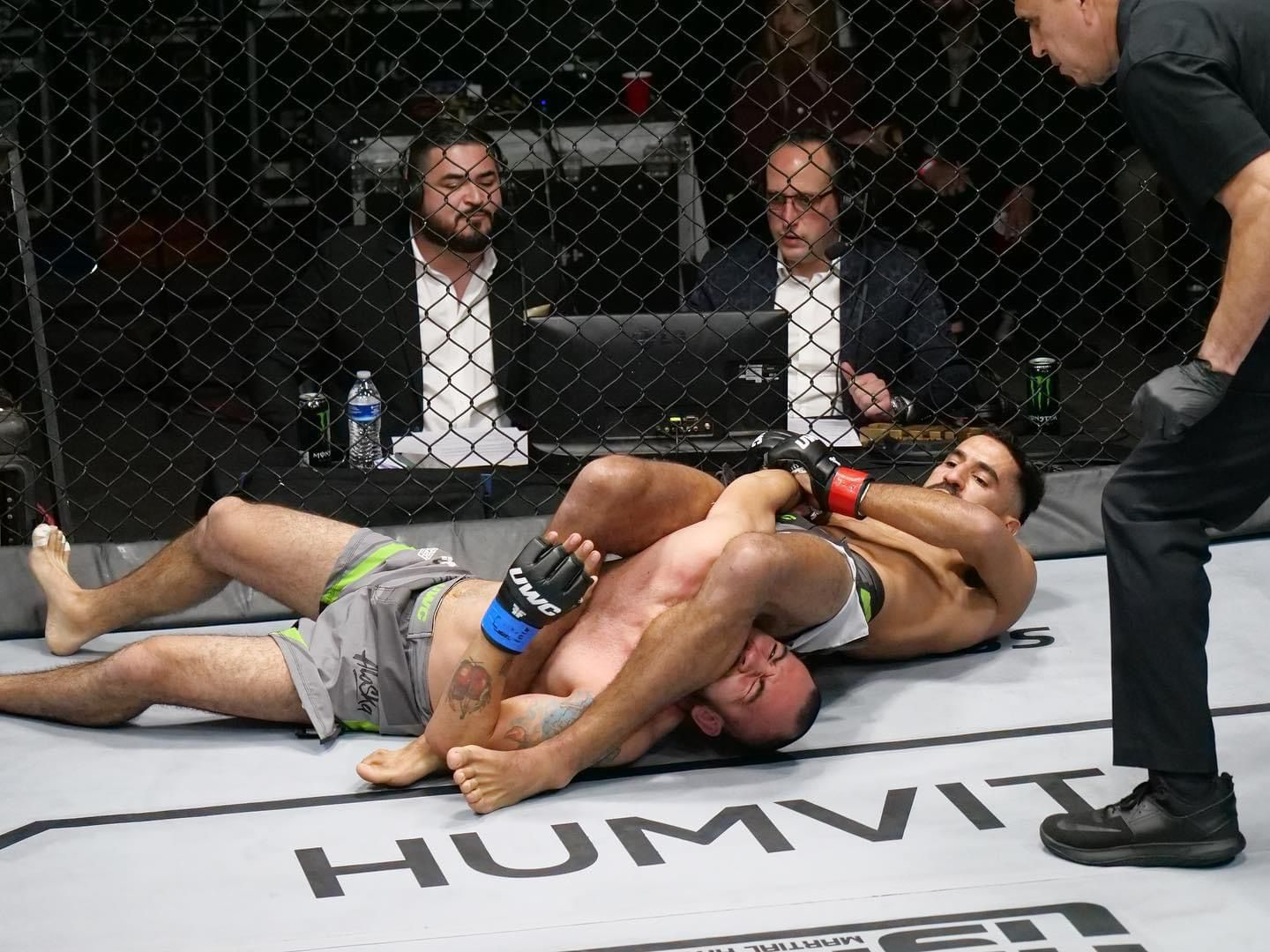
Submission

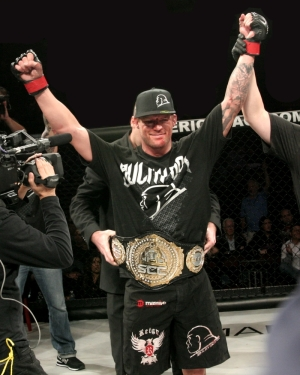
Decision

- No contest
- Tie
- Element
  - Degree of difficulty
- Bat and ball sports (run)
  - Baseball run
    - Home run
      - Grand slam
      - Inside-the-park home run
      - Walk-off home run
  - Cricket run
    - Extra
      - No-ball
      - Wide
      - Bye
      - Leg bye
      - Penalty run
- Goal
  - No goal
  - Own goal
  - Basketball
    - Field goal
    - Three-point field goal
    - Buzzer beater
  - Field goal
  - Rugby
    - Drop goal
    - Field goal
    - Goal from mark
  - Ice hockey
  - Scoring in association football
    - Last-minute goal
    - Ghost goal
  - Scoring in Gaelic games
- Gridiron football
  - Touchdown
    - Walk-off touchdown
  - Conversion
    - Two-point conversion
  - Safety
  - Canadian Football
    - Single
- Try
- Par
  - Hole in one
  - Stroke play
  - Par (golf scoring format)
  - Match play
  - Stableford
- Scoring system development of badminton
- Tennis scoring system
  - Point
- Decisions in combat sports
  - Knockout
  - Corner retirement
  - Submission
  - Split decision
  - Majority decision
  - Unanimous decision
  - Points decision
  - Newspaper decision
  - Split draw
  - Majority draw
  - Technical decision
  - Technical draw
- Code of Points
- Decathlon scoring tables
- ISU Judging System
  - Compulsory figures
    - Demise and revival of compulsory figures
- Video games

==== Infraction ====
Penalty shots

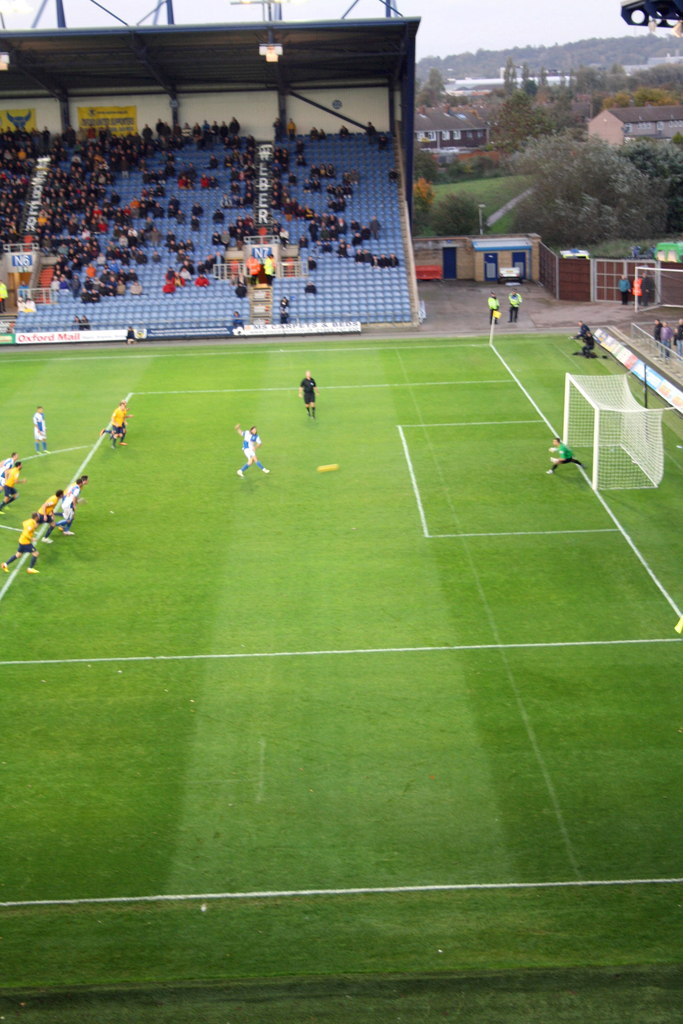
Penalty kick

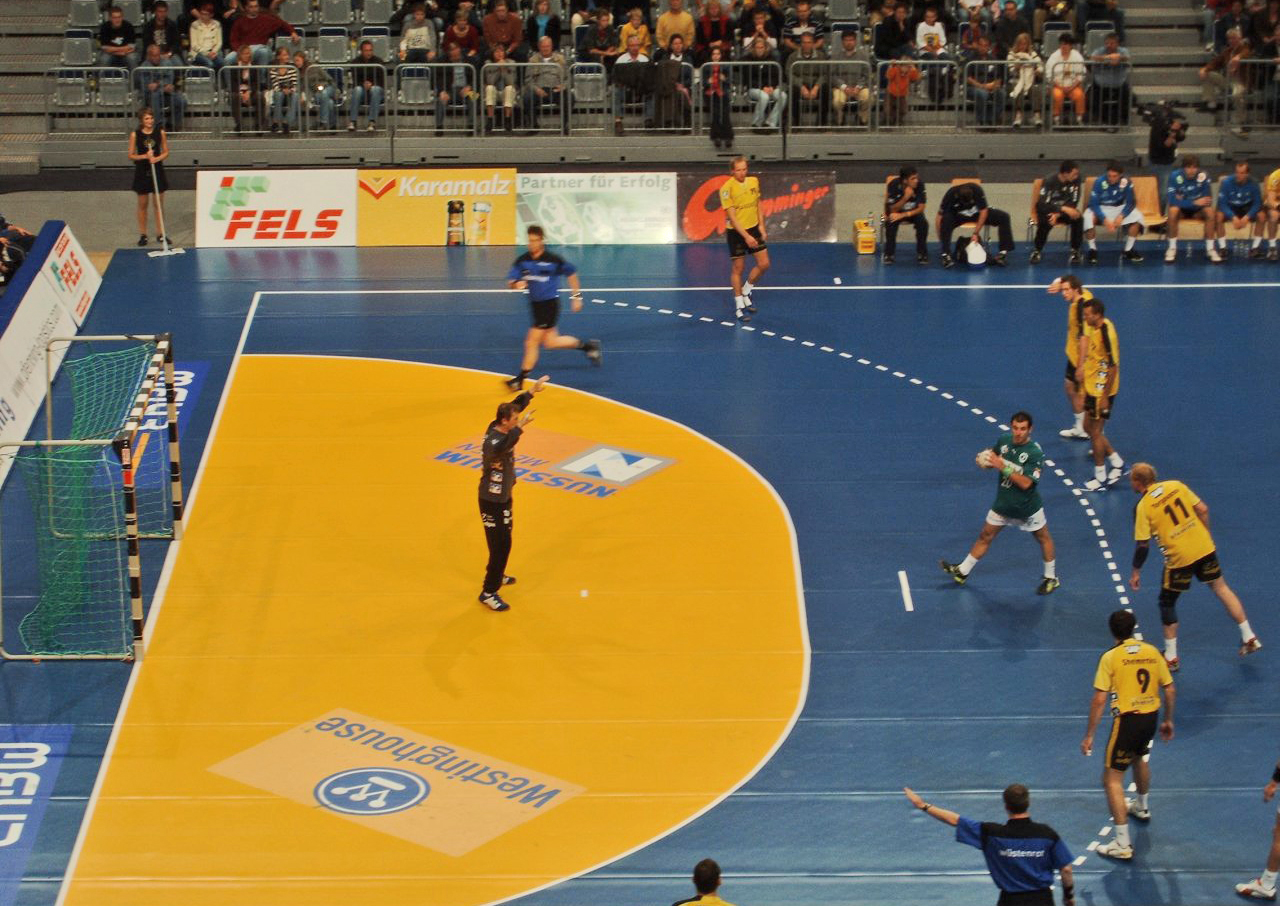
7-meter throw (handball)

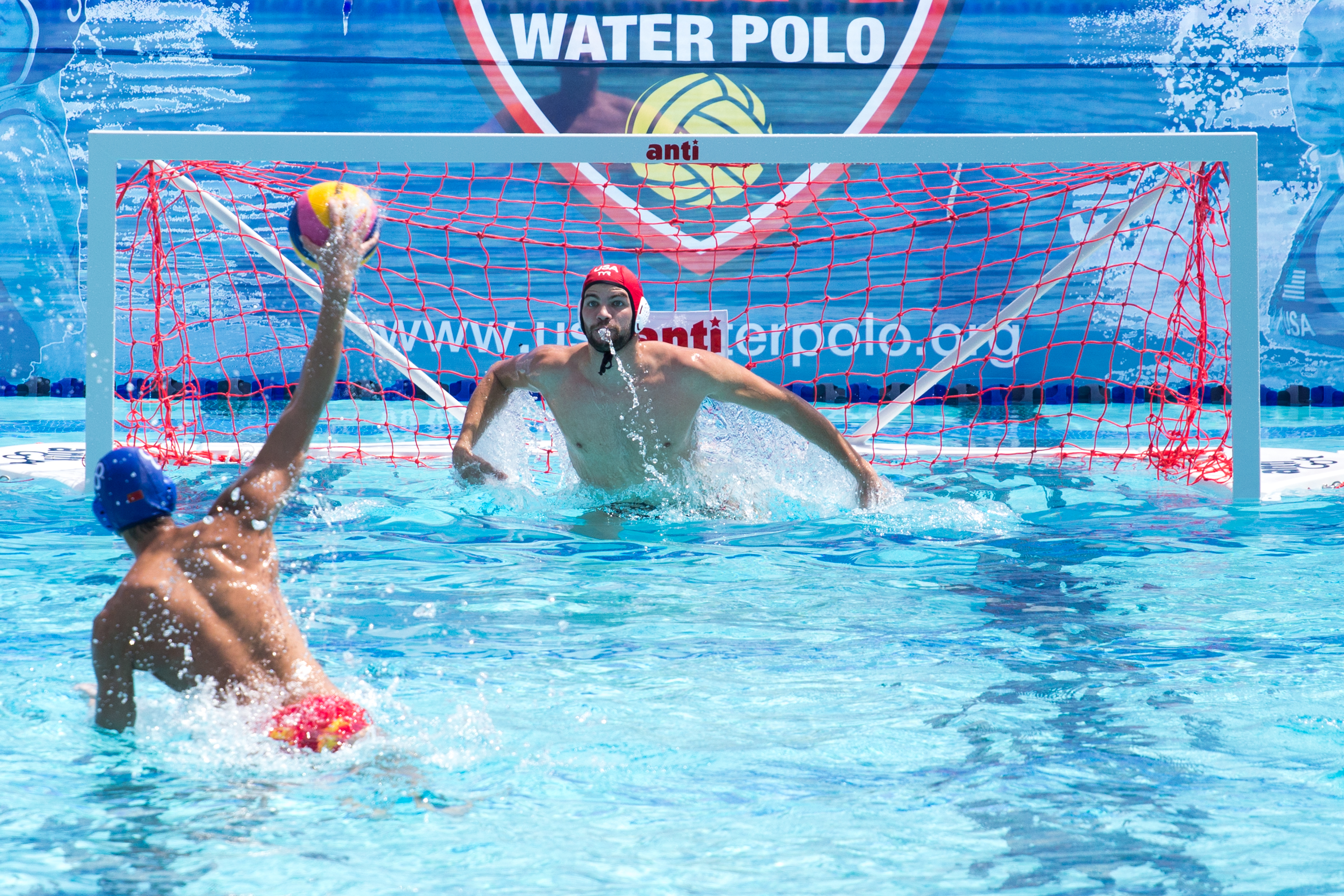
Penalty throw (waterpolo)

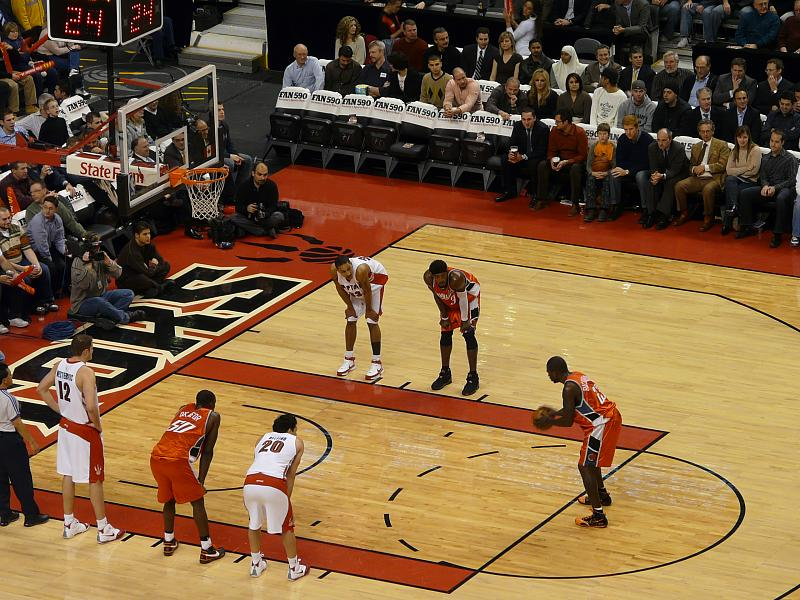
Free throw

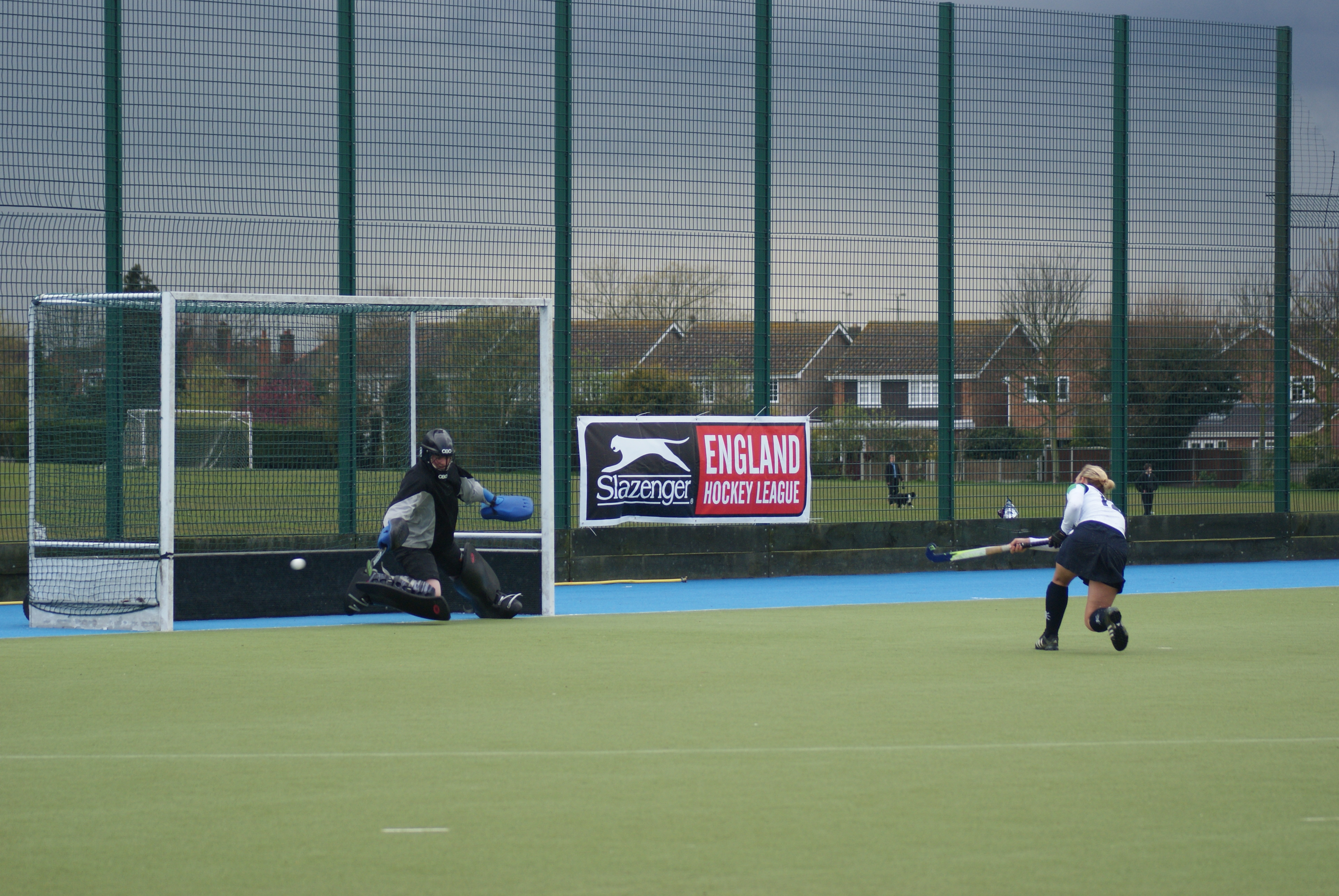
Penalty stroke

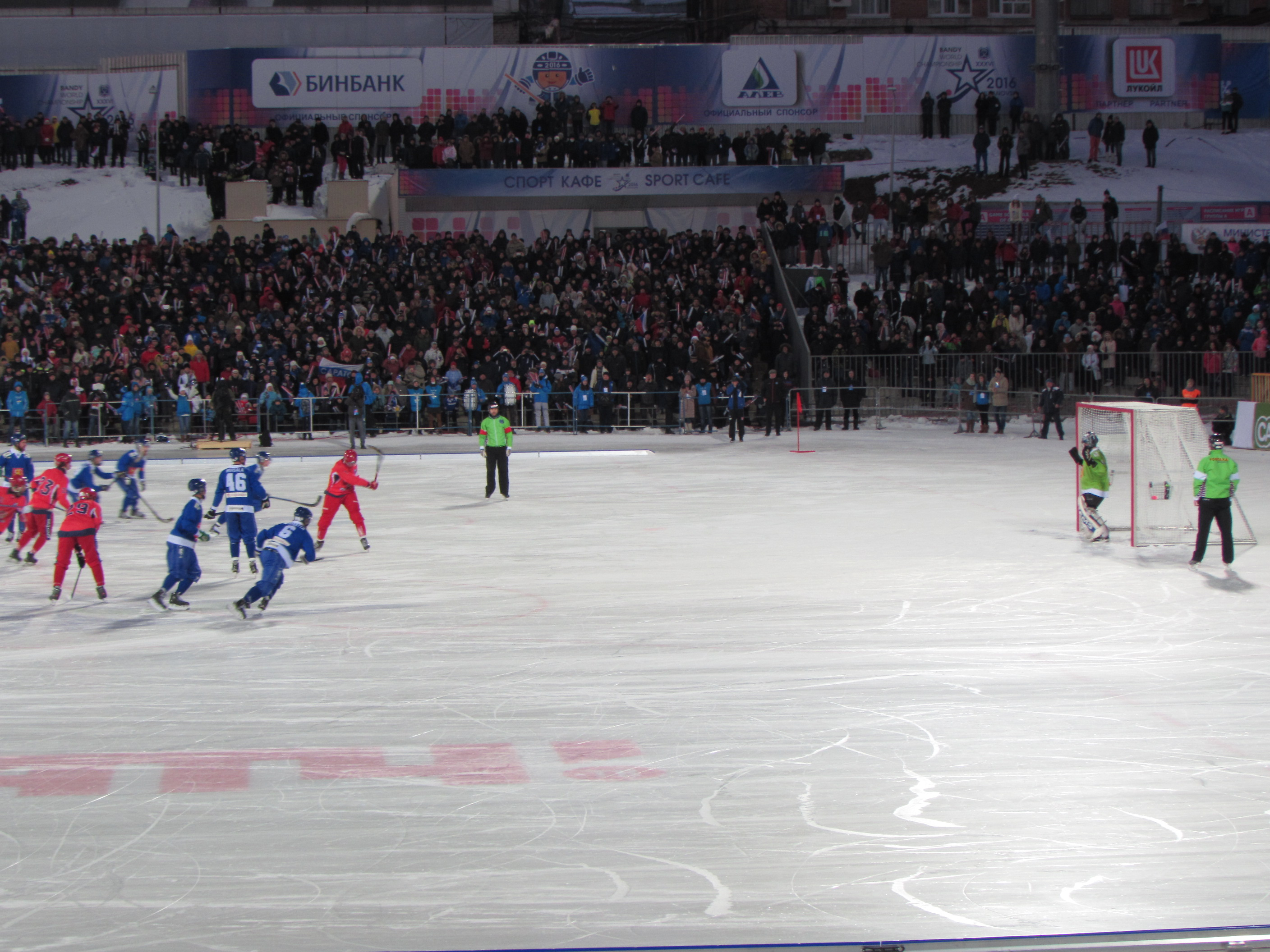
Penalty shot (bandy)

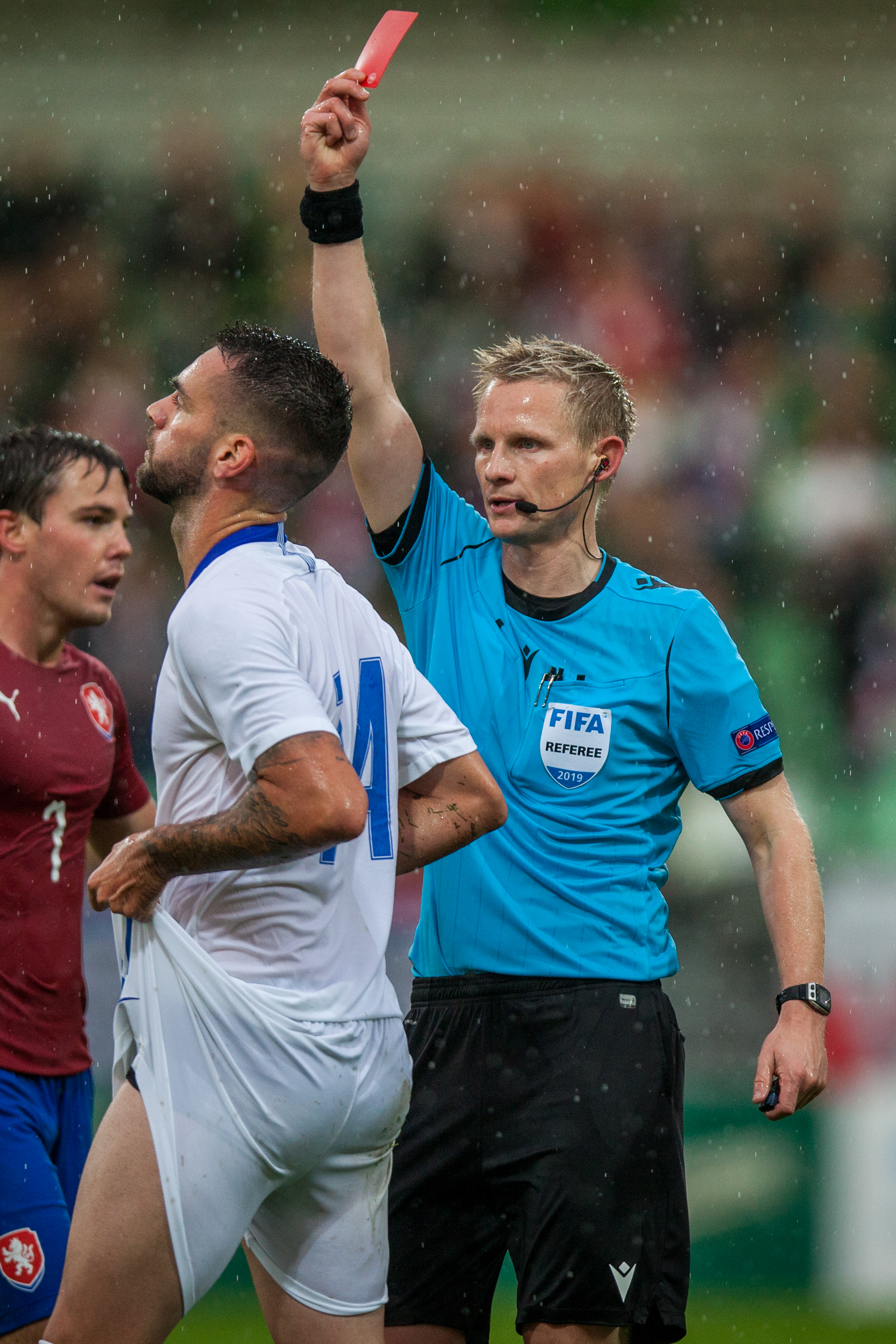
An ejection in association football by drawing a red card

- Foul
  - Professional foul
  - Unsportsmanlike conduct
  - Penalty
    - Match penalty
    - Penalty shot
      - Penalty kick
      - Penalty stroke
      - Ice hockey
      - Free throw
    - Golf
    - Gridiron football
    - Penalty corner
    - Ice hockey
    - Rugby
      - Rugby union
  - Association football
  - Basketball
    - Flagrant foul
    - Personal foul
    - Technical foul
- Interference
  - Basket interference
  - Pass interference
  - Baseball
- Offside
  - Football codes
    - Association football
    - American football
    - Rugby
  - Hockey
    - Bandy
    - Ice hockey
    - Field hockey
- Icing
- Violation (basketball)
  - Carrying
  - Double dribble
  - Traveling
  - Defensive three-second violation
  - Goaltending
- Ejection
  - Disqualification
    - Boxing
    - Tennis)
- False start
- Too many men

==== Partials and time management ====
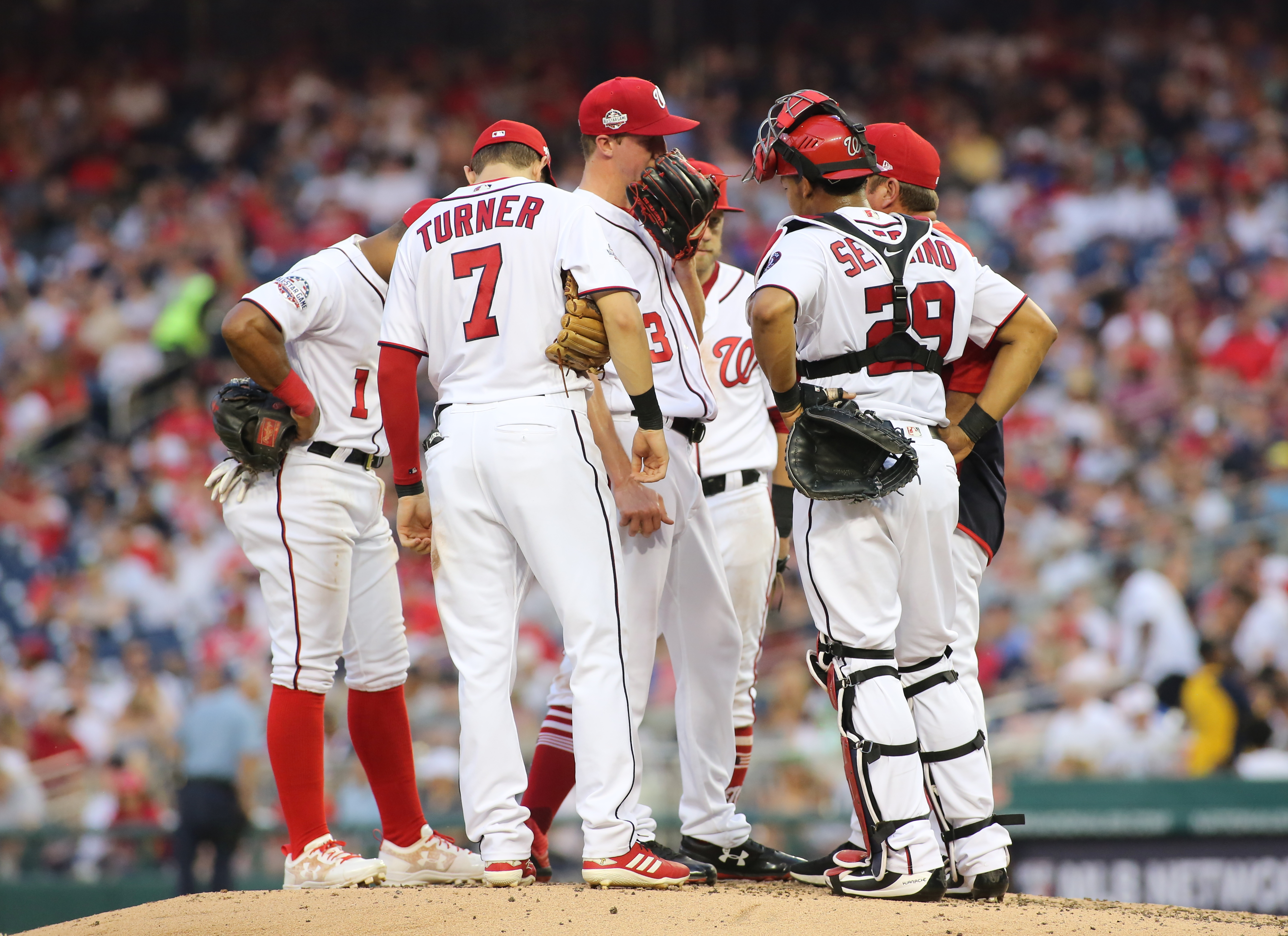
Mound visit in baseball

- Innings
  - Baseball
  - Cricket
- Leg
- Playing period
- Half-time
- Water stop
- Time-out
  - Television timeout
  - Technical time-out (volleyball)
- Untimed play

==== Handicapping ====
- Equestrian
  - Horse racing
  - Polo
- Golf
- Greyhound racing
- Mind sports
  - Chess
  - Go
  - Shogi
- Sailing

==== Weight class ====
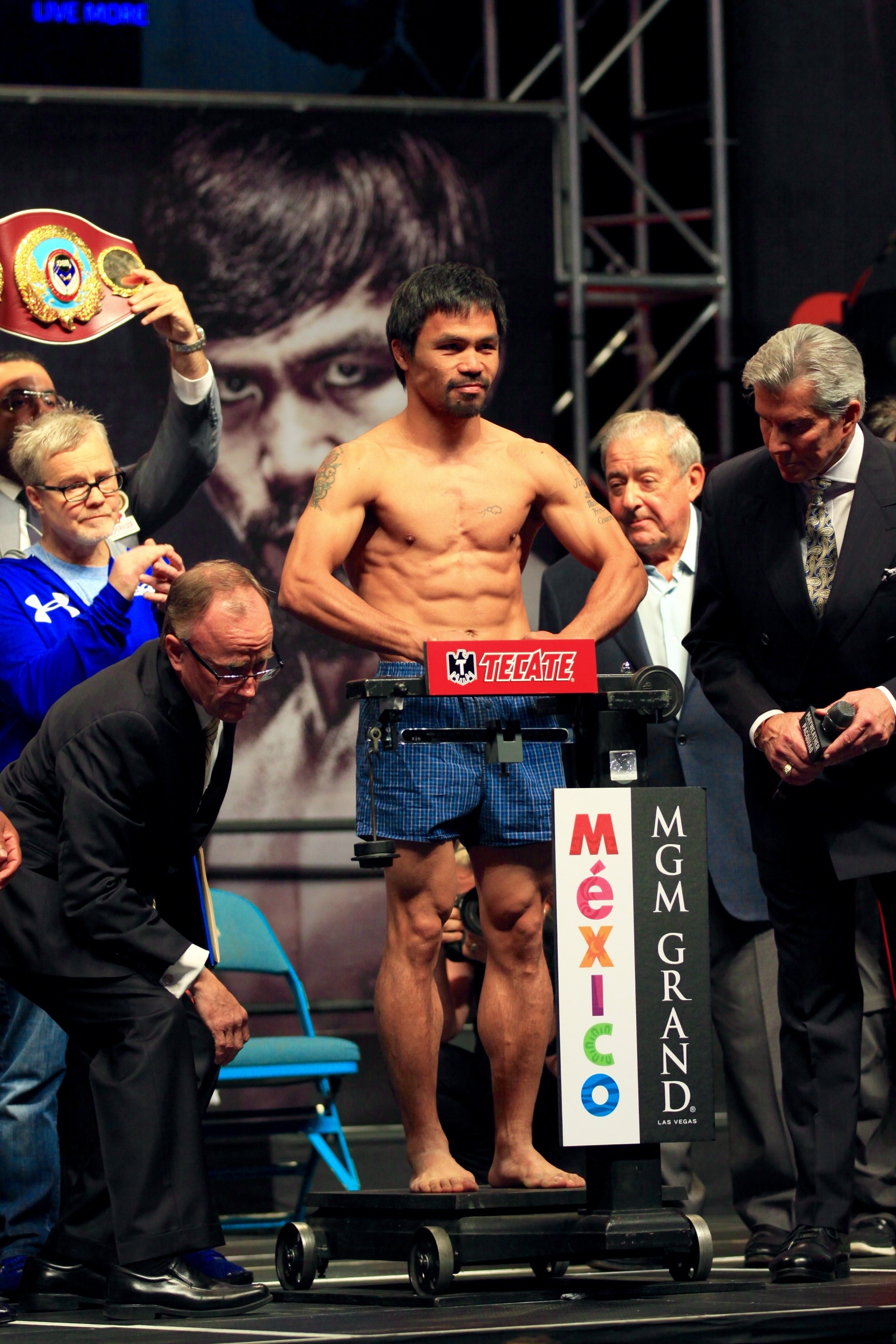
Weight-ins in Boxing and MMA
- Catchweight
- Openweight
- Brazilian jiu-jitsu
- Boxing
- Kickboxing
- Mixed martial arts
- Taekwondo
- Wrestling
  - Professional wrestling

=== Venues ===
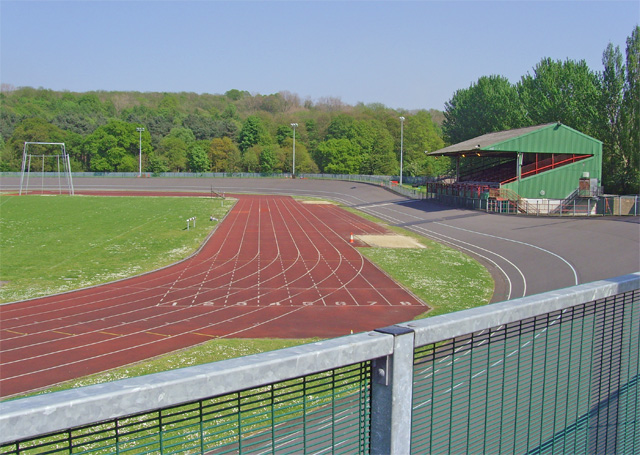
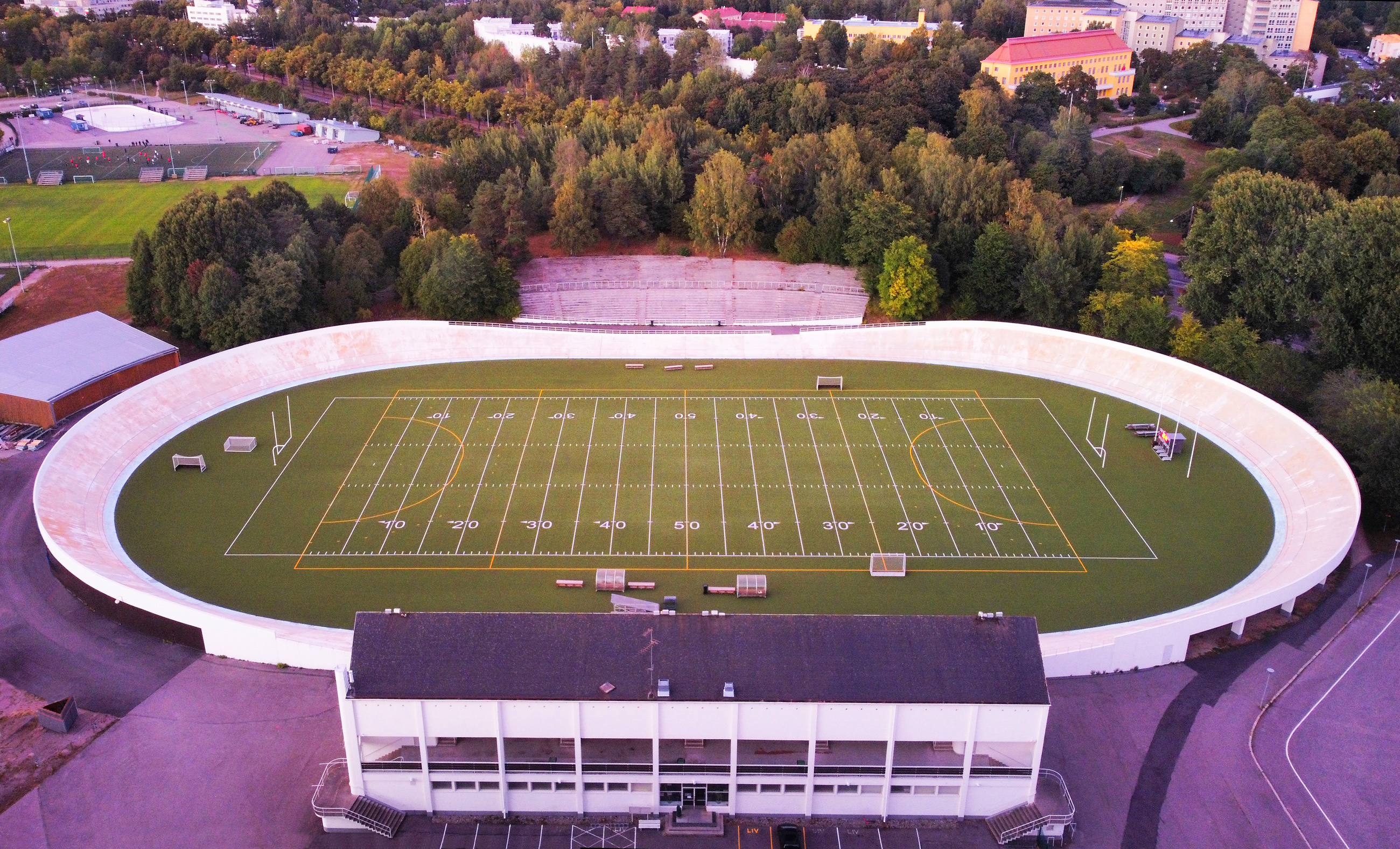
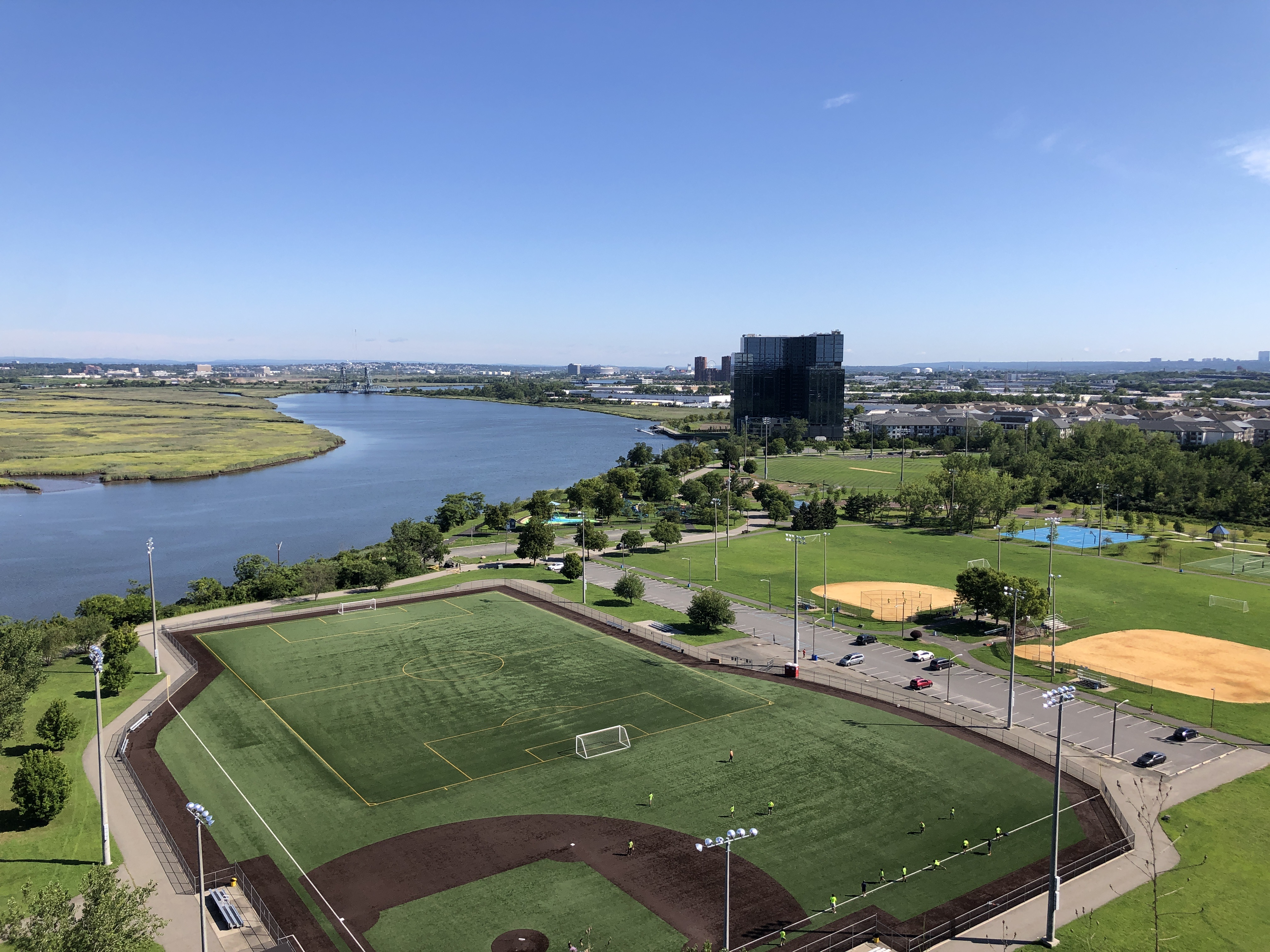
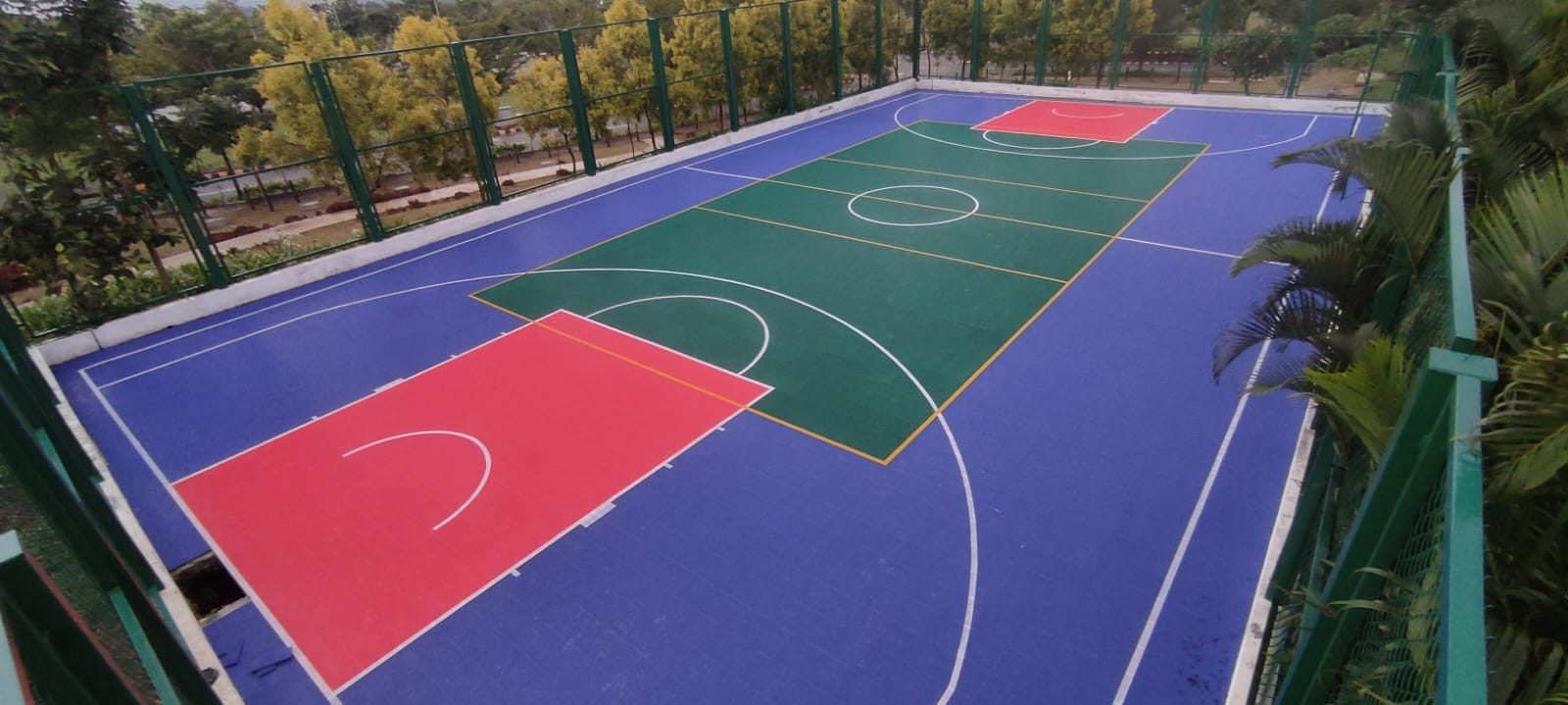
Multi-purpose sport venues
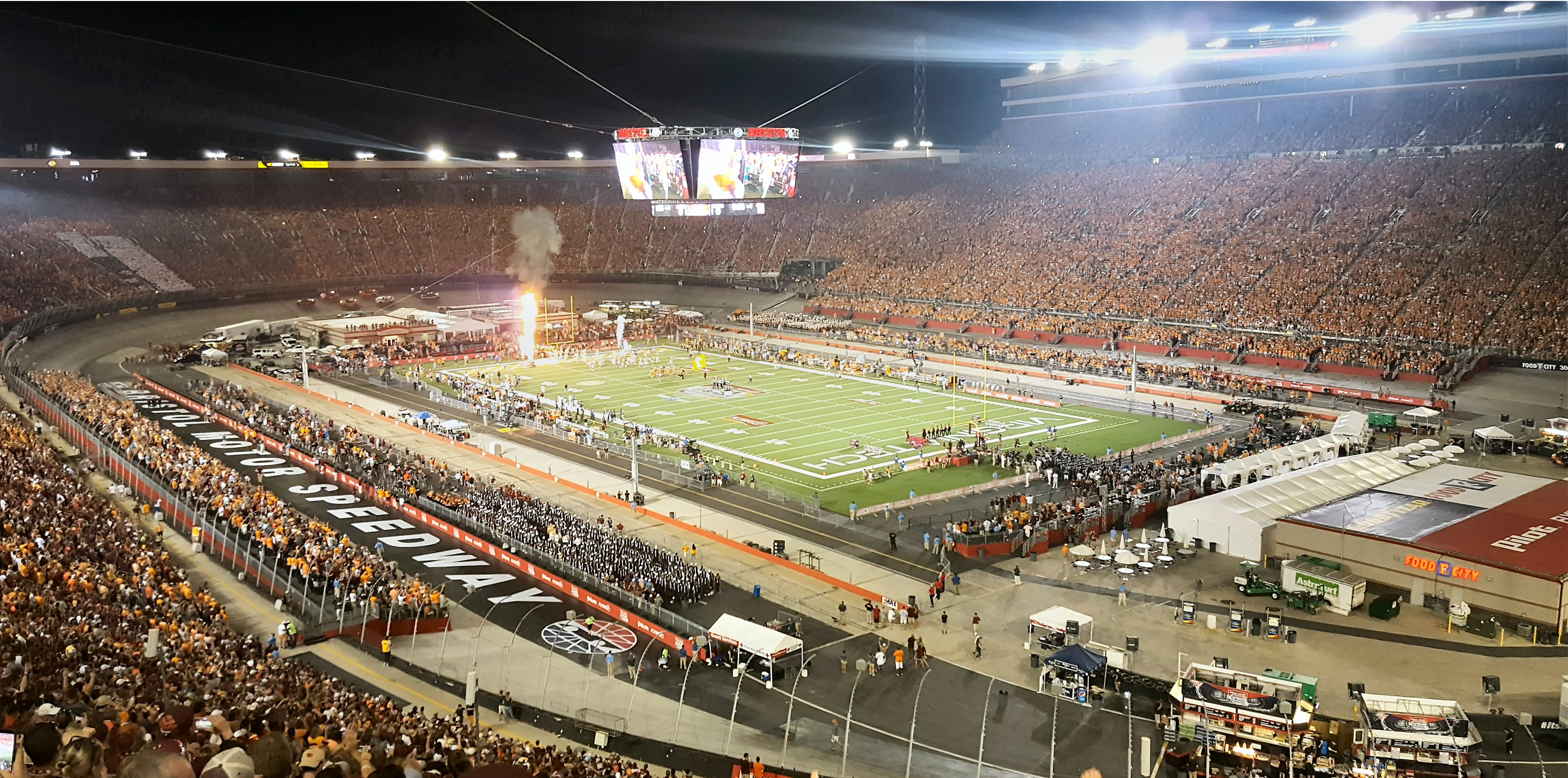
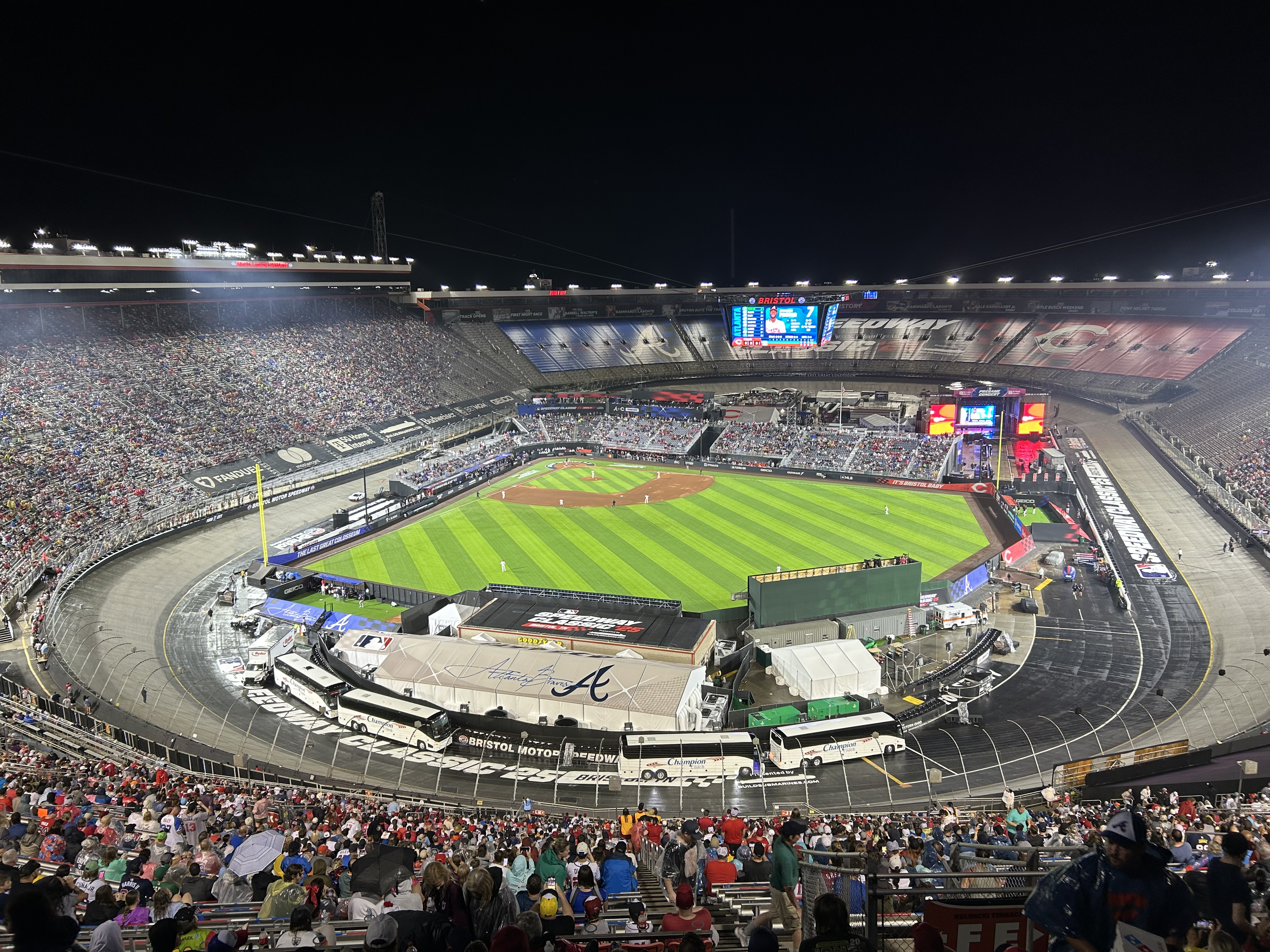
Bristol Motor Speedway when it was temporarily used as american football and baseball fields

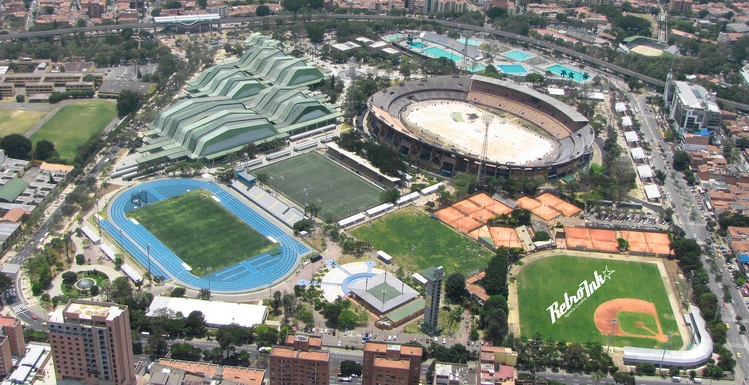
Sport complex

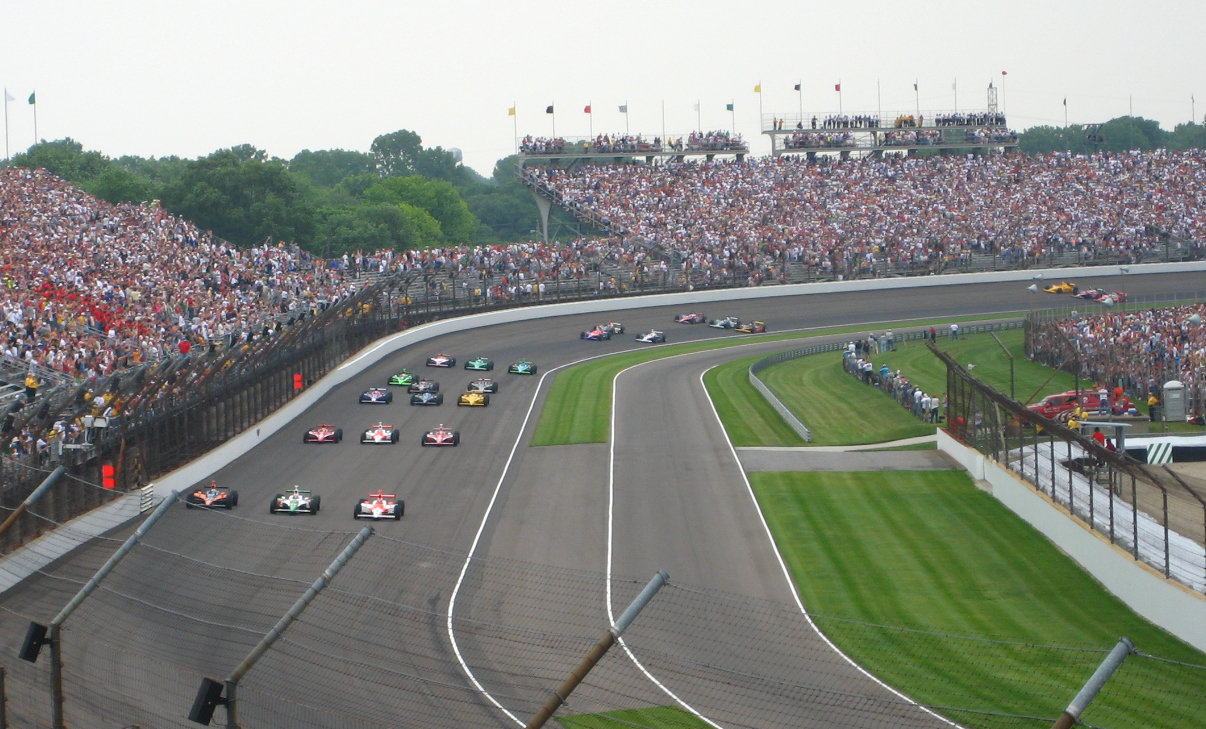
Indianapolis Motor Speedway, the sport venue with the largest capacity in the world

- Arena
  - Ice hockey arena
  - Velodrome
  - Palace of Sports
- Billiard hall
- Bowling alley
  - Pinsetter
- Gym
- Gymkhana
- Indoor practice facility
- Race track
  - Run-off area
- Training ground
- Sportsbook
  - Betting shop
- Multi-Use Games Area
- Sports complex
  - Olympic Park
- Stadium
  - All-seater stadium
  - Multi-purpose stadium
    - Octorad
  - Olympic Stadium
  - Baseball park
    - Batter's eye
    - Bullpen
    - Dugout
  - Cricket ground
    - Cricket pavilion
  - Soccer-specific stadium
- Lists of sports venues
  - List of Olympic venues
    - List of Olympic Villages
    - List of Youth Olympic venues
  - List of Commonwealth Games venues
  - List of World Games venues in muaythai
  - List of artificial whitewater courses
  - List of bobsleigh, luge, and skeleton tracks
  - List of horse racing venues
    - List of horse racing venues by capacity
  - List of motor racing tracks
    - List of motor racing venues by capacity
  - List of rowing venues
  - List of ski areas and resorts
    - List of ski jumping hills
  - List of swimming pools
    - List of largest swimming pools
  - List of sports venues named after individuals
  - List of sports venues by capacity
    - List of sporting venues with a highest attendance of 100,000 or more
  - List of indoor arenas
    - List of tennis venues
      - List of tennis stadiums by capacity
    - List of cycling tracks and velodromes
    - List of indoor speed skating rinks
    - List of indoor arenas by capacity
      - List of ice hockey arenas by capacity
  - Lists of stadiums
    - List of national stadiums
    - List of FIFA World Cup stadiums
    - List of stadiums by capacity
      - List of indoor stadiums
      - List of future stadiums
      - List of closed stadiums by capacity
      - List of track and field stadiums by capacity
      - Bat and ball sports
        - List of ballparks by capacity
        - List of cricket grounds by capacity
      - Football codes
        - List of American football stadiums by capacity
        - List of association football stadiums by capacity
        - List of Canadian football stadiums
        - Rugby
          - List of rugby league stadiums by capacity
          - List of rugby union stadiums by capacity

==== Pitches ====
Several sport pitches

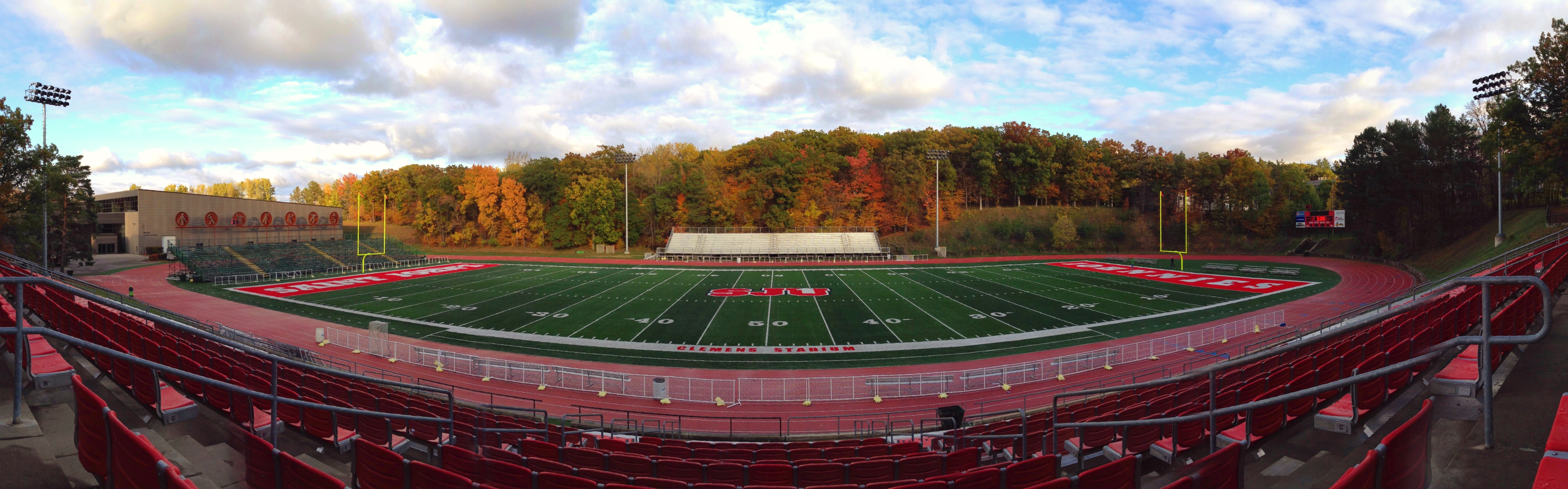
Panorama of american football field

Multipurpose basketball and futsal/handball goalpost

Curling sheet
Types of combat areas

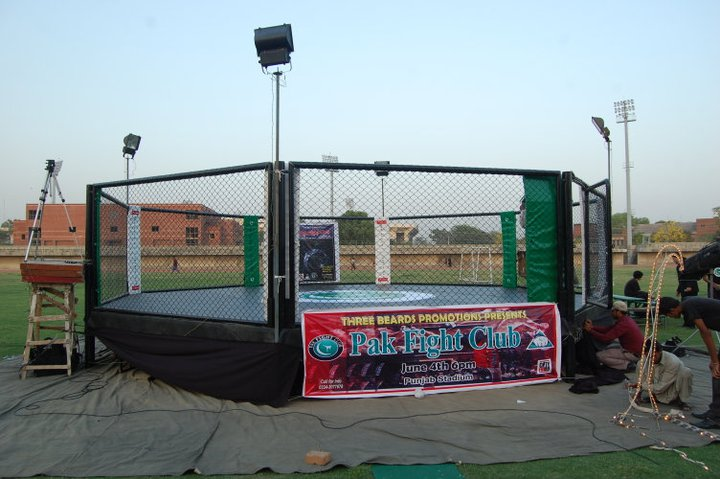
Octagonal cage

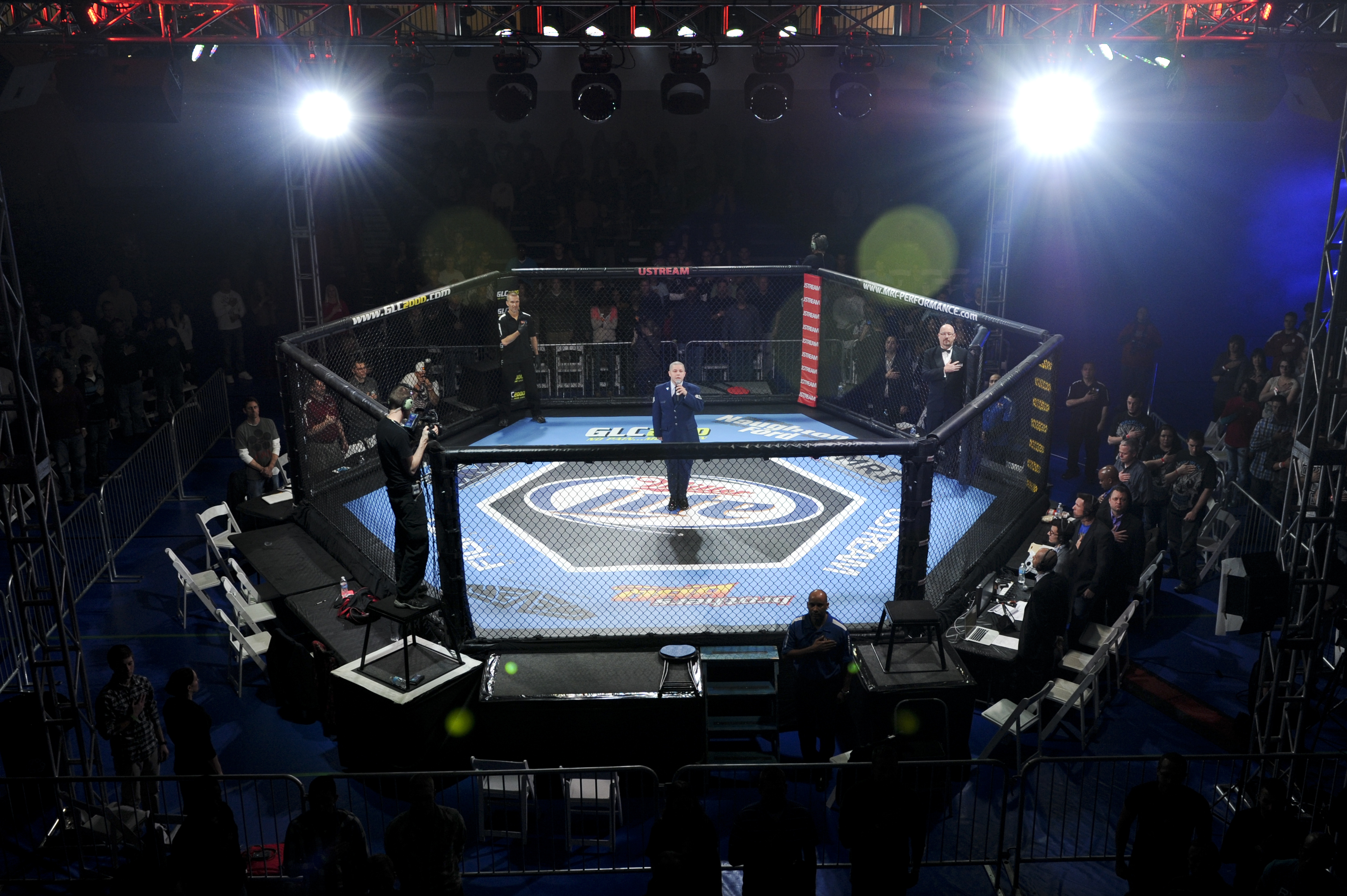
Hexagonal cage

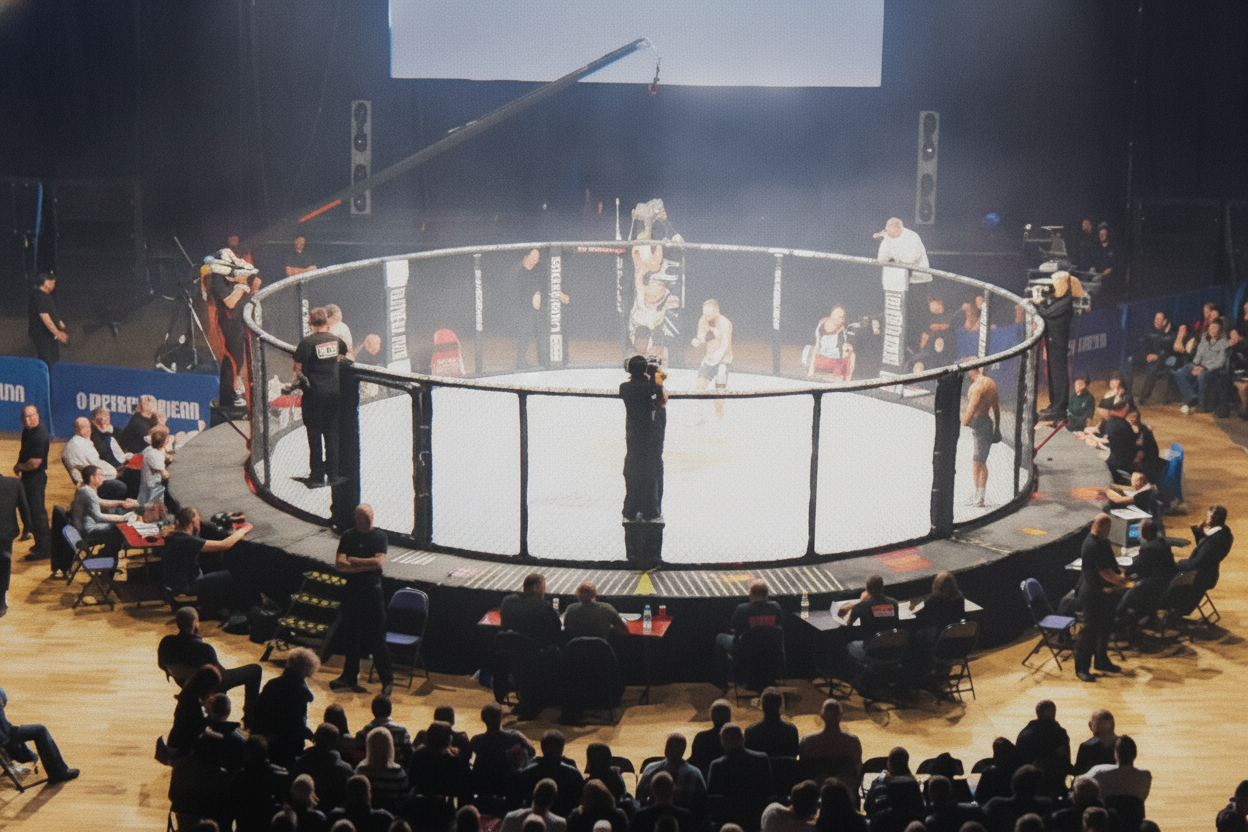
Circular cage

Square ring

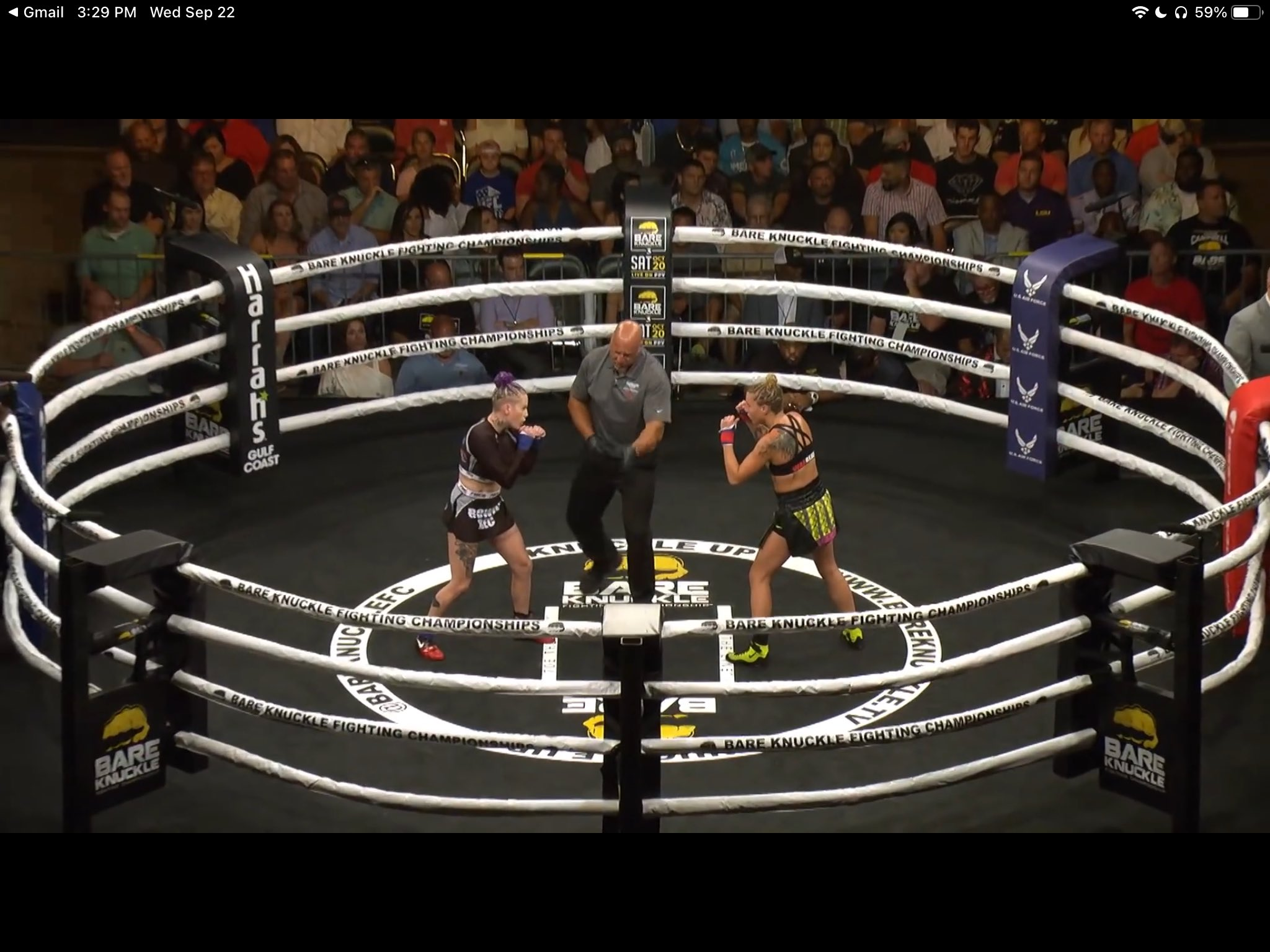
Circular ring

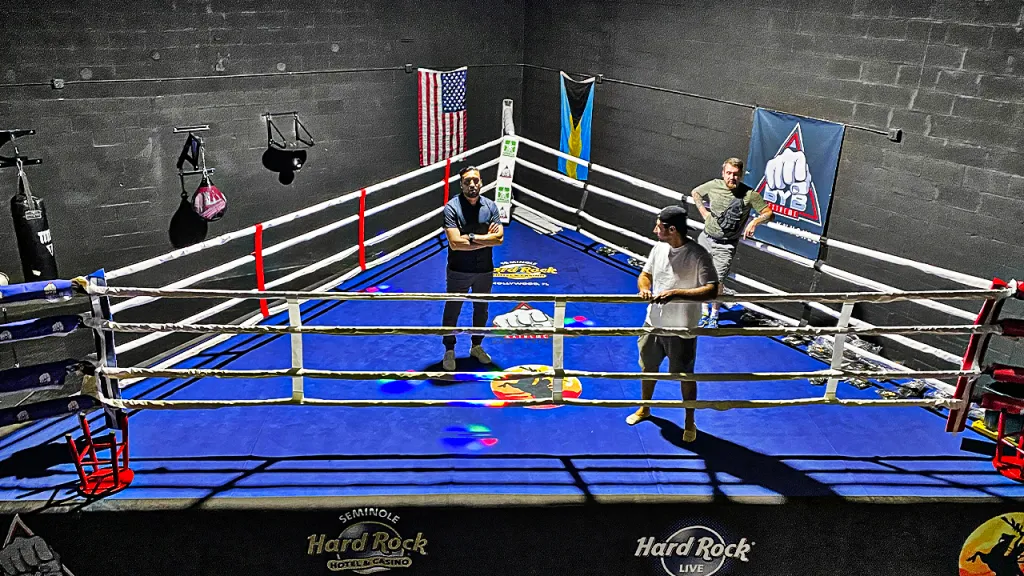
Triangular ring

Circular combat pit

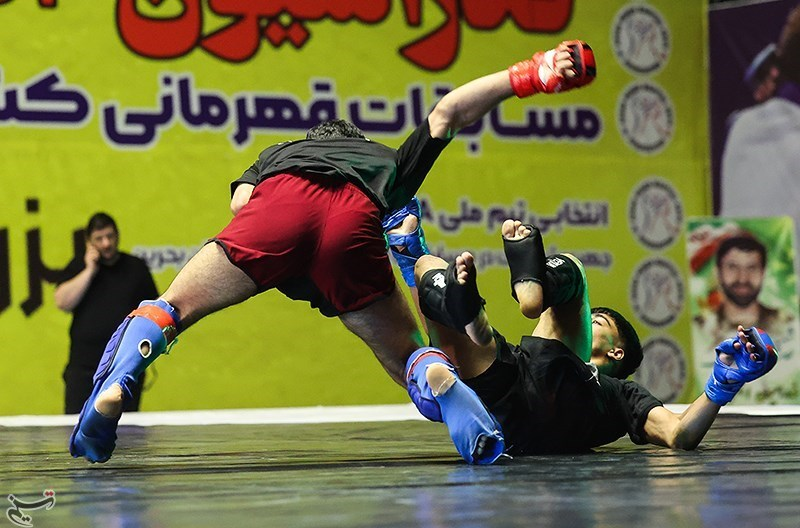
Tatami

First row shows MMA cages. Second row shows boxing rings
- Infield
- Midfield
- Outfield
- Out of bounds
- Goalposts
  - Basketball
    - Backboard
    - Basket
      - Rim
      - Breakaway rim
      - Net
- Basketball court
  - Key
  - Glass basketball court
- Bat and ball sports
  - Baseball field
    - On-deck
    - Warning track
  - Cricket field
    - Cricket pitch
      - Crease
      - Stump
      - Bail
    - Boundary
    - Sight screen
- Combat sports
  - Boxing ring
  - Wrestling ring
  - MMA cage
  - Dohyō
  - Lei tai
  - Piste
- Football codes
  - American football field
    - End zone
  - Association football pitch
    - Penalty area
  - Australian rules football playing field
  - Rugby league playing field
- Basque pelota
  - Basque trinquete
  - Fronton
- Valencian trinquet
- Golf course
  - Teeing ground
  - Bunkers and penalty areas
- Hockey variants
  - Bandy field
  - Field hockey pitch
  - Ice hockey rink
- Ice rink
  - Figure skating rink
  - Speed skating rink
- Olympic-size swimming pool
- Roller rink
- Running track
- Tennis court
  - Clay court
  - Grass court
  - Hard court
  - Carpet court
  - Wood court
  - No-line court

==== Venue features ====
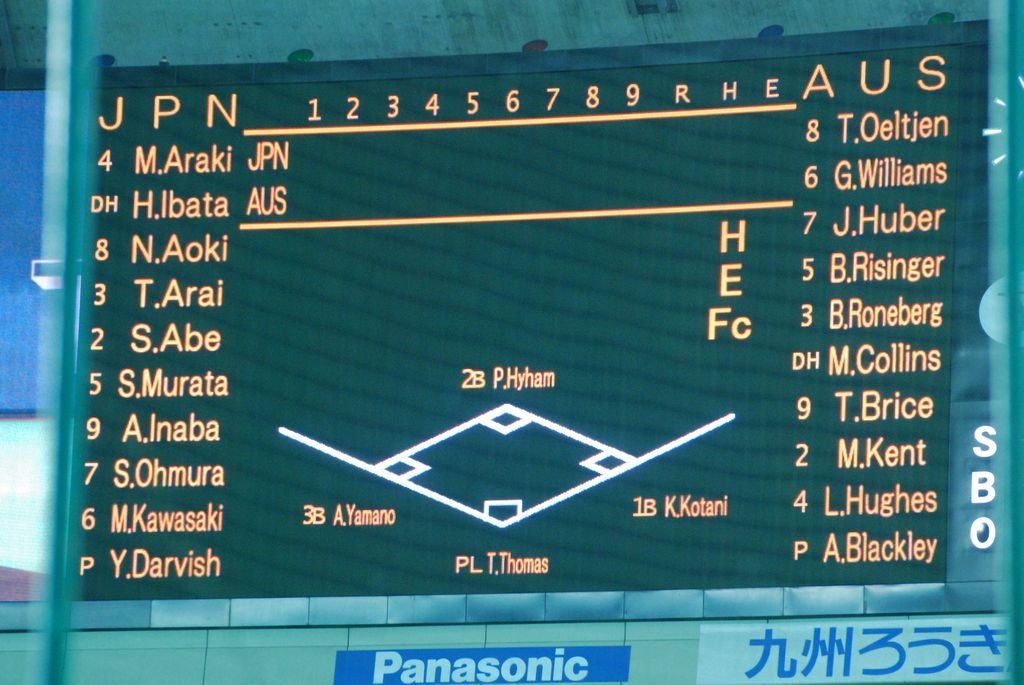
Baseball scoreboard

- Seating
  - Bleacher
    - Mobile bleacher
  - Movable seating
  - Terrace
  - Safe standing
  - Club seating
  - All-you-can-eat seats
  - Field house
  - Grandstand
  - Luxury box
  - Curva
- Coach's box
- Penalty box
- Press box
- Floodlights
- Groundshare
- Leisure centre
- Medialuna
- Scoreboard
  - Playograph
- Tote board
- Palaestra
- Artificial turf

=== Equipment ===
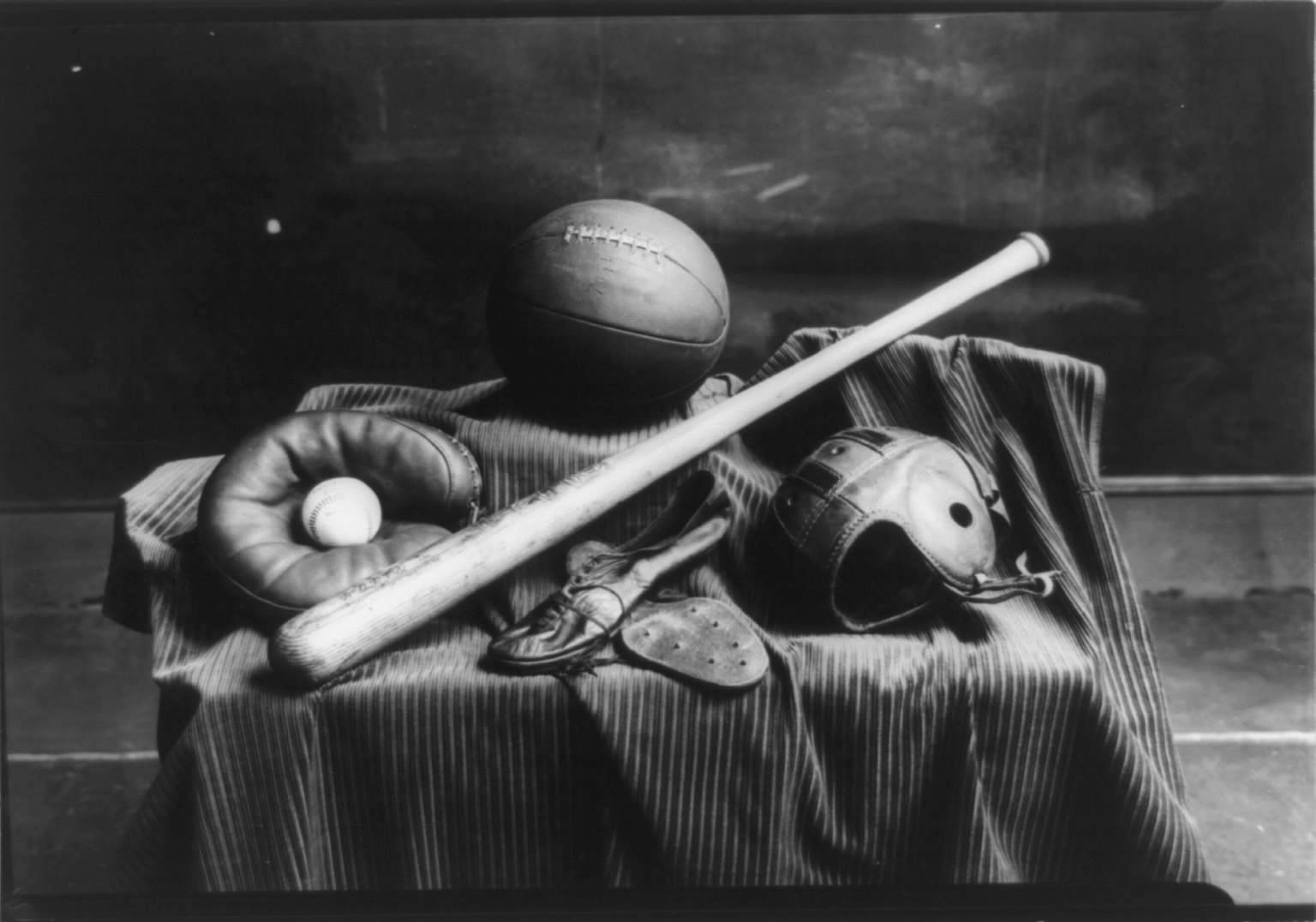
Historic sport equipment

Balls

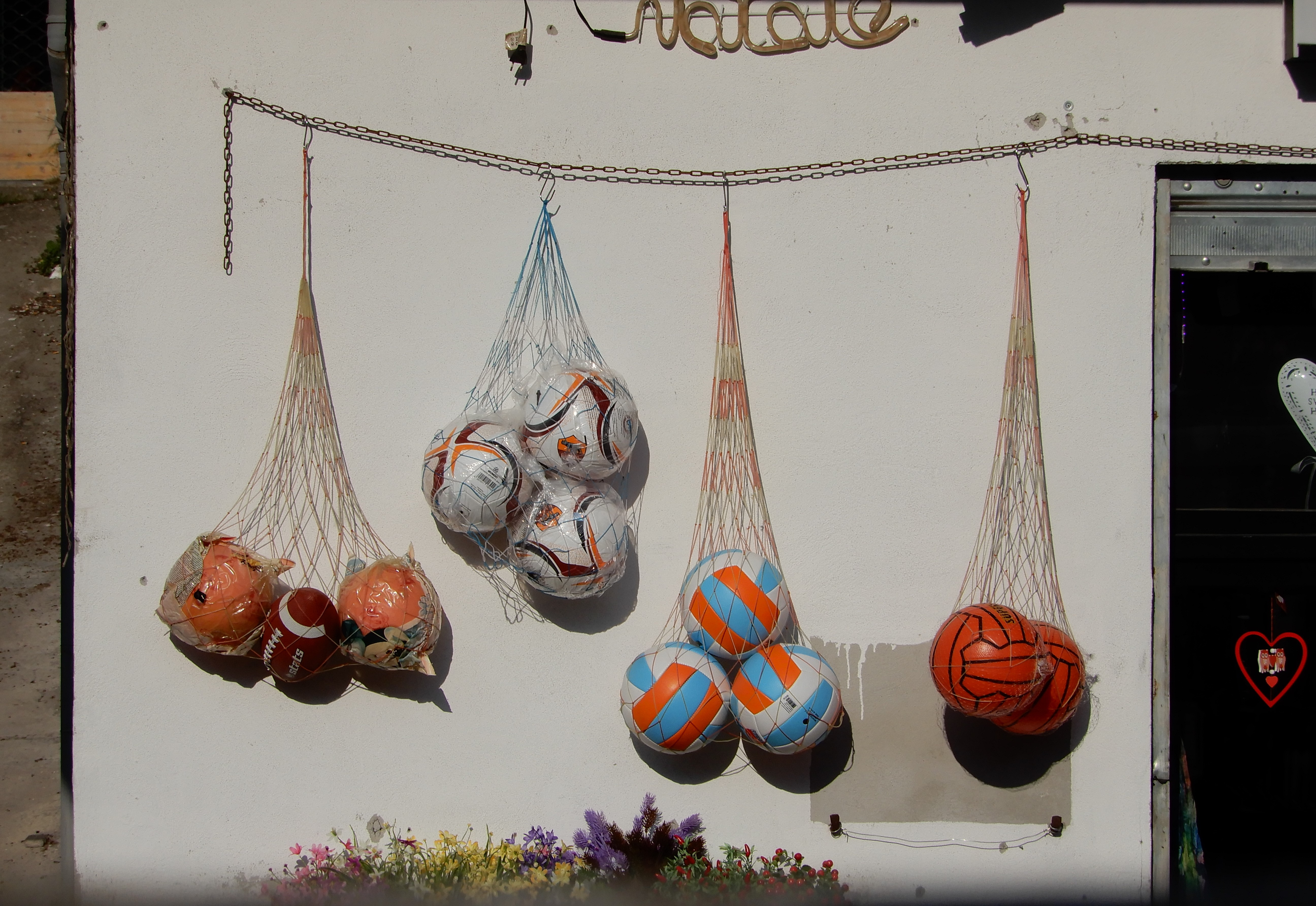
group of sport balls

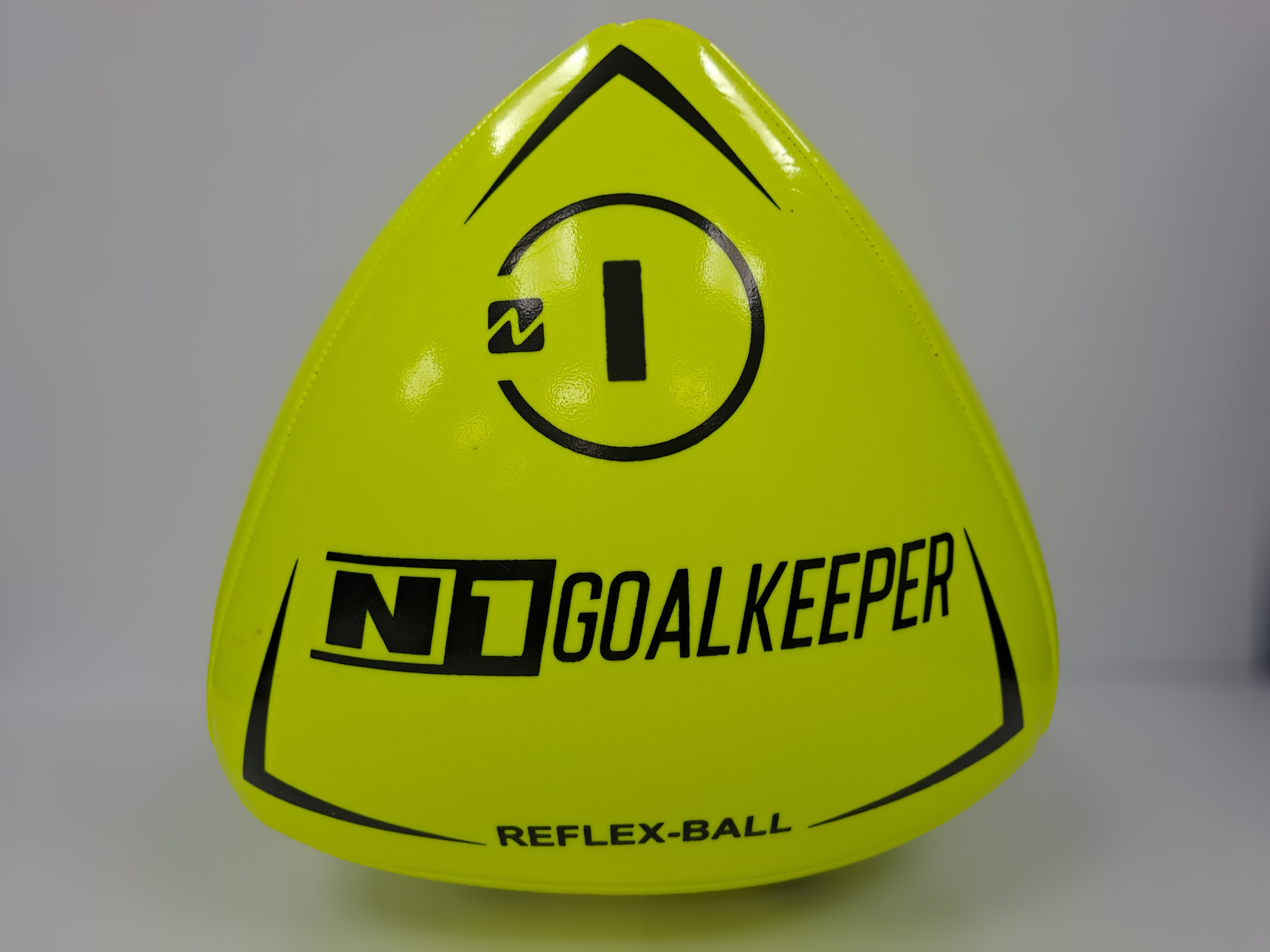
Non spherical reflex ball used in goalkeeper training

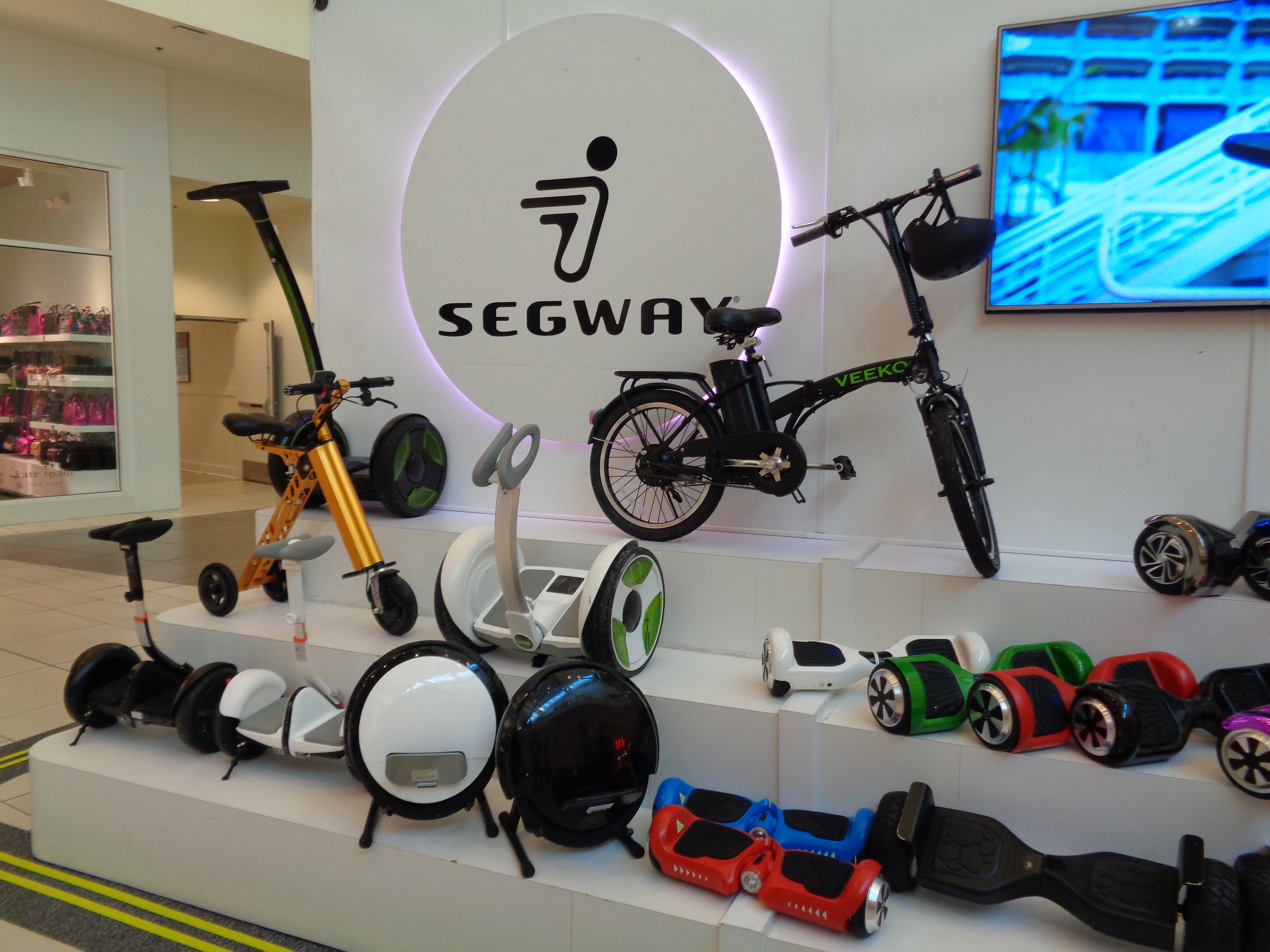
Sport vehicles

- Sportswear
  - Away colours
  - Third jersey
    - City Connect
  - Throwback uniform
    - Turn Back the Clock
  - Team jersey
    - Basketball sleeve
    - Cycling jersey
    - Hockey jersey
    - Guernsey
    - Rugby shirt
    - Scrimmage vest
  - Footwear
    - Baseball stirrups
    - Cycling shoe
    - Cleats
      - Football boot
      - Track spikes
      - Ice cleat
      - Crampon
    - Motorcycle boot
    - Racing flat
      - Super shoes
    - Racing shoes
    - Skates
      - Ice skates
        - Figure skates
      - Roller skates
        - Inline skates
        - Quad skates
    - Socks
      - Hockey sock
      - Rugby socks
    - Wrestling shoes
  - Pants
    - Cycling shorts
    - Hockey pants
    - Plus fours
    - Rugby shorts
  - Protective equipment
    - Eyewear
      - Diving mask
      - Shooting glasses
      - Swedish goggles
    - Gloves
      - Ash guard
      - Bat and ball sports
        - Baseball
          - Baseball glove
          - Batting glove
        - Wicket-keeper's gloves
      - Combat sports
        - Boxing glove
          - Hand wrap
        - MMA gloves
      - Cycling glove
      - Driving glove
      - Focus mitt
      - Hand guard
        - Grip
      - Ice hockey glove
        - Blocker
        - Trapper
      - Lacrosse glove
      - Weightlifting gloves
    - Headgear
      - Caps
        - Baseball cap
        - Casquette
        - Cricket cap
          - Baggy green
        - Sports visor
      - Helmets
        - Association football headgear
        - Batting helmet
        - Bicycle helmet
        - Cricket helmet
        - Equestrian helmet
        - Football helmet
          - Eyeshield
          - Face mask
          - Guardian Cap
        - Hockey helmet
        - Lacrosse helmet
        - Martial arts headgear
          - Wrestling headgear
        - Motorcycle helmet
        - Racing helmet
        - Scrum cap
        - Ski helmet
        - Water polo cap
    - Bōgu
    - Compression garment
      - Finger sleeve
      - Basketball sleeve
      - Leg sleeve
    - HANS device
    - Hutchens device
    - Hogu
    - Jockstrap
      - Athletic cup
    - Mouthguard
    - Neck guard
    - Pads
      - Leg pads
      - Elbow pad
      - Knee pad
      - Shoulder pad
    - Racing suit
    - Shin guard
    - Throat guard
    - Wrist guard
    - Ice hockey goaltending equipment
      - Goaltender mask
    - Motorcycle personal protective equipment
      - Motorcycle armor
    - Protective equipment in gridiron football
  - Baseball uniform
  - Basketball uniform
  - Cricket whites
  - Cycling kit
  - Ice hockey uniform
    - NHL uniform
  - Martial arts uniform
    - Brazilian jiu-jitsu gi
    - Dobok
    - Keikogi
      - Obi
    - Karate gi
    - Judogi
    - Mixed martial arts clothing
    - Võ phục
    - Wrestling singlet
  - Ski suit
  - Snowmobile suit
  - Soccer kit
- Clubs
  - Bat
    - Baseball bat
      - Composite baseball bat
      - Pink bat
      - Baseball doughnut
    - Cricket bat
      - ComBat
  - Racket
    - Tennis
      - Strings
      - Spaghetti racquet
    - Table tennis racket
      - Table tennis rubber
      - Speed glue
  - Stick
    - Cue stick
    - Hockey sticks
      - Field hockey stick
      - Ice hockey stick
    - Hurley
    - Golf club
      - Wood
      - Iron
        - Wedge
      - Hybrid
      - Putter
    - Lacrosse stick
- Line marker
- Machines
  - Stringing machine
  - Throwing machine
    - Bowling machine
    - Pitching machine
  - Water hog
- Projectiles
  - Ball
    - Basketball
    - Basque pelota ball
    - Bat and ball sports
      - Baseball
      - Cricket ball
    - Billiard ball
    - Bowling ball
    - Cage ball
    - Exercise ball
    - Football
      - Gridiron football
      - Soccer ball
        - Penny floater
      - Gaelic ball
      - Rugby ball
    - Bandy ball
    - Golf ball
      - Park golf ball
    - Lacrosse ball
    - Marble
    - Medicine ball
    - Rhythmic gymnastics
    - Sliotar
    - Bouncy ball
      - Spaldeen
    - Tennis ball
      - Tape ball
    - Utility ball
    - Vaqueta ball
    - Volleyball
    - Water polo ball
  - Hockey puck
  - Shuttlecock
  - Frisbee
  - Airsoft pellets
- Tee
- Targets
  - Shooting target
    - Steel target
  - Bullseye
  - Bowling pin
- Vehicles
  - Non motorized
    - Boards
      - Snowboard
      - Surfboard
        - Foilboard
      - Skateboard
        - Freeboard
      - Caster board
    - Kick scooter
    - Pedal vehicle
      - Cycling
        - Bicycle
          - Recumbent bicycle
        - Tricycle
          - Handcycle
        - Quadricycle
        - Unicycle
      - Human-powered aircraft
      - Watercraft
        - Amphibious cycle
        - Hydrocycle
        - Human-powered hydrofoil
        - Pedalo
    - Oar and Paddle
      - Kayak
      - Packraft
      - Racing shell
        - Coxed pair
        - Coxless pair
        - Coxed four
        - Coxless four
        - Eight
    - Sailing
      - Sloop
      - Sailing hydrofoil
      - International DN
  - Motorized
    - Car
      - Bullpen car
      - Golf cart
      - Safety car
      - Open-wheel car
        - Formula One car
      - Paintball tank
    - Motorcycle
      - Enduro motorcycle
      - Electric dragbike
      - Pit bike
    - Electric skateboard
    - E-scooter
- Weapons
  - Bow
    - Compound bow
    - Recurve bow
    - Yumi
  - Fencing
    - Épée
    - Foil
    - Sabre
  - Guns
    - Airsoft gun
    - Laser pistol
    - Paintball marker
    - Gel blaster
  - Waster
    - Bokken
    - Shinai
  - List of martial arts weapons
    - List of practice weapons
- Officiant equipment
  - Christmas tree
  - Cricket
    - Ball gauge
    - Stump gauge
  - Penalty card
  - Penalty flag
  - Racing flags
  - Scoring gauge
  - Vanishing spray
  - Whistle
- Timekeeping
  - Chess clock
  - Pitch clock
  - Shot clock
    - Play clock
- Baseball clothing and equipment
- Caving equipment
- Climbing equipment
  - Rock-climbing equipment
- Cricket clothing and equipment
- Cue sport equipment
  - Billiard table
    - Baize
  - Rack
- Exercise equipment
  - Elliptical trainer
  - Stationary bicycle
  - Bicycle trainer
  - Bicycle rollers
  - Treadmill
    - Treadmill desk
    - Treadmill with Vibration Isolation Stabilization
  - Wall bars
  - Bulgarian bag
  - Bell
    - Barbell
    - Dumbbell
    - Kettlebell
- Golf equipment
  - Ball washer
- Gymnastics
  - Parallettes
  - Artistic
    - Balance beam
    - Floor
    - Horizontal bar
    - Parallel bars
    - Pommel horse
    - Rings
    - Uneven bars
    - Vault
  - Rhythmic
    - Ball
    - Clubs
    - Hoop
    - Ribbon
    - Rope
- Ice hockey equipment
- Martial arts equipment
  - Hojo undō
    - Makiwara
  - Mu ren zhuang
  - Punching bag
- Motorcycle riding gear
- Paintball equipment
- Rugby union equipment
  - Scrum machine
- Skiing equipment
  - Ski
  - Ski binding
  - Ski pole
  - Ski skins
- Triathlon equipment

=== Variations of sports ===
Official Association football variations

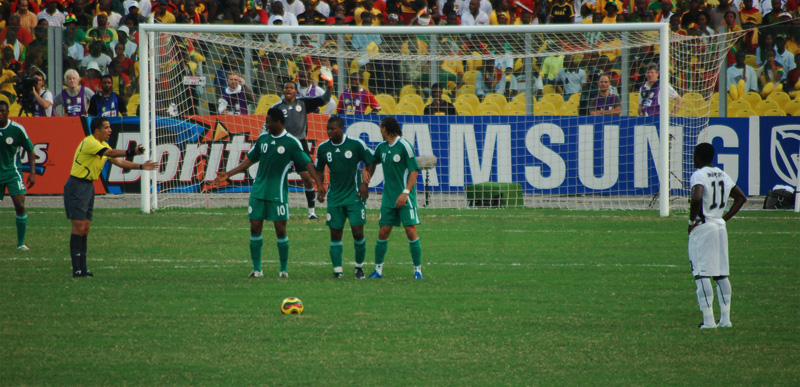
Soccer

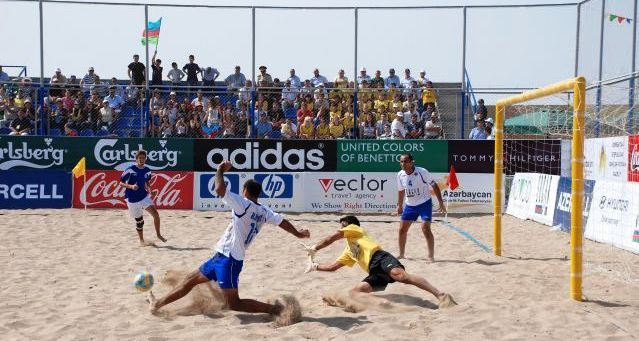
Beach soccer

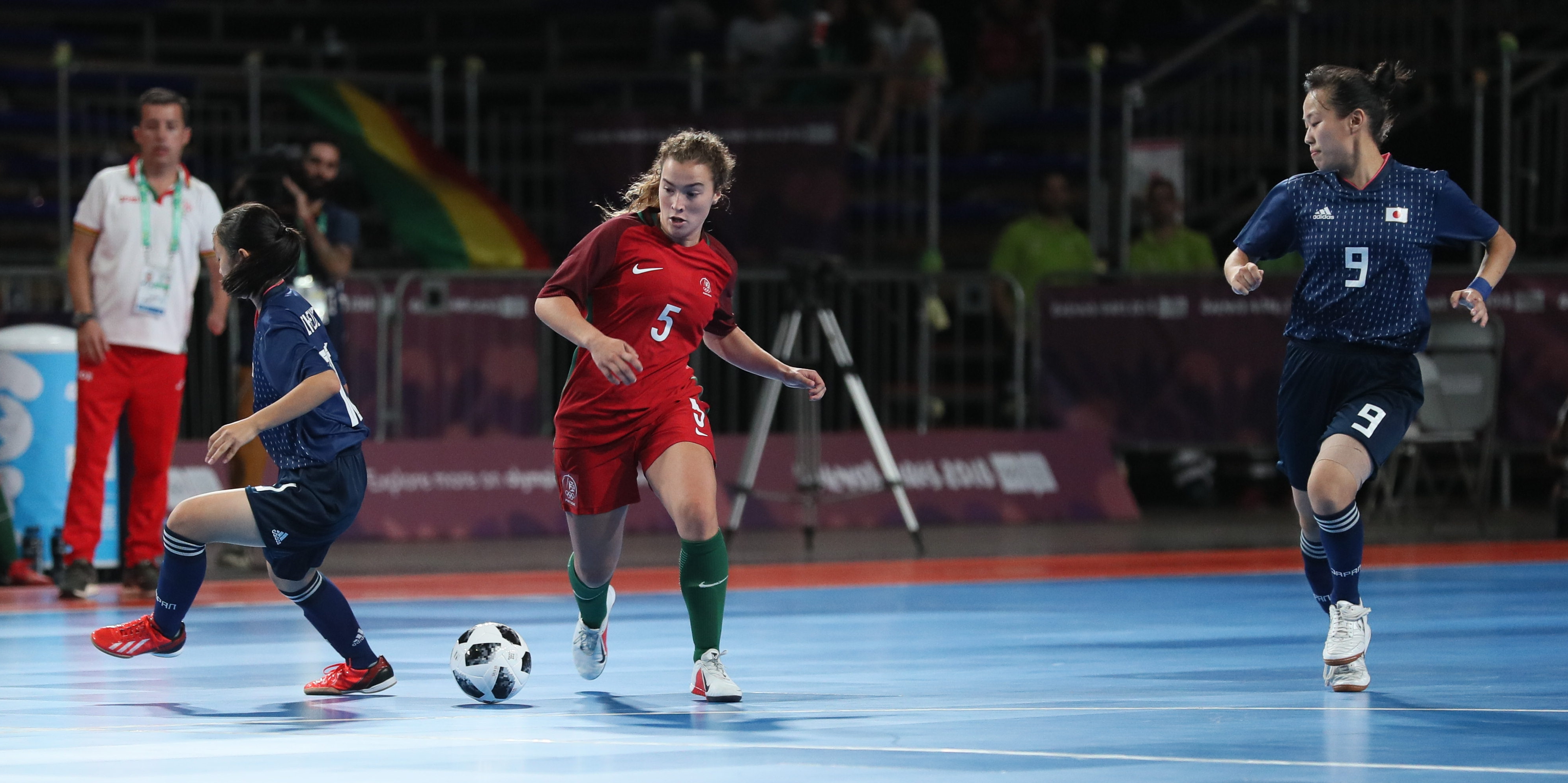
Futsal

Official Baseball variations

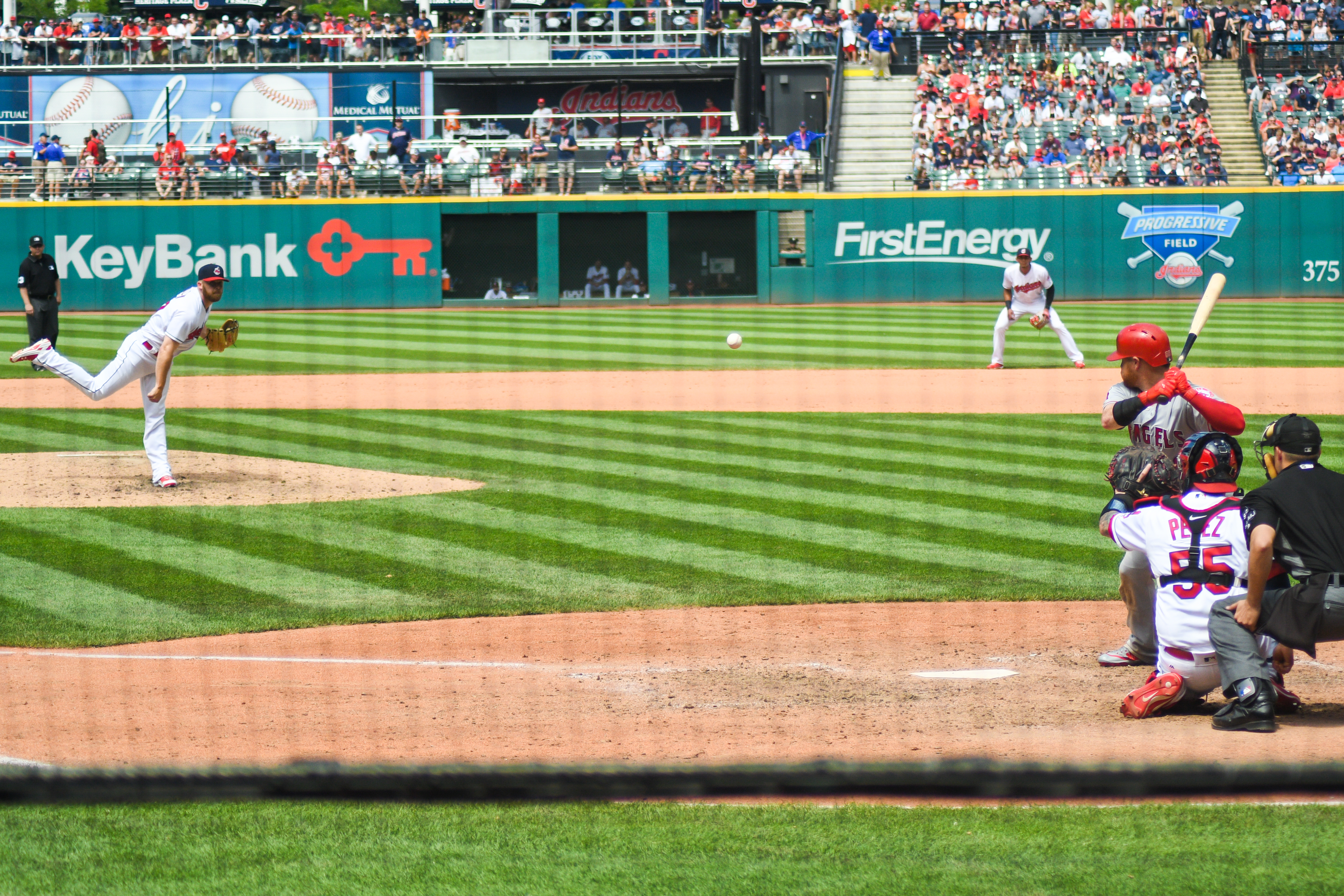
Hardball

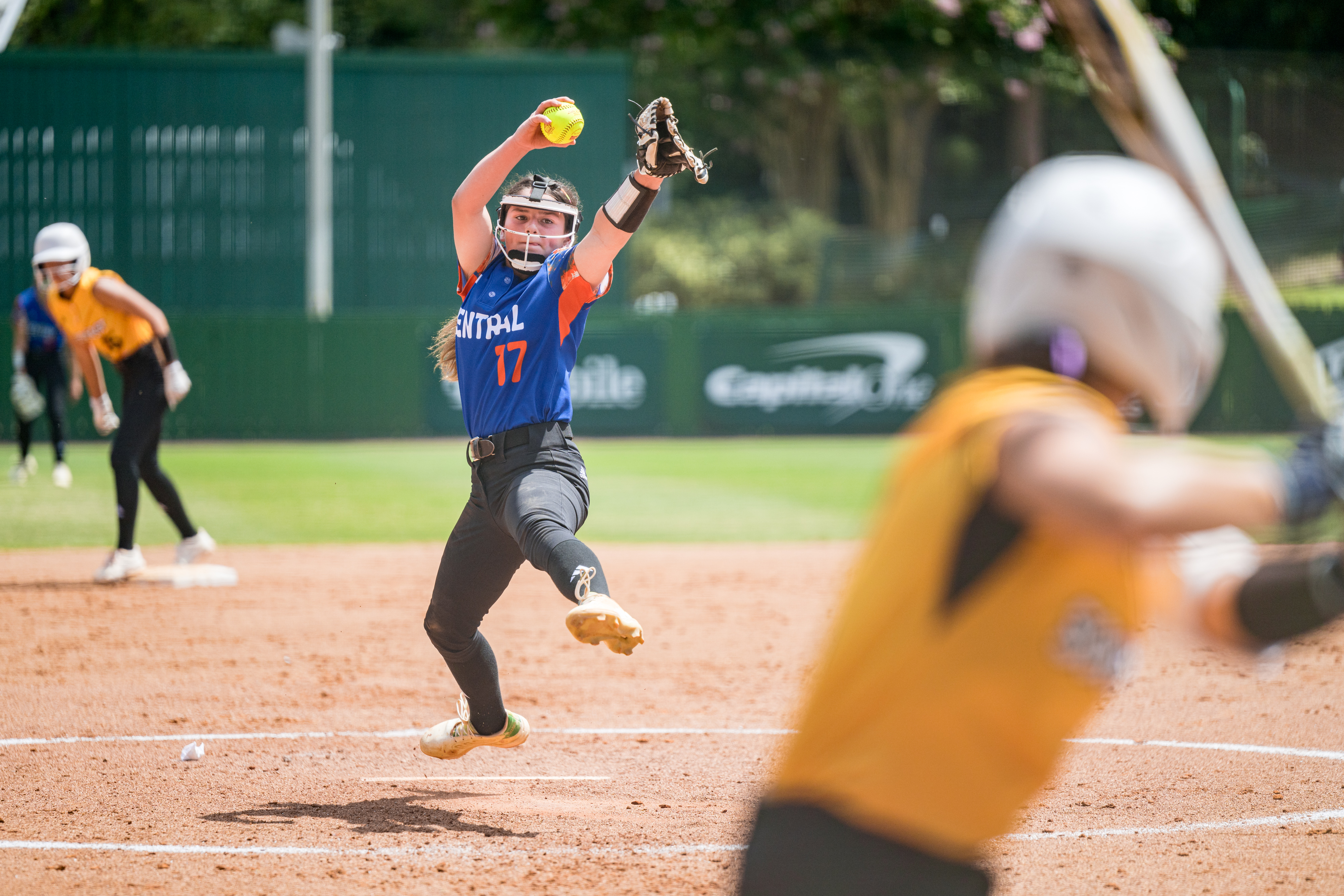
Softball

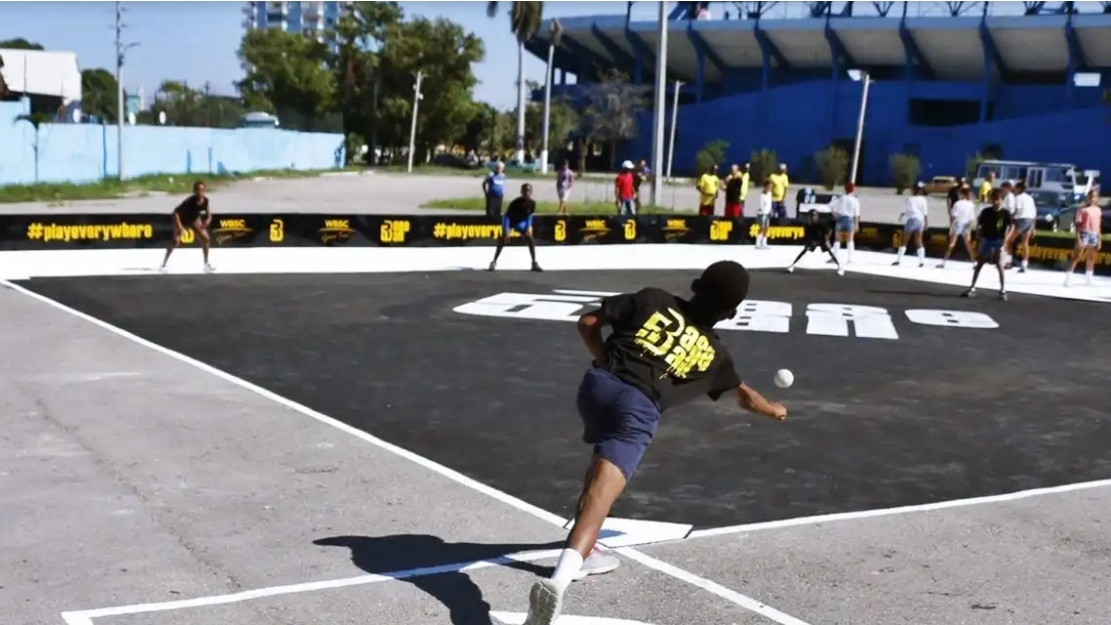
Baseball5

- Variations of basketball
- Bat and ball sports
  - Variations of baseball
  - Forms of cricket
- List of chess variants
- List of dodgeball variations
- List of types of football
  - Variations of Australian rules football
- Variations of golf
- Variations of kabaddi
- Paintball variations
- Volleyball variations

=== Comparison of sports ===
Comparing field dimensions and fielding positioning between baseball and cricket
- Bat and ball sports
  - Comparison of baseball and cricket
  - Comparison of baseball and softball
  - Comparison of Major League Baseball and Nippon Professional Baseball
- Combat sports
  - Comparison of karate styles
  - Comparison of professional wrestling and mixed martial arts
- Comparison of cue sports
- Football codes
  - Comparison of American and Canadian football
  - Comparison of American football and rugby league
  - Comparison of American football and rugby union
  - Comparison of association football and rugby union
  - Comparison of Gaelic football and Australian rules football
  - Comparison of Canadian football and rugby league
  - Comparison of Canadian football and rugby union
  - Comparison of Gaelic football and Australian rules football
  - Comparison of Gaelic football and rugby union
  - Comparison of rugby league and rugby union
  - Comparisons between the NFL and NCAA football

=== Governing bodies ===
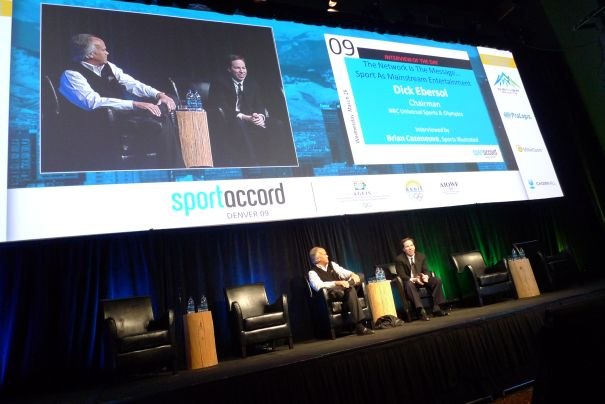
A SportAccord convention

World governing bodies of various notable sports:

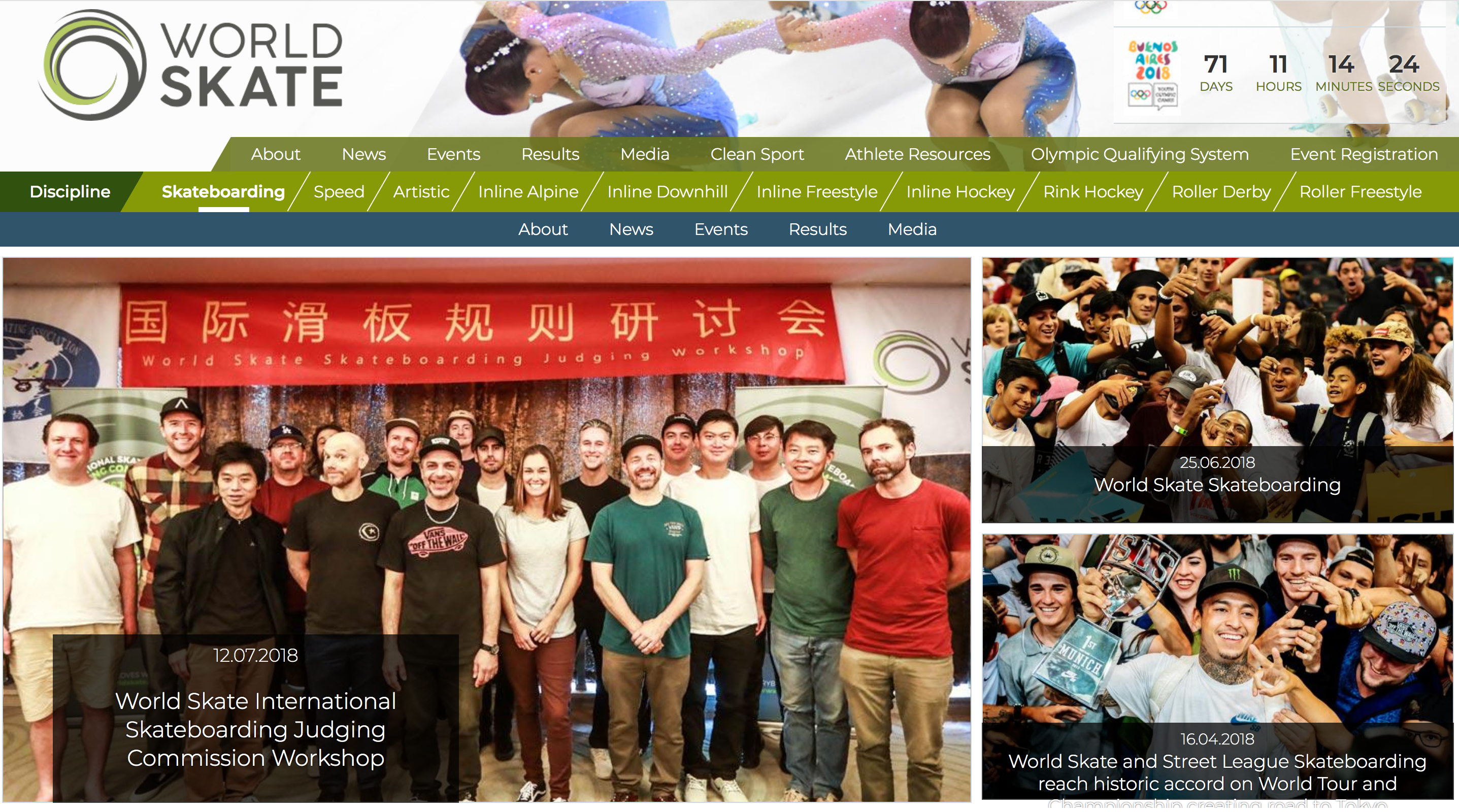
World Skate is the governing body over roller sports

- Multisports:
  - Olympic Games: International Olympic Committee (IOC)
    - SportAccord
      - Association of Summer Olympic International Federations (ASOIF)
      - Winter Olympic Federations (WOF)
      - Association of IOC Recognised International Sports Federations (ARISF)
      - Alliance of Independent Recognised Members of Sport (AIMS)
  - World Games: International World Games Association (IWGA)
- Air sports: Fédération Aéronautique Internationale (FIA)
- Archery: World Archery
- Athletics: World Athletics
- Basketball: FIBA (International Basketball Federation), but national pro leagues may diverge from its rules, as in the US
- Bat and ball sports
  - Baseball, Baseball5 and Softball: World Baseball Softball Confederation (WBSC)
  - Cricket: International Cricket Council (ICC)
- Boules: World Pétanque and Bowls Federation (WPBF)
  - Bocce: Confederazione Boccistica Internazionale (CBI)
  - Bocce volo: Fédération Internationale de Boules (FIB)
  - Pétanque and jeu provençal: Fédération Internationale de Pétanque et Jeu Provençal (FIPJP)
- Bowling: International Bowling Federation (IBF)
- Canoeing: Paddle Worldwide
- Cheerleading: International Cheer Union (ICU)
- Combat sports
  - Boxing: World Boxing
  - Budō
    - Aikido: International Aikido Federation (IAF)
    - Judo: International Judo Federation (IJF)
    - Jujutsu: Ju-Jitsu International Federation (JJIF)
    - Karate: World Karate Federation (WKF)
    - Kendo: International Kendo Federation (FIK)
    - Sumo: International Sumo Federation (IFS)
  - Fencing: International Fencing Federation (FIE)
  - Kickboxing: World Association of Kickboxing Organizations (WAKO)
  - Mixed Martial Arts: International Mixed Martial Arts Federation (IMMAF), Global Association of Mixed Martial Arts (GAMMA), United World Wrestling (UWW), and Asian Mixed Martial Arts Association (AMMA)
  - Muay Thai: International Federation of Muaythai Associations (IFMA)
  - Taekwondo: World Taekwondo
  - Wrestling and International grappling United World Wrestling (UWW)
  - Wushu: International Wushu Federation (IWUF)
- Cue sports: World Confederation of Billiards Sports (WCBS)
  - Carom billiards: Union Mondiale de Billard (UMB)
  - Pocket billiards (pool): World Pool-Billiard Association (WPA)
  - Snooker and English billiards: World Professional Billiards and Snooker Association (WPBSA or World Snooker)
- Curling: World Curling
- Cycling: Union Cycliste International (UCI)
- Equestrianism: International Federation for Equestrian Sports (FEI)
- Football variants have many governing bodies, with widely divergent rules:
  - Association football (soccer): FIFA
  - Gridiron football is divided in into:
    - American football: International Federation of American Football (IFAF) is the world governing body, but U.S. domestic leagues at professional and college levels may diverge from its rules
    - Canadian football: Football Canada
  - Rugby football is divided into two "codes" or sets of rules:
    - Rugby league: International Rugby League (IRL)
    - Rugby union: World Rugby
  - Australian rules football: AFL Commission
  - Gaelic football: Gaelic Athletic Association (GAA)
  - International-rules football: A conference of the AFL and GAA
- Frisbee sports: World Flying Disc Federation (WFDF)
- Gymnastics: World Gymnastics
- Golf: International Golf Federation (IGF)
- Handball: International Handball Federation (IHF)
- Hockey
  - Bandy: Federation of International Bandy (FIB)
  - Field hockey: International Hockey Federation (IHF)
  - Ice hockey: International Ice Hockey Federation (IIHF)
  - Floorball: International Floorball Federation (IFF)
- Ice skating: International Skating Union (ISU)
- Korfball: International Korfball Federation (IKF)
- Lacrosse: World Lacrosse
- Motorsports:
  - Auto racing: International Federation of the Automobile (FIA)
  - Motorcycle racing: International Motorcycling Federation (FIM)
  - Offshore and Inshore powerboat racing: International Motonautical Union (UIM) and others, depending on boat type
- Multisport racing
  - Biathlon: International Biathlon Union (IBU)
  - Triathlon: World Triathlon
- Net and wall sports
  - Basque pelota: International Federation of Basque Pelota (FIPV)
  - Badminton: Badminton World Federation (BWF)
  - Squash: World Squash
  - Table tennis: International Table Tennis Federation (ITTF)
  - Tennis: World Tennis
  - Sepak takraw: International Sepaktakraw Federation (ISTAF)
  - Teqball: International Teqball Federation (FITEQ)
  - Fistball: International Fistball Association (IFA)
  - Volleyball: Fédération Internationale de Volleyball (FIVB)
- Netball: World Netball
- Olympic weightlifting: International Weightlifting Federation (IWF)
- Polo: Federation of International Polo (FIP)
- Roller sports: World Skate
- Rowing: World Rowing
- Sailing: World Sailing
- Skiing & Snowboarding: International Ski and Snowboard Federation (FIS)
- Sledding
  - Bobsleigh & Skeleton: International Bobsleigh and Skeleton Federation (IBSF)
  - Luge: International Luge Federation (FIL)
- Sport climbing: World Climbing
- Surfing: International Surfing Association (ISA)
- Swimming and Water polo: World Aquatics
- Underwater sports: Confédération Mondiale des Activités Subaquatiques (CMAS)
- Water skiing & wakeboarding: International Waterski & Wakeboard Federation (IWWF)

== Sport technology ==
- TrackMan
- Wavelight
- Technology doping
  - Mechanical doping

=== Officiating technology ===
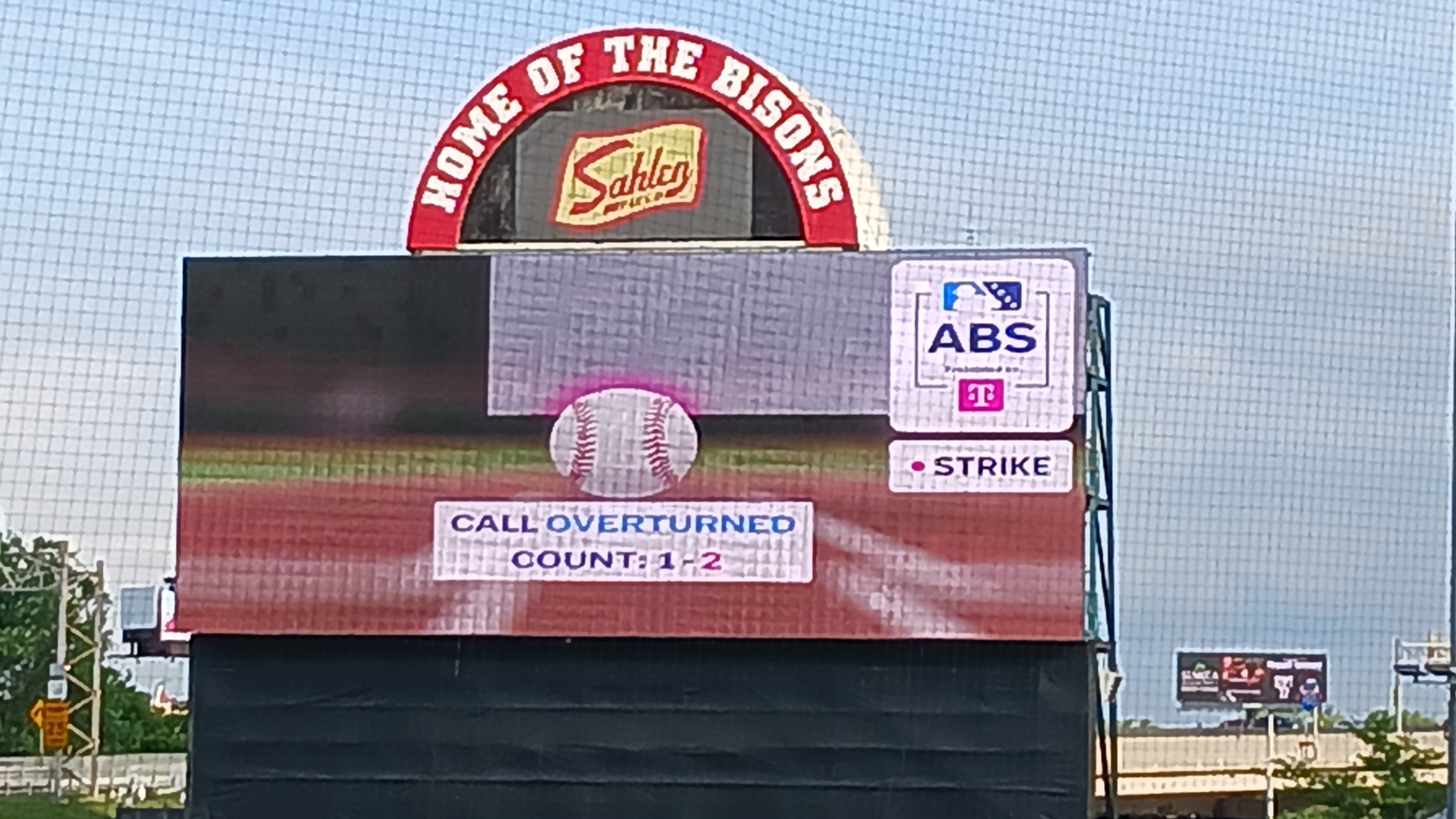
ABS System

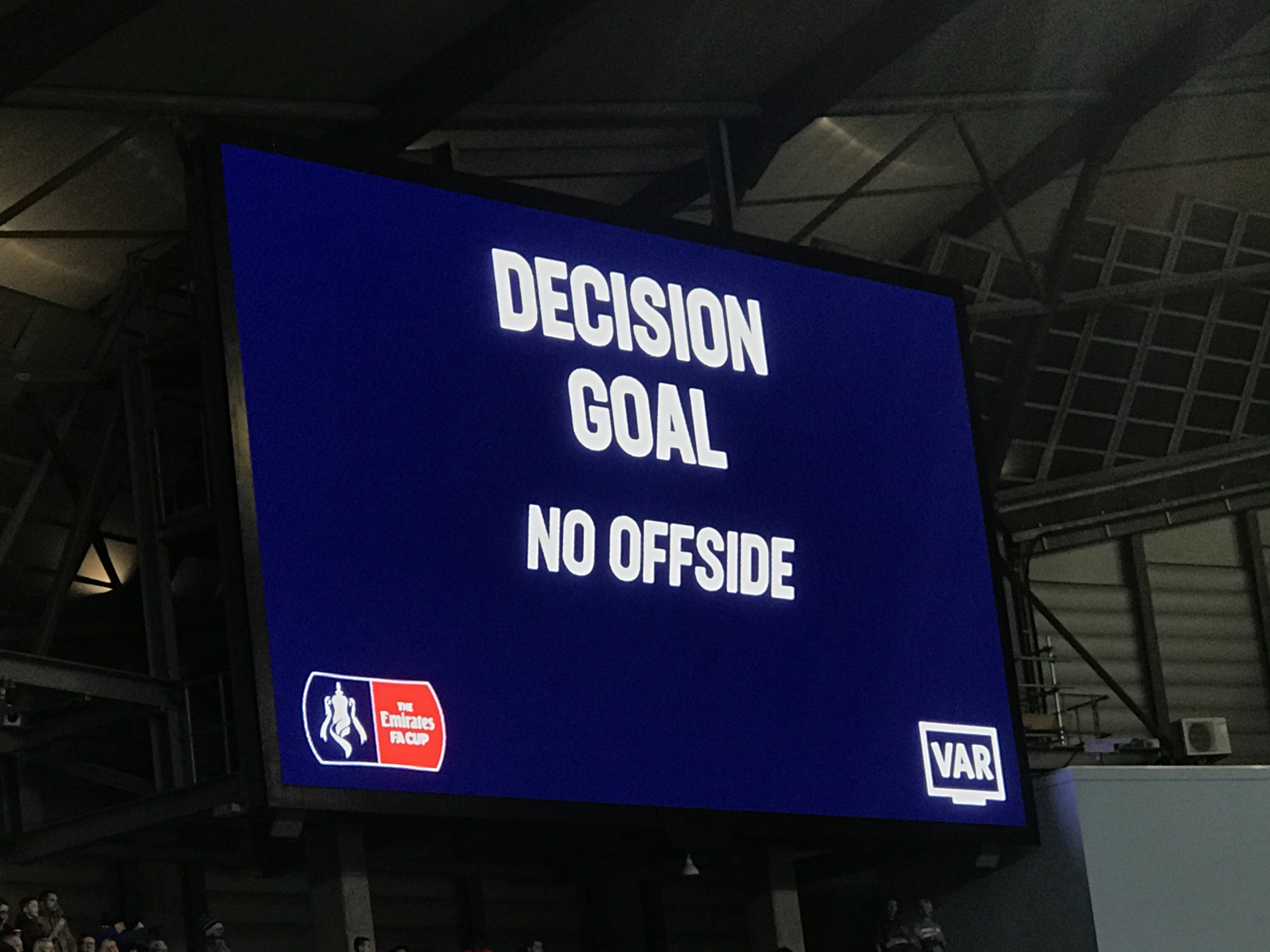
VAR

- Aquatic timing system
- Automated Ball-Strike System
- Automated Boxing Scoring System
- Automatic scorer
- Decision Review System
  - Hot Spot
  - Snickometer
- Electronic line judge
  - Cyclops
- Electronic scoring system
- Eye on the Hog
- Football
  - Video assistant referee
    - Football video support
  - Goal-line technology
    - GoalRef
  - Semi-automated offside technology
- Fully automatic time
- Hawk-Eye
- Instant replay
- Photo finish
- Lamé
  - Body cord

== Sport linguistics ==
- List of sports clichés
- List of sports idioms
  - Glossary of English-language idioms derived from baseball
- Football (word)
  - Names for association football
  - Names of Australian rules football

=== Glosaries ===
Historic bowling glossaries
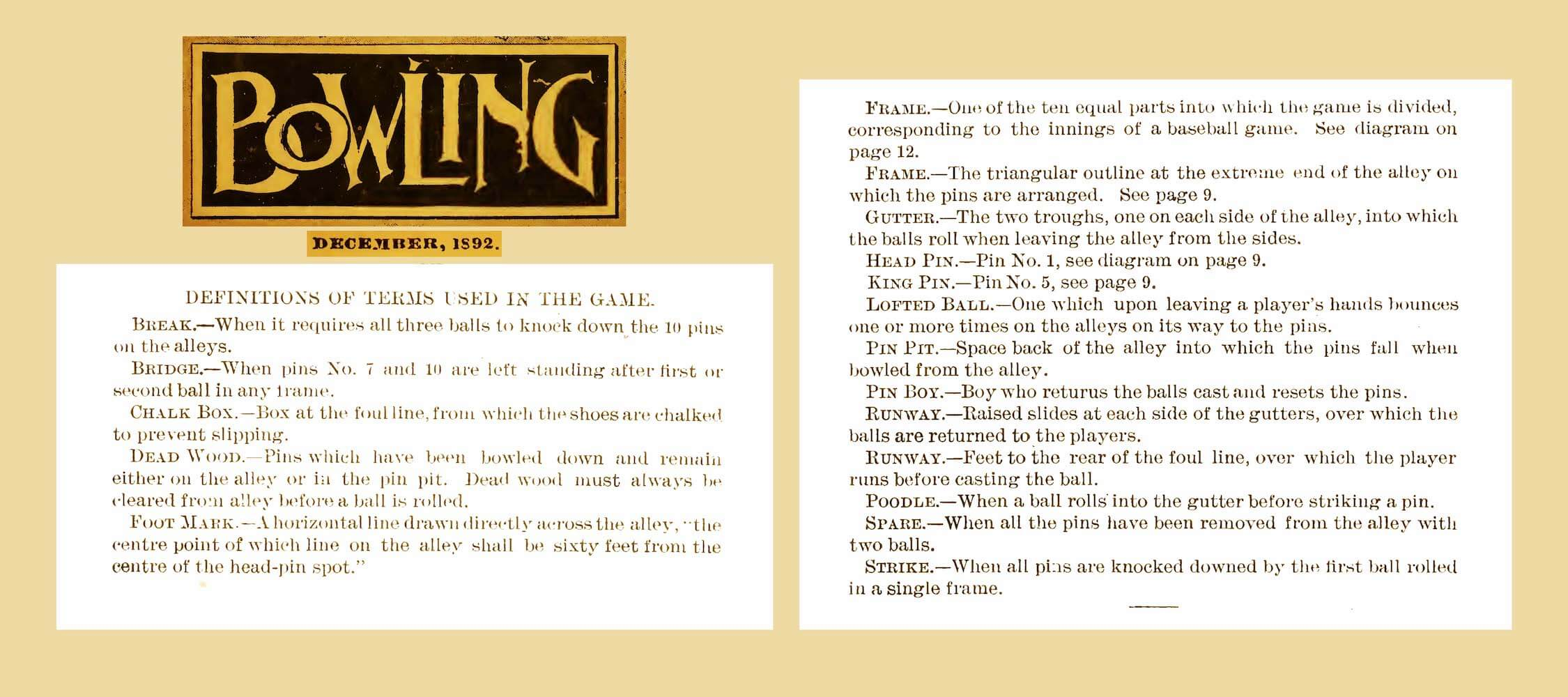
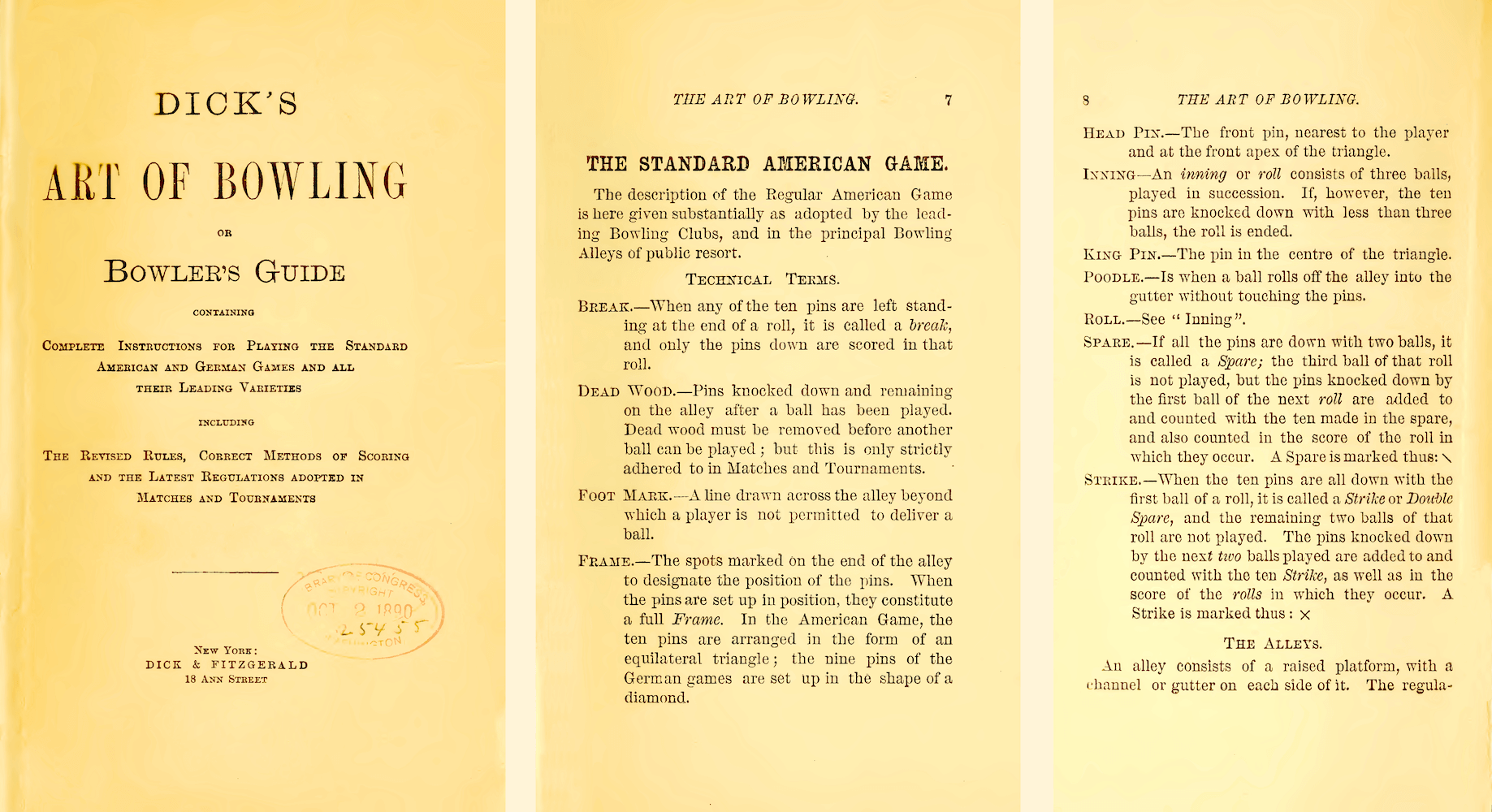
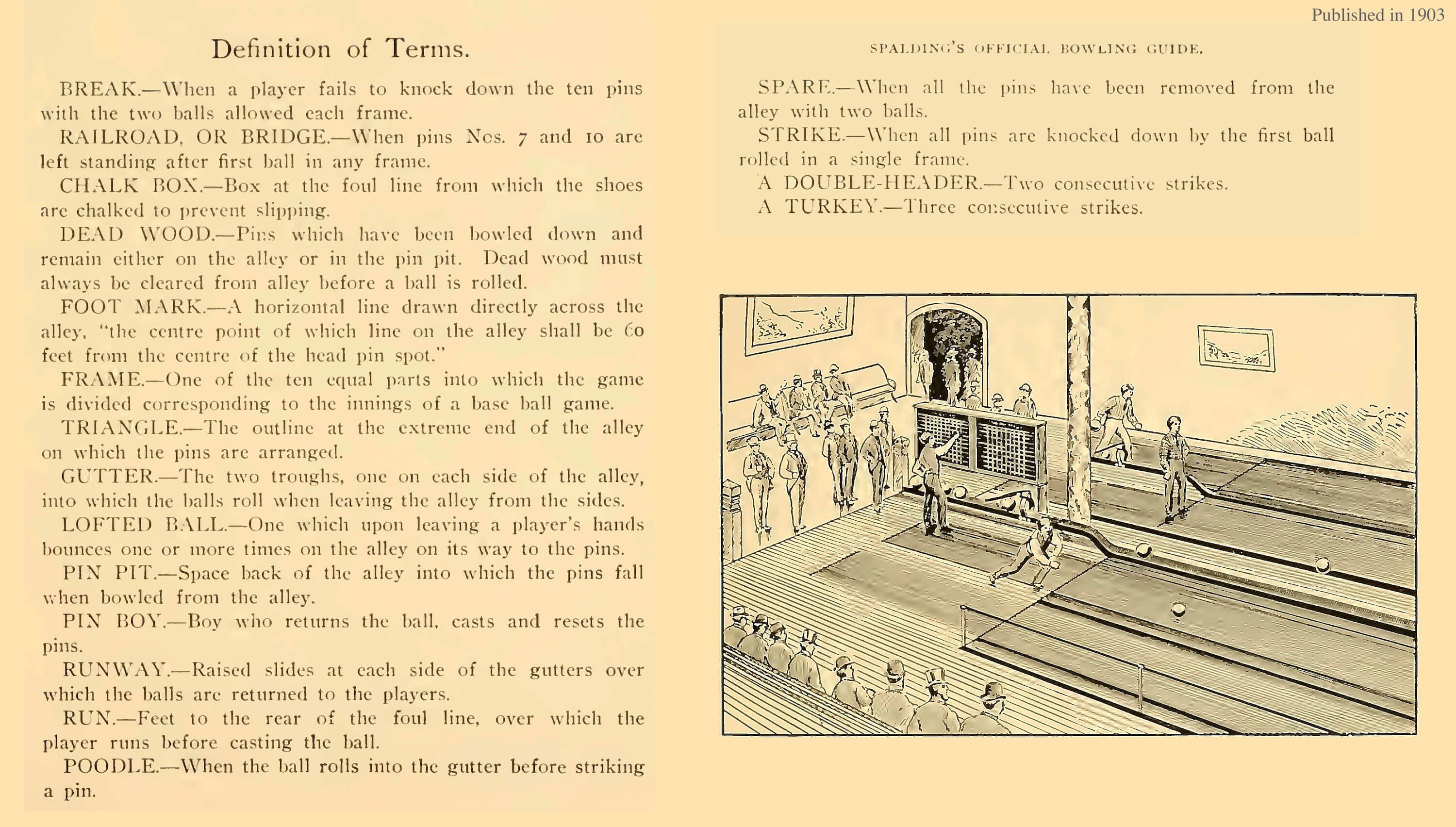
- Bat and ball sports
  - Glossary of baseball terms
  - Glossary of Baseball5 terms
  - Glossary of cricket terms
- Combat sports
  - Glossary of fencing
    - Glossary of Italian fencing terms
  - Glossary of professional wrestling terms
  - Glossary of sumo terms
  - Glossary of Wing Chun terms
  - List of karate terms
- Equestrian
  - Glossary of equestrian terms
  - Glossary of Australian and New Zealand punting
  - Glossary of North American horse racing
- Football codes
  - Glossary of American football terms
  - Glossary of association football terms
  - Glossary of Australian rules football
  - Glossary of Canadian football terms
  - Glossary of rugby league terms
  - Glossary of rugby union terms
- Gymnastics
  - Glossary of gymnastics terms
  - Trampolining terms
- Mind sports
  - Glossary of board games
  - Glossary of chess
    - Glossary of chess problems
    - Glossary of computer chess terms
  - Glossary of card game terms
    - Glossary of blackjack terms
    - Glossary of contract bridge terms
    - Glossary of patience terms
    - Glossary of poker terms
    - Glossary of Skat terms
    - Schafkopf language
  - Glossary of domino terms
  - Glossary of pinball terms
  - Glossary of Sudoku
  - Glossary of tables game terms
  - Glossary of video game terms
  - List of Go terms
  - Role-playing game terms
- Motor sports
  - Glossary of motorcycling terms
  - Glossary of motorsport terms
- Net and wall sports
  - Glossary of pickleball
  - Glossary of table tennis
  - Glossary of tennis terms
  - Volleyball jargon
- Tag sports
  - Glossary of kabaddi terms
  - Glossary of kho kho terms
- Glossary of archery terms
- Glossary of basketball terms
- Glossary of bowling
- Glossary of bowls terms
- Glossary of climbing terms
- Glossary of cue sports terms
- Glossary of curling
- Glossary of cycling
- Glossary of darts
- Glossary of disc golf terms
- Glossary of figure skating terms
- Glossary of Gaelic games terms
- Glossary of golf
- Glossary of ice hockey terms
- Glossary of rowing terms
- Glossary of skiing and snowboarding terms
- Glossary of surfing
- Glossary of water polo

== Sport participants ==
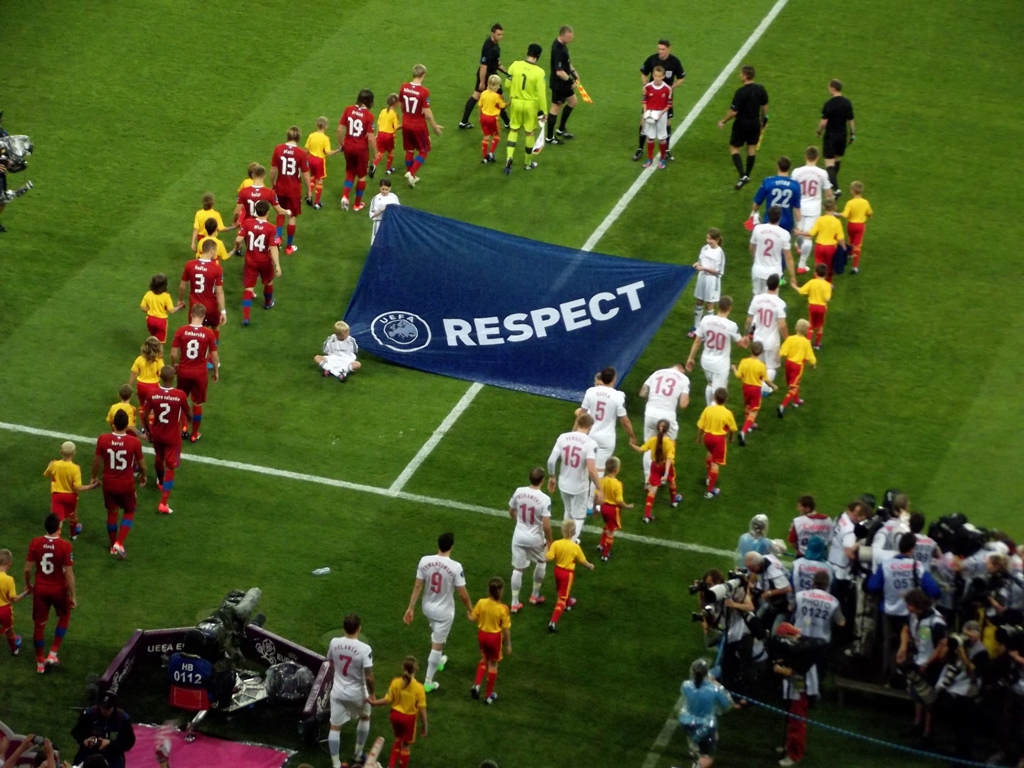
Journalists, referees, players and their scorts

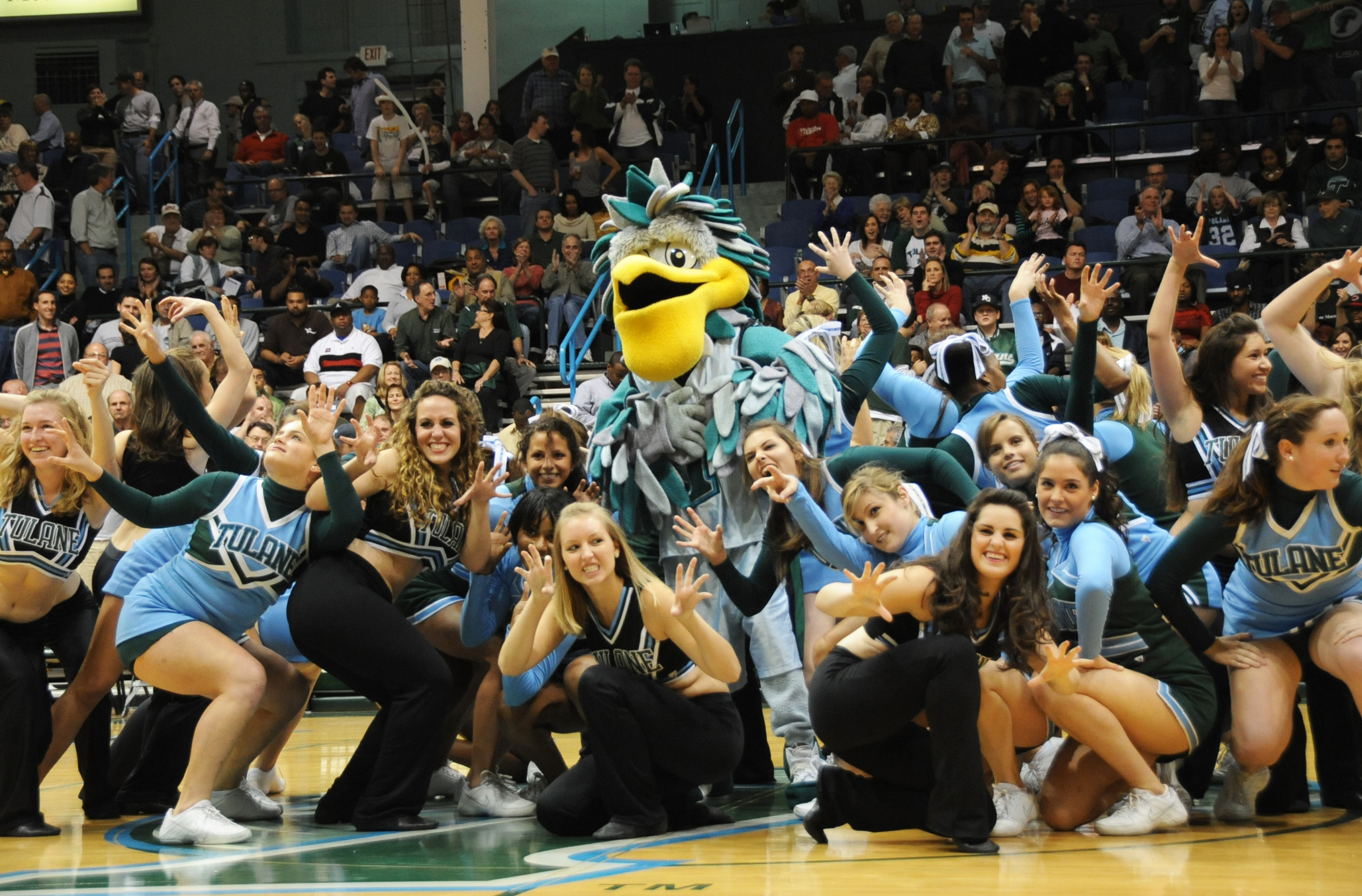
Cheerleaders and mascot

- Athlete
  - Student athlete
  - Double international
  - Franchise player
  - Journeyman
  - Marquee player
  - Prospect
  - Replacement player
  - Football player
  - Jockey
  - Professional golfer
  - Position
    - Captain
      - Vice-captain
      - Association football
      - Baseball
      - Cricket)
      - Gaelic games
      - Ice hockey
      - Volleyball
    - Goalkeeper
      - Association football
      - Handball
      - Ice hockey
      - Gaelic games
      - Water polo
      - Field lacrosse
      - Box lacrosse
    - Winger
    - Swingman
    - Two-way player
    - Utility player
    - Basketball
      - Point guard
      - Shooting guard
      - Small forward
      - Power forward
      - Center
    - Bat and ball sports
      - Baseball
        - Utility player
        - Leadoff hitter
        - Pinch hitter
        - Pinch runner
        - Pitcher
          - Starting pitcher
          - Relief pitcher
            - Left-handed specialist
            - Long reliever
            - Middle reliever
            - Setup man
            - Closer
        - Position player
          - Catcher
          - Infielder
            - First baseman
            - Second baseman
            - Third baseman
            - Shortstop
          - Outfielder
            - Left fielder
            - Center fielder
            - Right fielder
          - Designated hitter
      - Cricket
        - All-rounder
        - Wicket-keeper
        - Runner
        - Nightwatchman
        - Pinch hitter
    - Curling
      - Lead
      - Second
      - Third
      - Skip
    - Football codes
      - American football
        - Lineman
        - Offense
          - Center
          - Guard
          - Tackle
          - Quarterback
          - Running back
            - Halfback
            - Fullback
          - Wide receiver
          - Slotback
          - H-back
          - Tight end
        - Defense
          - Defensive tackle
          - Defensive end
          - Linebacker
          - Defensive back
          - Cornerback
          - Safety
          - Nickelback
        - Special team
          - Kickoff specialist
          - Placekicker
          - Punter
          - Holder
          - Long snapper
          - Return specialist
          - Upback
          - Gunner
          - Jammer
      - Canadian football
        - Halfback
      - Association football
        - Defender
        - Midfielder
        - Forward
      - Australian football
      - Rugby
        - League
          - Five-eighth
          - Fullback
          - Hooker
        - Union
          - Flanker
    - Gaelic games
    - Ice hockey
      - Rover
      - Defenceman
      - Forward
        - Centre
        - Winger
    - Lacrosse
      - Midfielder
- Coach
  - Head coach
  - Player coach
  - Coaching staff
  - American football
    - Offensive coordinator
    - Defensive coordinator
    - Special teams coordinator
    - Position coach
  - Baseball manager
    - Baseball coach
  - Basketball
  - Gaelic games
  - Ice hockey
  - Soccer
    - Caretaker manager
- Caddie
- Officiant
  - Commissaire
  - Gamemaster
  - Official
    - Gridiron football
    - Ice hockey
    - Touch judge
    - Rugby union
    - Rugby league
      - Touch match officials
    - Tennis
  - Referee
    - Boxing
    - Soccer
      - Assistant referee
      - Futsal
  - Umpire
    - Australian rules football
    - Baseball
    - Cricket
    - Field hockey
  - Sailing
    - International Judge of Sailing
    - International Measurer of Sailing
    - International Race Officer of Sailing
    - International Umpire of Sailing
  - Sumo
    - Gyōji
    - Judge
- Team physician
- Athletic trainer
- Selector
- Scout
  - Association football
- Sporting director
- Sports agent
- Sports commentator
- Ring announcer
- Cheerleader
  - NBA cheerleading
  - NFL cheerleading
  - NHL cheerleading
- Mascot
  - List of Olympic mascots
  - List of Paralympic mascots
  - List of association football mascots
    - List of FIFA World Cup official mascots
    - List of UEFA European Championship official mascots
    - List of AFC Asian Cup official mascots
    - List of Copa América official mascots
    - List of Africa Cup of Nations official mascots
  - List of Major League Baseball mascots
  - List of NBA mascots
  - List of WNBA Mascots
  - List of NFL mascots
  - List of NHL mascots
  - List of college mascots in the United States
- Ball boy
- Bat boy
- Player escort
- Podium girl
- Ring girl
- Stadium organist
- Tipster
- Fan
- Sports chaplain
- Animals in sport
  - Sport horse

== Game play ==
=== Estrategy and tactics ===
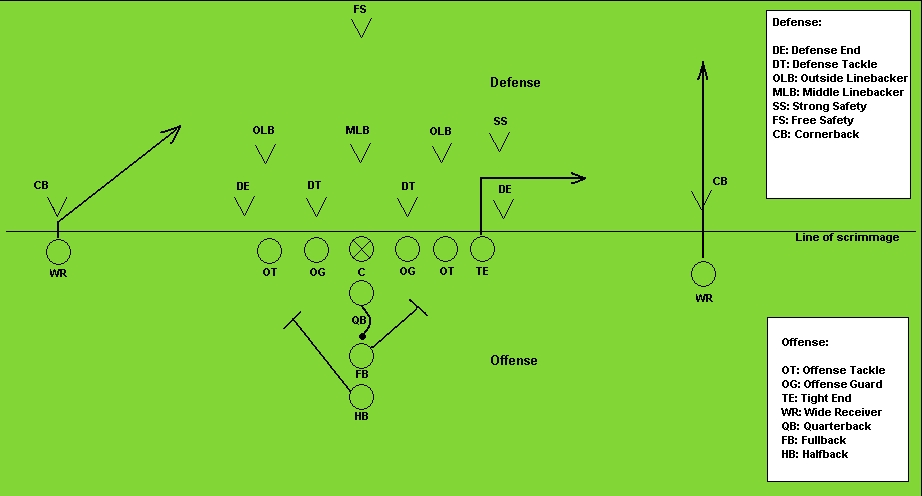
American football play diagram

- Gameplay
- Defense
  - Man-to-man defense
  - Zone defense
- Offense
- Give-and-go
- Hidden ball trick
- Delay of game
  - Running out the clock
- Running up the score
- Possession (sports)
  - Rebound (sports)
  - Interception
  - Turnover
    - Basketball
    - Gridiron football
- Telegraphing
- Platoon system
- Depth chart
- Starting lineup
- Substitution
  - Resting the starters
  - Association football
  - Cricket
  - Baseball
    - Lefty-righty switch
    - Defensive substitution
      - Double switch
- Bat and ball sports
  - Batting order
    - Baseball
    - Cricket
  - Baseball
    - Inside baseball
    - Small ball
      - Stolen base
      - Hit and run
      - Bunt
        - Sacrifice bunt
          - Squeeze play
      - Sacrifice fly
    - Whiteyball
    - Baseball positioning
      - Infield shift
  - Cricket
    - Bodyline
    - Declaration and forfeiture
    - Fielding
      - Restrictions
        - Powerplay
    - Follow-on
    - Leg theory
    - Off theory
- Basketball
  - Basketball playbook
  - Box-and-one defense
  - Match-up zone defense
  - Triangle-and-two defense
  - Alley-oop
  - Run and gun
  - Small ball
- Ice hockey
  - Backcheck
  - Forecheck
  - Neutral zone trap
- Lacrosse strategy
- Tennis strategy
  - Pusher
  - Serve-and-volley
- Fencing tactics
- Mind sports
  - Chess
    - Chess strategy
    - Chess tactic
  - Shogi
    - Shogi strategy
    - Shogi tactics
  - Go strategy and tactics
  - Backgammon match strategy
  - Poker strategy
- Football codes
  - American football strategy
    - One-platoon system
    - Two-platoon system
    - Formation
      - Offensive
        - T formation
        - I formation
        - Single set back
        - Pro set
        - Single-wing formation
        - Wildcat formation
        - Short punt formation
        - Shotgun formation
        - Pistol offense
        - Swinging gate
        - Wishbone formation
        - Flexbone formation
      - Defensive
        - 4–3 defense
        - 3–4 defense
        - 4–4 defense
        - 5–3 defense
        - 6–2 defense
        - 46 defense
        - 5–2 defense
        - 7–2–2 defense
        - 7–1–2–1 defense
        - Nickel defense
        - Dime defense
        - Prevent defense
    - Plays
      - Alley-oop
      - Blitz
      - Bootleg play
      - Checkdown
      - Corn Dog
      - Counter run
      - Dive
      - End run
      - Hail Mary pass
      - Iso
      - Jump shift
      - Minnesota shift
      - Off-tackle run
      - Onside kick
      - Packers sweep
      - Peanut Punch
      - Philly Special
      - Power run
      - Quarterback keeper
      - Quarterback scramble
      - Quarterback sneak
      - Quick kick
      - Route
      - Run-pass option
      - Rush
      - Screen pass
      - Squib kick
      - Student Body Right
      - Sweep
      - Toss play
      - Trap run
      - Triple option
      - Tush Push
      - Zone blitz
      - Zone run
      - Trick play
        - Double pass
        - Draw play
        - End-around
        - Fake field goal
        - Fake procedure
        - Fake punt
        - Fake spike
        - Flea flicker
        - Fumblerooski
        - Halfback option play
        - Hook and ladder
        - Play-action pass
        - Pyramid Play
        - Reverse
        - Spinner play
        - Statue of Liberty play
        - Swinging gate
        - Tackle-eligible play
      - Play calling system
      - Clock management
  - Association football tactics
    - History of tactics in association football
    - Formation
    - Marking
    - Anti-football
    - Total Football
    - Tiki-taka
    - Catenaccio
    - Combination Game
    - Flo pass
    - High press
    - Long ball
    - Push and run
    - Revie Plan
    - Zona mista
  - Australian football tactics and skills
  - Rugby
    - Crash ball
    - Rugby league gameplay
    - Rugby union gameplay

=== Sport techniques and skills ===
Capoeira techniques

- Dribbling
- Passing
  - Football codes
    - Association football
      - Assist
    - Gridiron football
      - Forward pass
        - Hail Mary pass
      - Lateral pass
  - Ice hockey
  - Juggling
- Grind
- Kick (football)
  - Bomb
  - Drop kick
  - Grubber kick
  - Place kick
  - Punt
    - Torpedo punt
    - Australian football
    - Gridiron football
  - Association football
    - Bicycle kick
    - Scorpion kick
- Volley
  - Association football
  - Tennis
- List of association football skills
- Bat and ball sports
  - Pitch (baseball)
    - Fastball
      - Cut fastball
      - Four-seam fastball
      - Sinker
      - Two-seam fastball
      - Gyroball
      - Shuuto
    - Off-speed pitch
      - Breaking ball
        - Curveball
          - 12–6 curveball
          - Knuckle curve
        - Screwball
        - Slider
        - Slurve
      - Changeup
        - Circle changeup
        - Forkball
          - Split-finger fastball
        - Fosh
        - Palmball
        - Vulcan changeup
        - Eephus pitch
      - Knuckleball
  - Bowling (cricket)
    - Fast bowling
      - Seam bowling
      - Swing bowling
    - Spin bowling
      - Finger spin
        - Off spin
        - Left-arm orthodox spin
      - Wrist spin
        - Leg spin
        - Left-arm unorthodox spin
- Climbing technique
- Cue sports techniques
- Ski jumping techniques
- Tennis shot
  - Forehand
  - Backhand
  - Tweener
- Cheerleading
  - List of cheerleading jumps
  - List of cheerleading stunts
- Combat sports
  - Stance
    - Front stance
    - Horse stance
  - Footwork
    - Ginga (capoeira)
    - Tai sabaki
  - Blocking
    - Parry
  - Hard and soft techniques
  - Sweep
  - Hand-to-hand combat
    - Stand-up fighting
      - Clinch fighting
    - Ground fighting
  - Grappling
    - Bridge
    - Hooks
    - Sprawl
    - Transition
    - Grappling position
      - Stand-up
        - Over–under position
        - Bear hug
        - Collar-and-elbow position
        - Collar tie
        - Underhook
        - Pinch grip tie
      - Ground
        - Mount
          - Back mount
        - Crucifix position
        - Knee-on-stomach
        - Side control
        - North–south position
        - Guard
          - Half guard
          - Rubber guard
    - Takedown
      - Throw
        - Ippon seoi nage
    - Grappling hold
      - Pin
        - Cradle
        - Guillotine
      - Joint lock
        - Spinal lock
          - Boston crab
          - Nelson hold
        - Small joint manipulation
          - Wristlock
        - Compression lock
          - Figure-four
        - Armlock
          - Ude hishigi juji gatame
          - Ude hishigi sankaku gatame
        - Leglock
          - Ashi garami
      - Chokehold
        - Arm triangle choke
        - Sode guruma jime
        - Gogoplata
        - Guillotine choke
        - North–south choke
        - Rear naked choke
        - Triangle choke
        - Sode guruma jime
        - Okuri eri jime
  - Striking
    - Headbutt
      - Cabeçada
    - Limbs
      - Arms
        - Open-hand strikes
          - Slapping
          - Knifehand strike
        - Punch
          - Cross
          - Hook
          - Russian hook
          - Shovel hook
          - Jab
          - Leopard Blow
          - Bolo punch
          - Oi-zuki
          - One-inch punch
          - Overhand punch
          - Gyaku-zuki
          - Sucker punch
          - Superman punch
          - Uppercut
          - Rabbit punch
        - Elbow strike
          - 12–6 elbow
      - Legs
        - Kick
          - Armada
          - Meia lua de frente
          - Queixada
          - Roundhouse kick
            - Low kick
            - Martelo
            - Mawashi geri
          - Cartwheel kick
            - Aú
          - Flying kick
            - 360 Crescent kick
            - 540 kick
            - Butterfly kick
            - Dropkick
          - Front kick
            - Bênção
            - Soccer kick
          - Back kick
            - Chapa de costas
            - Ushiro-Geri
          - Scissor kick
          - Rabo de arraia
            - Meia lua de compasso
            - Scorpion kick (capoeira)
          - Stomp
        - Knee strike
  - Boxing styles and technique
  - Karate techniques
    - List of shotokan techniques
  - List of Brazilian jiu-jitsu techniques
  - List of capoeira techniques
  - List of judo techniques
  - List of taekwondo techniques
  - Professional wrestling aerial techniques

== Performance ==
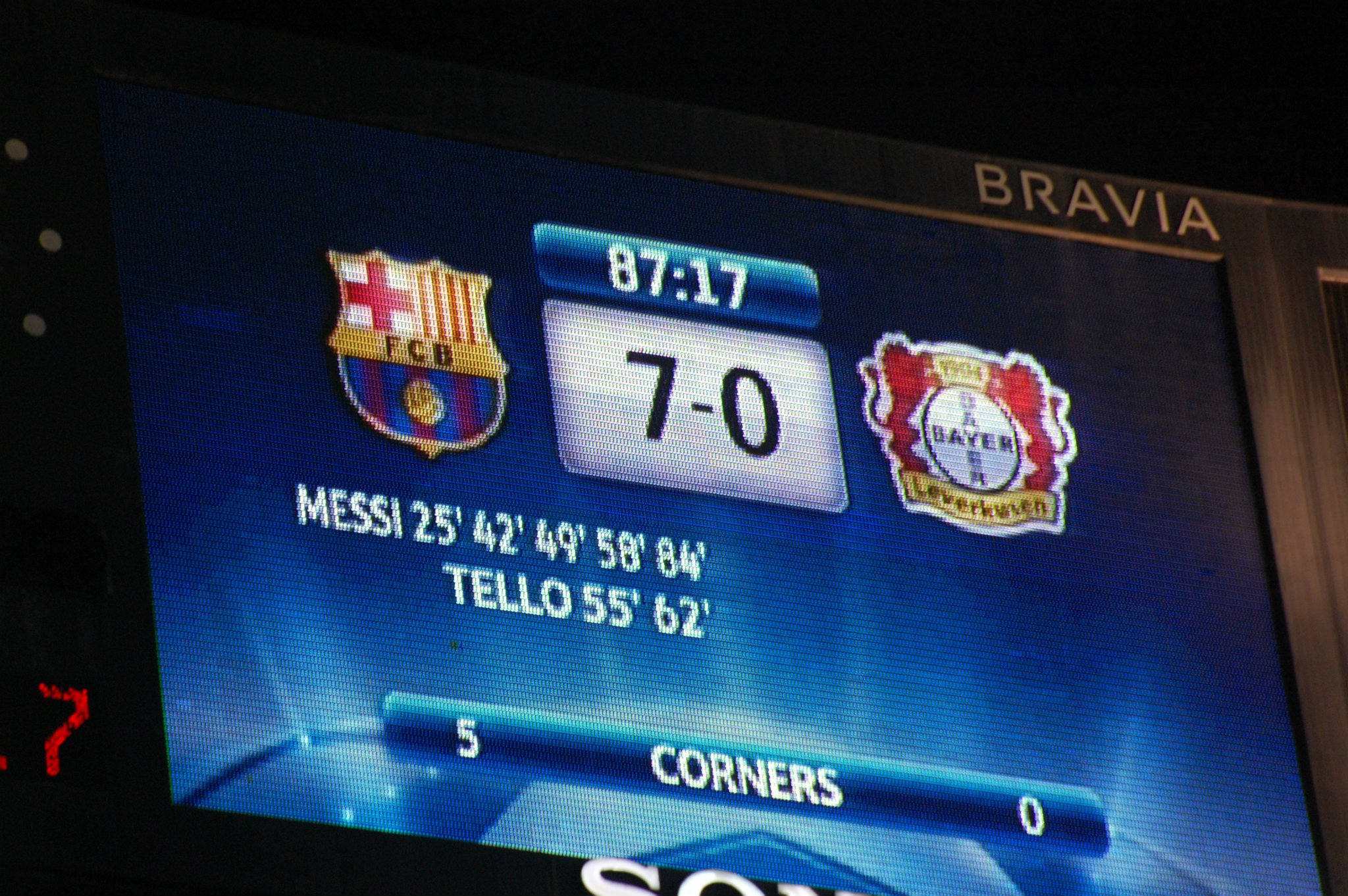
Shutout in soccer

- Beginner's luck
- Comeback
- Power play
- Losing streak
- Winning streak
- Blowout
- Garbage time
- Podium sweep
- Choke
- Clutch
- Dead rubber
- Upset
- Mercy rule
- Slump
- Most valuable player
- Player of the match
- Best and fairest
- Minor premiership
- Hat-trick
- Three-peat
- Wire-to-wire
- Nap hand
- Sports dynasty
- Perfect score
  - Perfect 10 (gymnastics)
  - Perfect game (baseball)
  - Perfect game (bowling)
  - Perfect season
  - Shutout
  - Whitewash
- Highest scoring matches
  - List of highest-scoring NFL games
  - List of highest-scoring NBA games
  - Association football
    - AS Adema 149–0 SO l'Emyrne
    - List of highest-scoring A-League Men matches
    - List of highest-scoring Eliteserien matches
    - List of highest-scoring Iraq Stars League matches
    - List of highest-scoring matches in Georgian top football league
    - List of highest-scoring Premier League matches
- List of major achievements in sports by nation
  - Major achievements in baseball and softball by nation
  - Major achievements in basketball by nation
  - Major achievements in curling by nation
  - Major achievements in cycling by nation
  - Football codes
    - Major achievements in association football by nation
    - Major achievements in rugby by nation
  - Major achievements in gymnastics by nation
  - Major achievements in handball by nation
  - Hockey
    - Major achievements in field hockey by nation
    - Major achievements in ice hockey by nation
    - Major achievements in roller hockey by nation
  - Major achievements in judo by nation
  - Major achievements in luge by nation
  - Major achievements in swimming by nation
  - Major achievements in table tennis by nation
  - Major achievements in volleyball by nation
  - Major achievements in water polo by nation

=== Analytics ===
- No decision
- Baseball statistics
  - Sabermetrics
- Advanced statistics in basketball
- Analytics in ice hockey
  - Corsi
- Expected goals
- Possession value
- Sinclair coefficient
- Wilks coefficient
- Win probability
  - Win probability added

=== Rating system ===
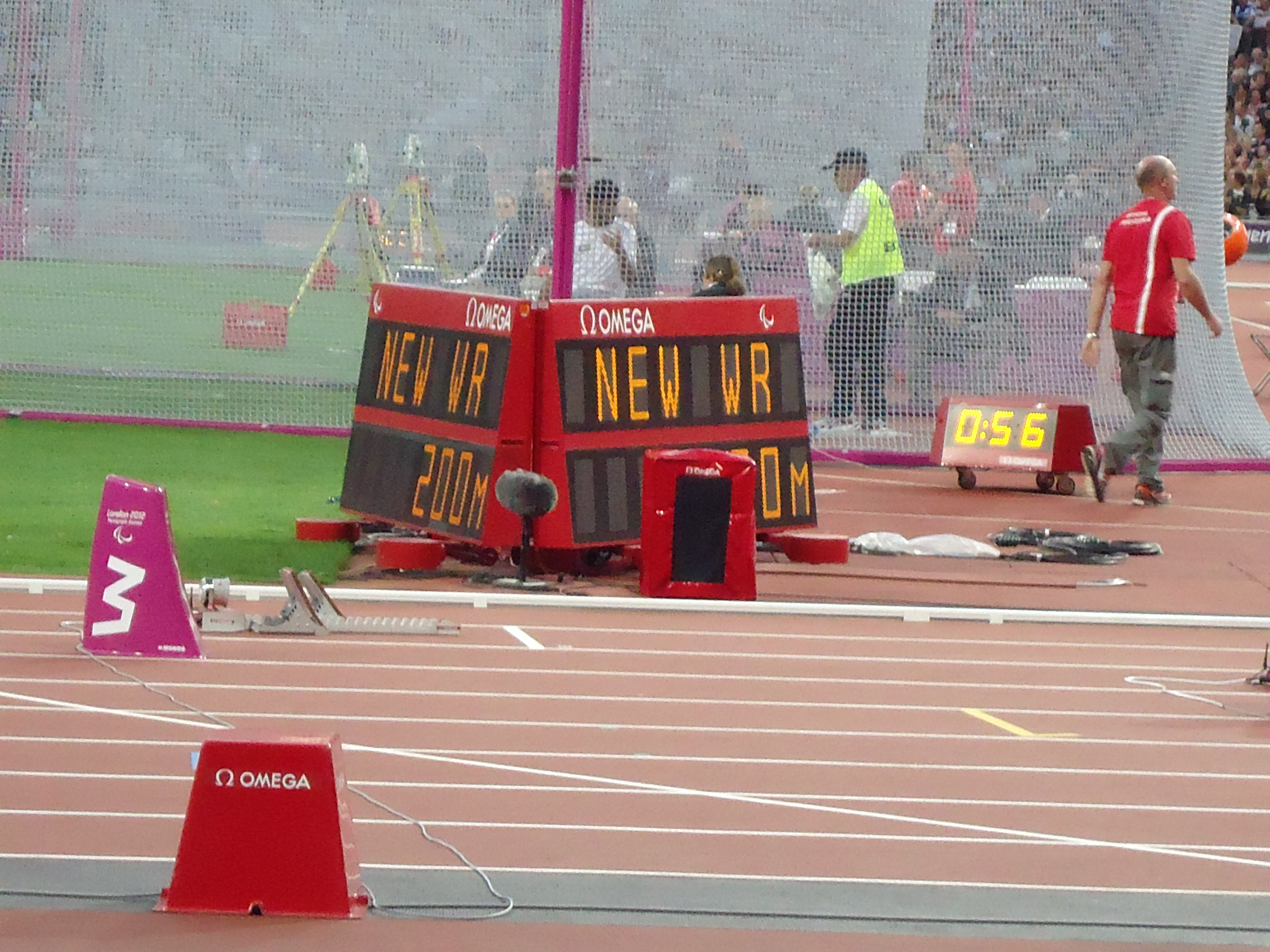
Setting a world record at Paralympics games

- Standings
  - Group tournament ranking system
  - Olympic medal table
  - Placing table
  - Elo rating system
  - Rating percentage index
  - Winning percentage
  - Pound for pound
    - Boxing pound for pound rankings
  - Three points for a win
  - Personal record
  - World record
    - List of world records in archery
    - List of world records in athletics
      - List of world under-18 bests in athletics
      - List of world under-20 records in athletics
      - List of world records in masters athletics
      - List of IPC world records in athletics
    - List of world best times in canoeing
    - List of world records in chess
    - Cricket
      - List of One Day International cricket records
      - World's longest cricket marathon
    - List of cycling records
      - List of world records in track cycling
    - List of world records in finswimming
    - Juggling world records
    - List of world records in life saving
    - List of world best times in rowing
    - List of world records in speed skating
    - List of longest ski jumps
    - List of world records in speedcubing
    - Sport stacking world records
    - List of world records in swimming
      - List of IPC world records in swimming
      - List of textile best times in swimming
    - List of world records in Olympic weightlifting
      - List of youth world records in Olympic weightlifting
      - List of junior world records in Olympic weightlifting
    - World altitude record (mountaineering)
    - Record progression
      - Progression of association football goalscoring record
      - Index of sport of athletics record progressions
      - Weightlifting
      - Baseball
        - List of Major League Baseball progressive career hits leaders
        - List of Major League Baseball progressive career home runs leaders
        - List of Major League Baseball progressive single-season home run leaders
        - Progression of the bench press world record
        - Progression of the deadlift world record
        - World record progression men's weightlifting
          - World record progression men's weightlifting (1993–1997)
          - World record progression men's weightlifting (1998–2018)
          - World record progression men's weightlifting (2018–2025)
        - World record progression women's weightlifting
          - World record progression women's weightlifting (1998–2018)
          - World record progression women's weightlifting (2018–2025)
- Box score
  - Baseball
- Magic number
- Games behind
- Elimination from postseason contention
- Rankings
  - World Archery Rankings
  - World Athletics Rankings
  - Bat and ball sports
    - WBSC World Rankings
    - Cricket
      - ICC Men's ODI Team Rankings
      - ICC Men's T20I Team Rankings
      - ICC Men's Test Team Rankings
      - ICC Women's ODI and T20I Team Rankings
  - Basketball
    - FIBA Men's World Ranking
    - FIBA Women's World Ranking
  - Combat sports
    - Boxing
      - List of current boxing rankings
      - List of current women's boxing rankings
    - Mixed Martial Arts
      - ONE Championship Rankings
      - PFL Rankings
      - UFC rankings
  - WCF World Rankings
  - Cycling
    - UCI men's road racing world ranking
    - UCI women's road world rankings
  - Darts World Rankings
    - PDC World Rankings
  - Dodgeball ranking
  - Figure skating
    - ISU World Standings
    - ISU Season's World Ranking
  - Football codes
    - Soccer
      - BSWW World Ranking
      - FIFA Men's World Ranking
        - FIFA World Ranking system (1999–2006)
        - FIFA World Ranking system (2006–2018)
      - FIFA Women's World Ranking
      - World Football Elo Ratings
    - Rugby
      - League
        - IRL Men's World Rankings
        - IRL Wheelchair World Rankings
        - IRL Women's World Rankings
      - Union
        - World Rugby Rankings
        - World Rugby Women's World Rankings
  - Golf
    - Official World Golf Ranking
    - Women's World Golf Rankings
    - World Amateur Golf Ranking
  - Hockey
    - FIH Men's World Ranking
    - FIH Women's World Ranking
    - IFF World Ranking
    - IIHF World Ranking
    - Roller hockey rankings
  - IKF World Korfball Ranking
  - Mind sports
    - FIDE rankings
    - RIF rating list
  - World Netball Rankings
  - Racket sports
    - Badminton
      - BWF World Ranking
      - BWF World Junior Ranking
    - Squash
      - Men's Squash World Rankings
      - Women's Squash World Rankings
    - Current tennis rankings
      - ITF rankings
      - ATP rankings
      - WTA rankings
    - ITTF World Ranking
  - TCR World Ranking
  - Volleyball
    - FIVB Beach Volleyball World Rankings
    - FIVB Senior Continental Rankings
    - FIVB Senior World Rankings
      - FIVB Senior World Ranking system (until 2020)
    - FIVB Youth and Junior World Rankings
  - FINA Water Polo World Rankings

=== Awards ===
- Baseball awards
  - List of college baseball awards
- List of golf awards
- List of sports journalism awards
- List of Premier Lacrosse League awards
- List of Professional Bowlers Association awards
- List of professional wrestling awards
- List of sports awards honoring women
- Rugby union trophies and awards

==== Trophies ====
Olympic trophies

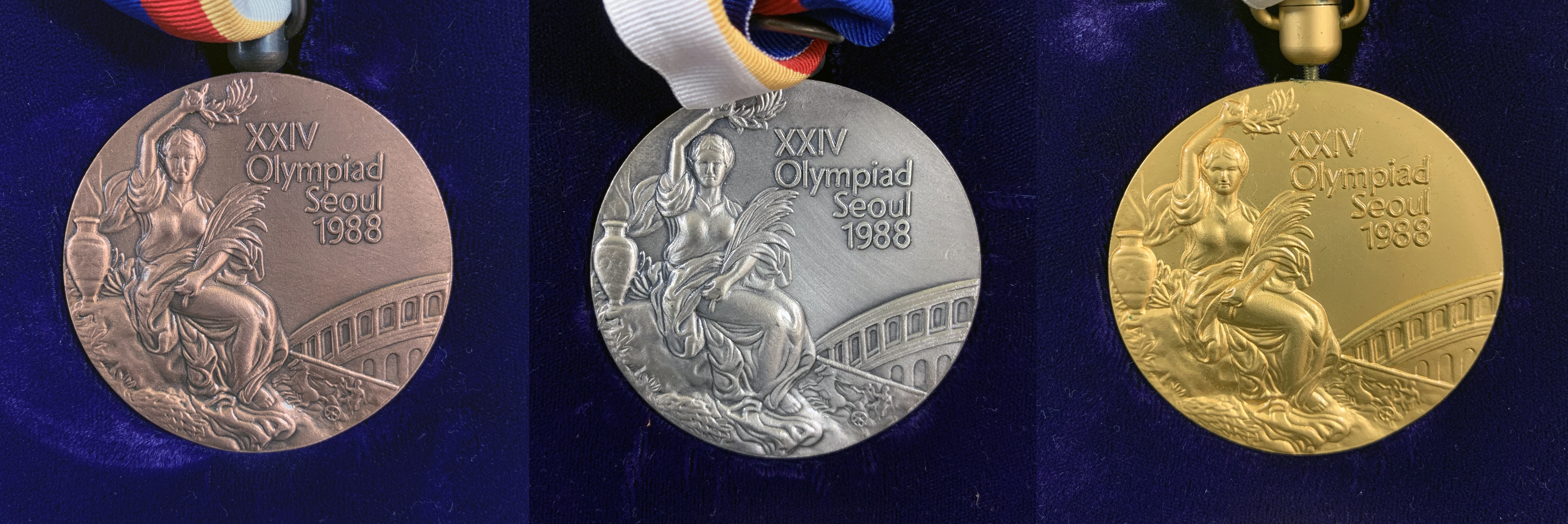
Medals

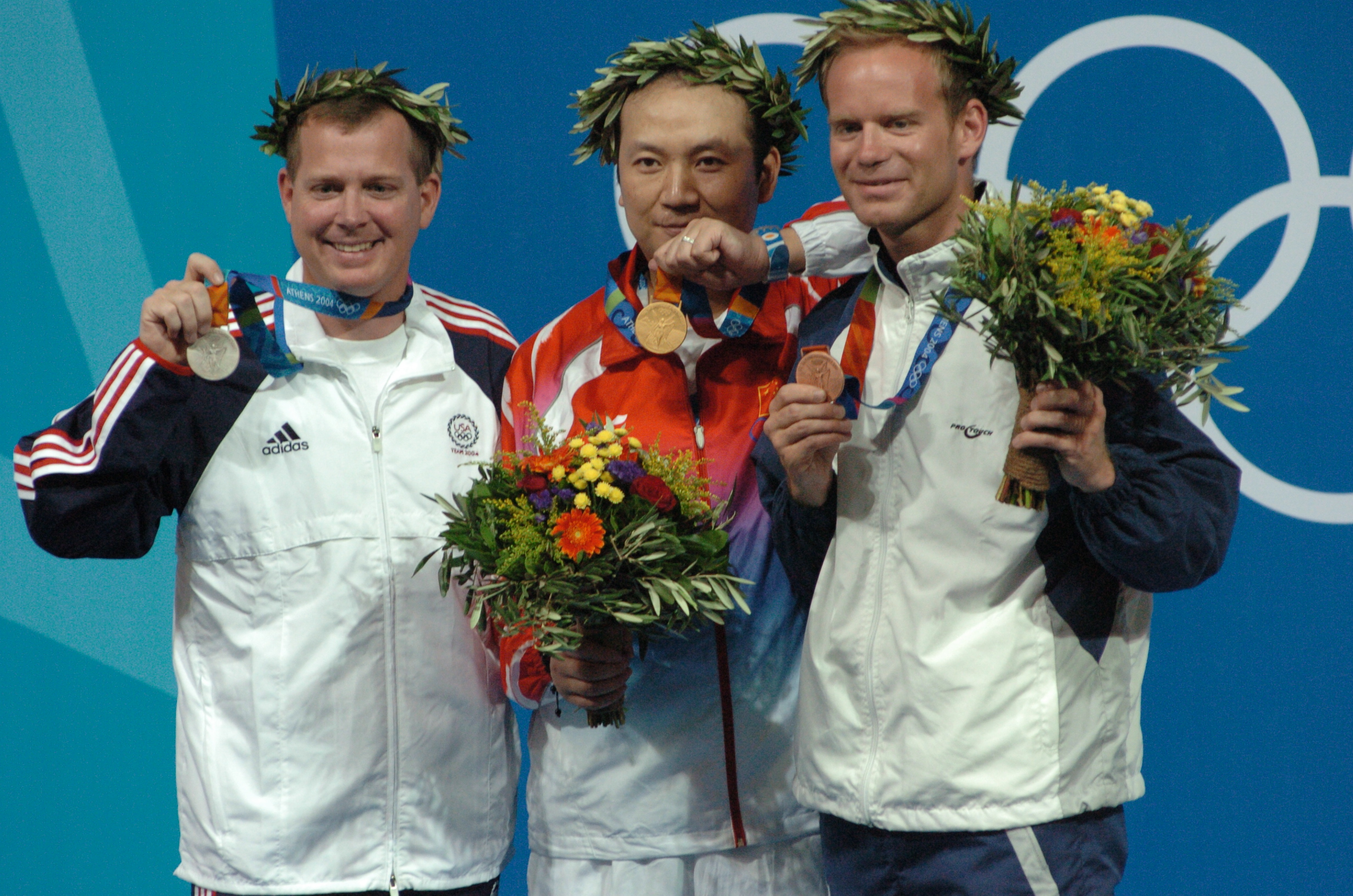
Olive crown as an award at the 2004 Summer Olympics

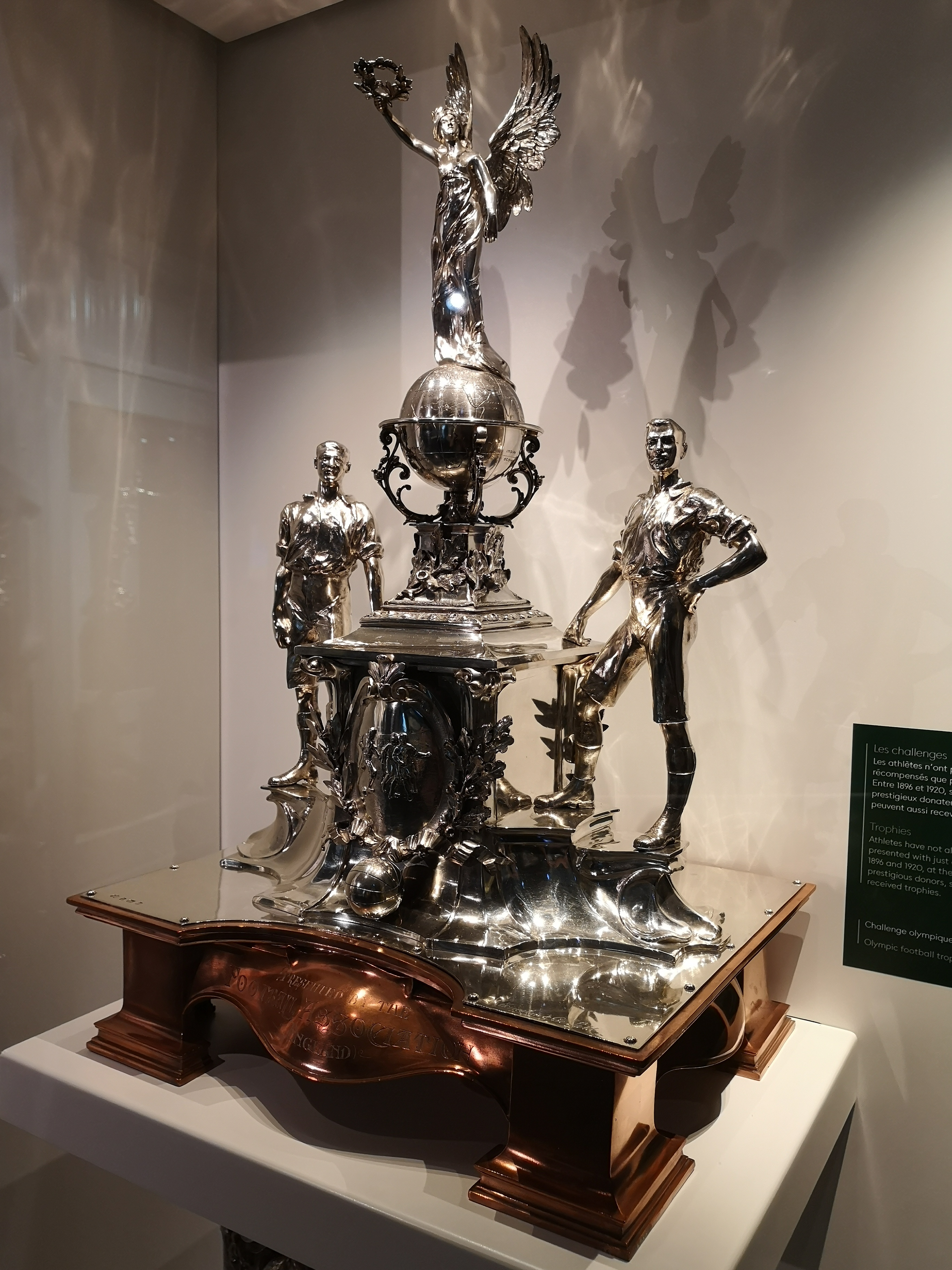
Olympic Challenge football trophy offered by The Football Association to the winner of 1920 Summer Olympics football tournament

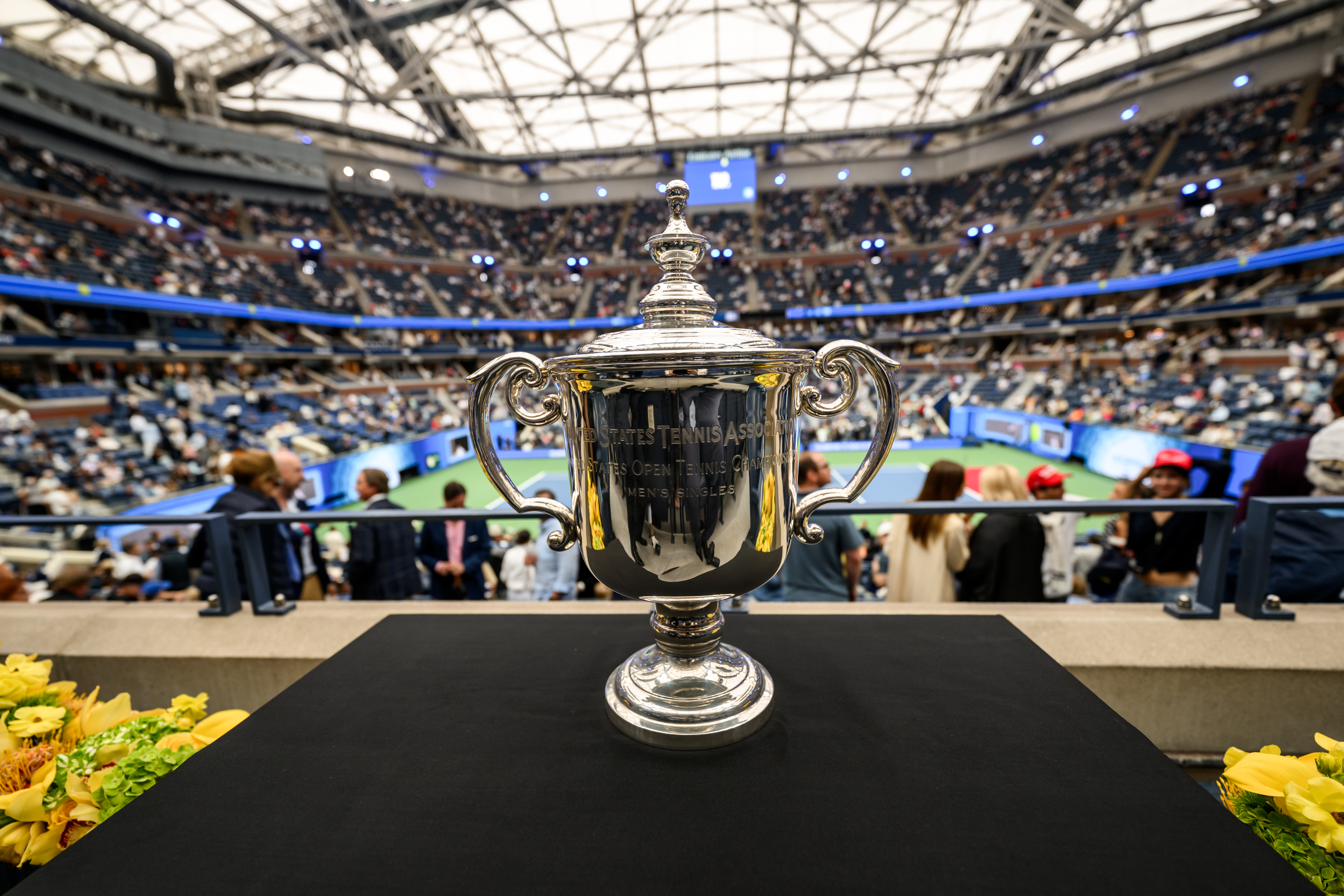
US Open Men Singles trophy

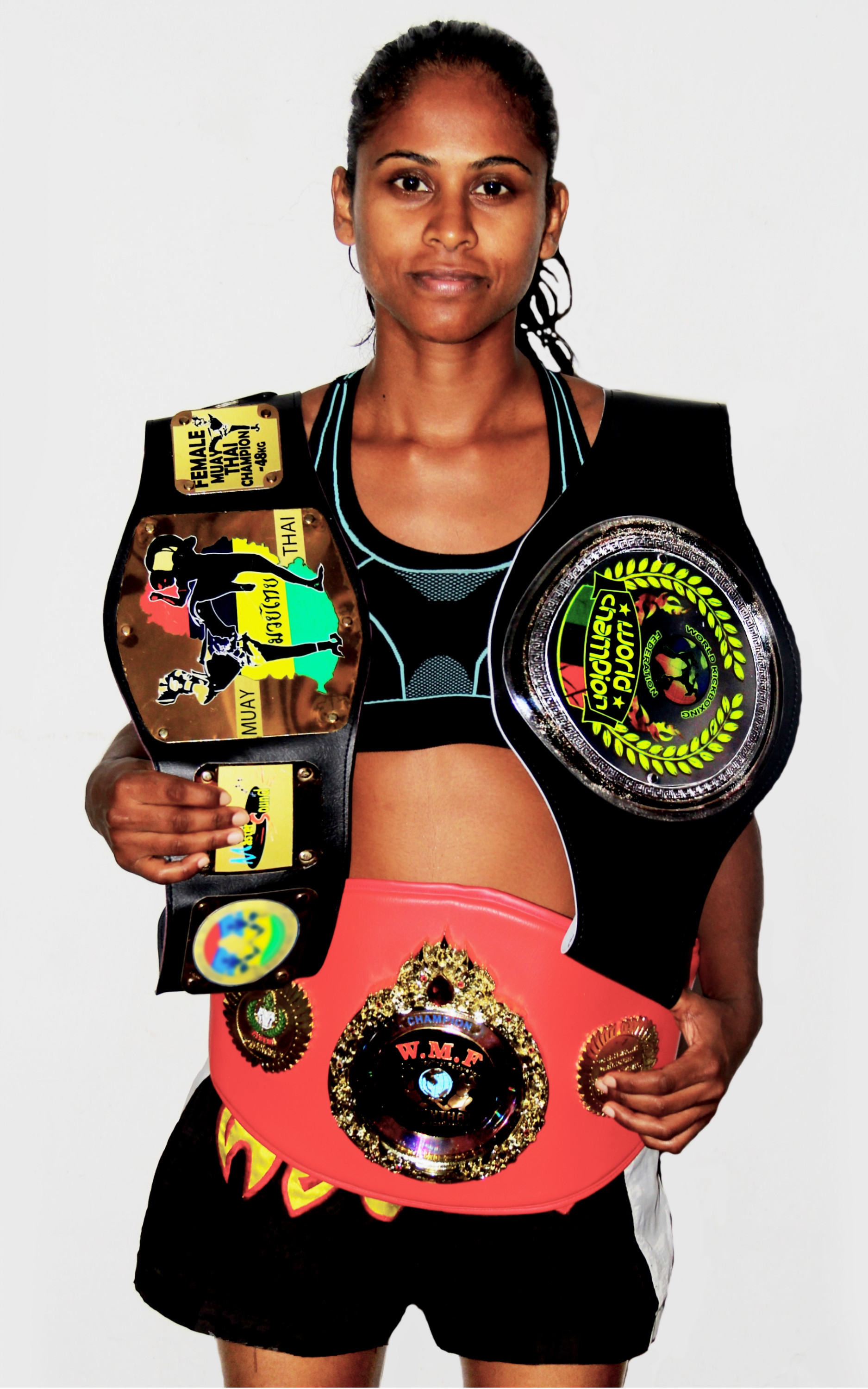
A fighter with championship belts

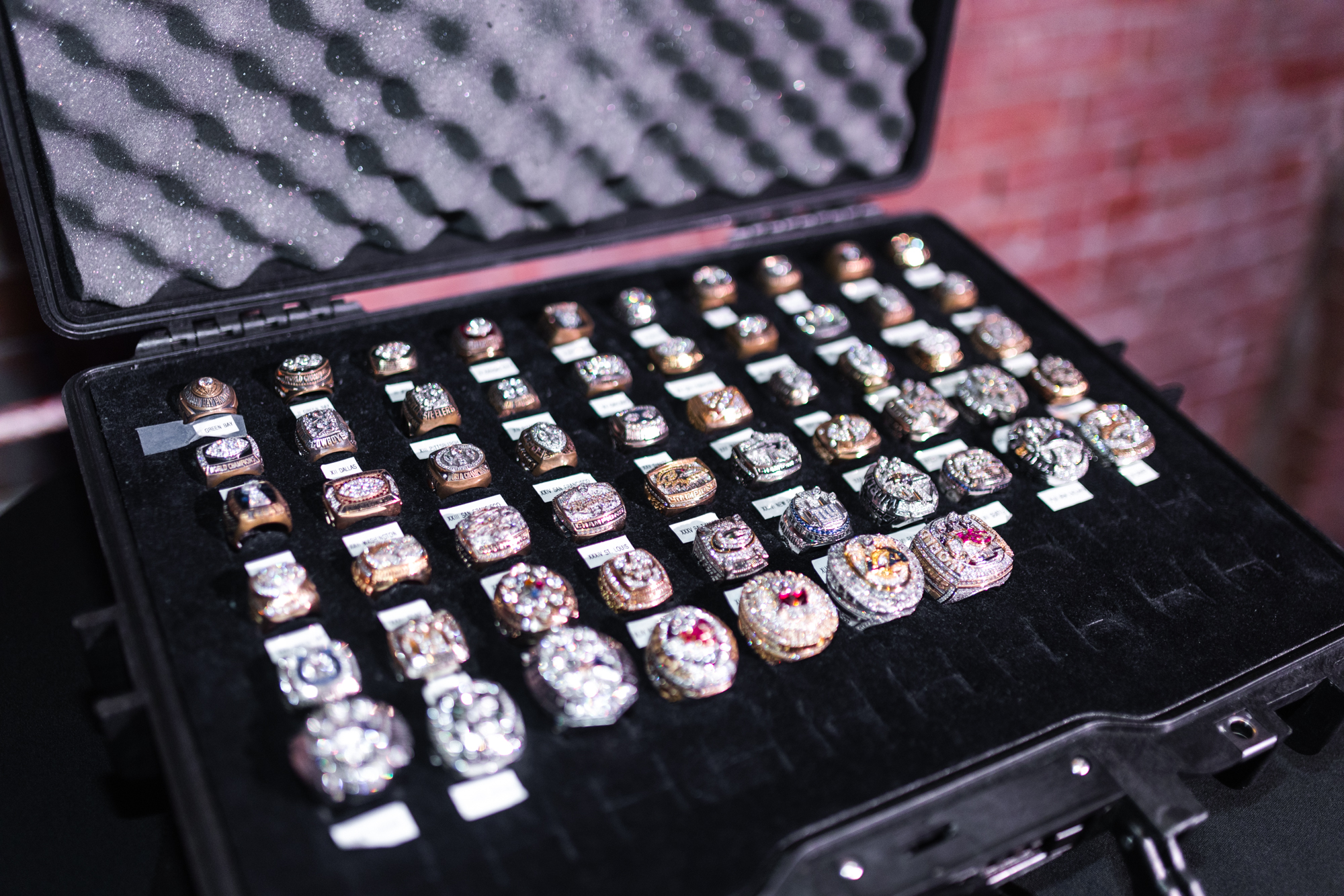
A collection of Superbowl championship rings

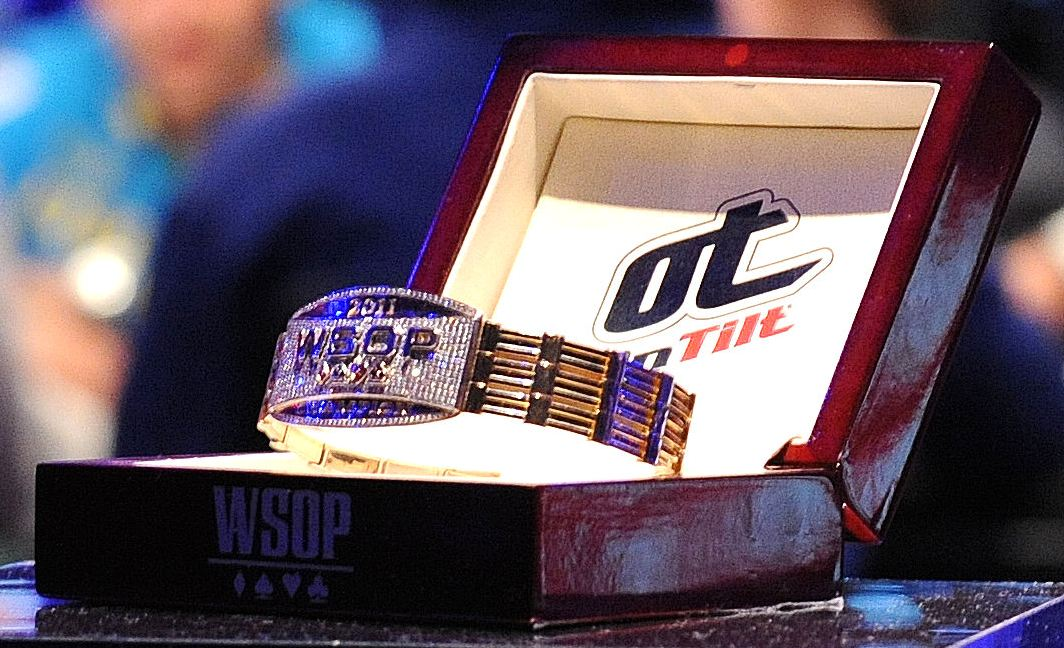
World Series of Pocket Bracelet

- Loving cup
- Championship belt
- Championship ring
  - AEW Dynamite Diamond Ring
  - MLS Cup ring
  - NBA championship ring
  - Stanley Cup ring
  - Super Bowl ring
  - World Series ring
- Medal
  - Olympic medal
- Olive wreath
- Wooden spoon
- By sport
  - Bat and ball sports
    - Baseball
      - World Baseball Classic Championship Trophy
      - Commissioner's Trophy
    - Cricket
      - Cricket World Cup Trophy
      - The Ashes urn
      - Border–Gavaskar Trophy
  - Basketball
    - Naismith Trophy
    - Larry O'Brien Championship Trophy
    - Jun Bernardino Trophy
  - Football codes
    - Soccer
      - FIFA World Cup Trophy
      - European Champion Clubs' Cup
      - Copa Libertadores
      - Philip F. Anschutz Trophy
    - McClelland Trophy (Australian football)
    - Sam Maguire Cup (Gaelic football)
    - Gridiron football
      - American football
        - The Coaches' Trophy
        - College Football Playoff National Championship Trophy
        - Heisman Trophy
        - Vince Lombardi Trophy
        - Foster Trophy
      - Canadian football
        - Grey Cup
        - Vanier Cup
    - Rugby
      - Paul Barrière Trophy (League)
      - Union
        - Calcutta Cup
        - Webb Ellis Cup
  - Claret Jug (golf)
  - Horse racing
    - Arlington Million Trophy
    - August Belmont Trophy
    - Kentucky Derby Trophy
    - Kentucky Oaks Trophy
    - Man o' War Cup
    - Triple Crown Trophy
    - Woodlawn Vase
  - Liam MacCarthy Cup (hurling)
  - Ice hockey
    - Aurora Borealis Cup
    - Clarkson Cup
    - Gagarin Cup
    - Kanada-malja
    - Le Mat Trophy
    - O'Brien Trophy
    - Stanley Cup
    - Walter Cup
  - Lacrosse
    - National Lacrosse League Cup
    - Mann Cup
    - Steinfeld Trophy
  - Motorsports
    - British Grand Prix Trophy
    - Borg-Warner Trophy
    - Harley J. Earl Trophy
    - Sprint Cup
  - World Series of Poker bracelet
  - Tennis
    - Venus Rosewater Dish
    - Coupe des Mousquetaires
  - Jules Verne Trophy

=== Halls of fame ===
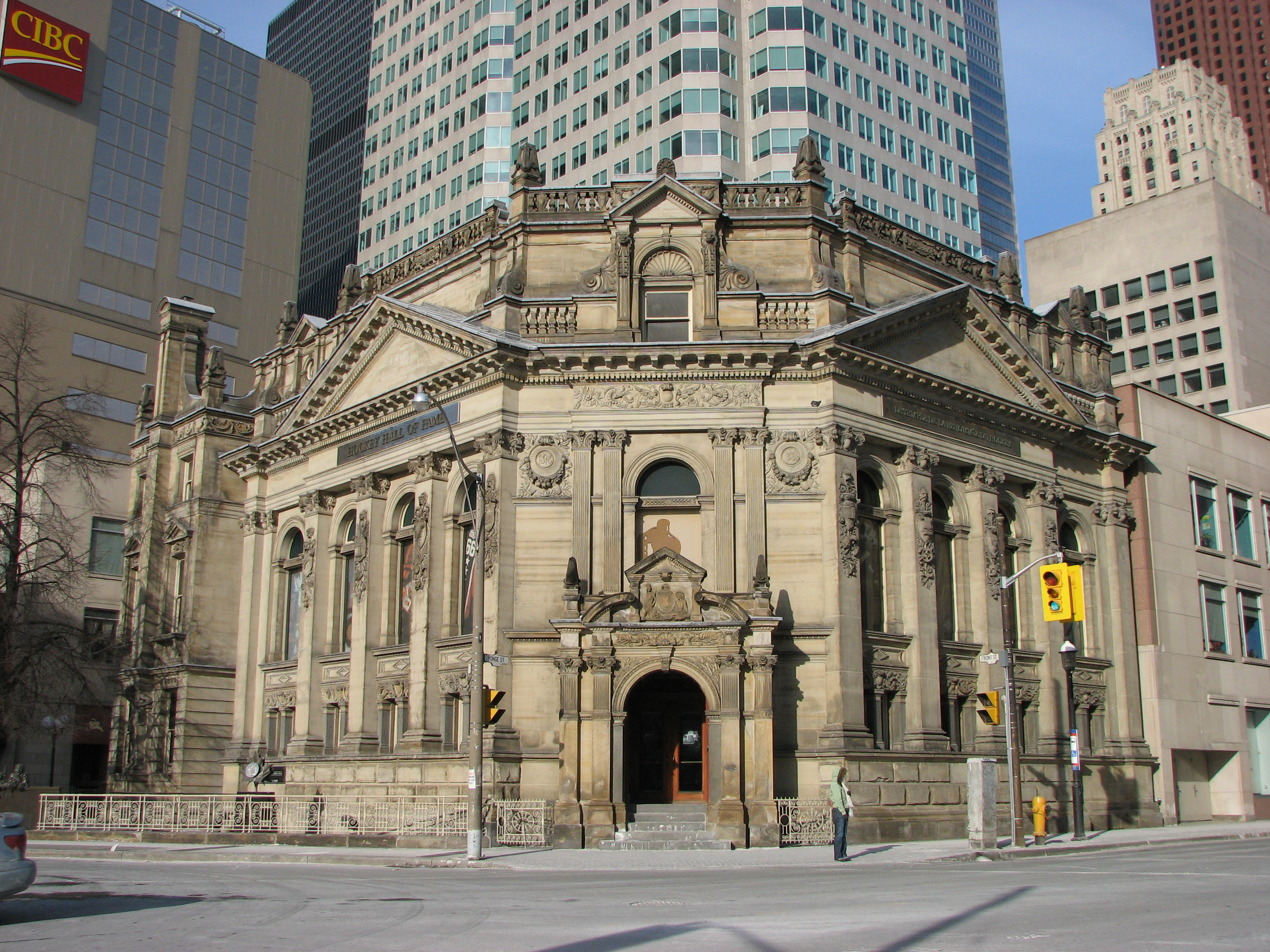
International Ice Hockey Federation Hall of Fame

- Paralympic Hall of Fame
- IAAF Hall of Fame
- FIBA Hall of Fame
- International Bowling Hall of Fame
- Combat sports
  - International Boxing Hall of Fame
  - UFC Hall of Fame
- ICC Cricket Hall of Fame
- UCI Hall of Fame
- Football codes
  - Soccer
    - English Football Hall of Fame
    - Premier League Hall of Fame
  - Rugby
    - Rugby Football League Hall of Fame
    - World Rugby Hall of Fame
- IIHF Hall of Fame
- Mind sports
  - Poker Hall of Fame
  - World Chess Hall of Fame
- Motor sports
  - FIA Hall of Fame
  - MotoGP Legends
- Racket sports
  - Badminton Hall of Fame
  - International Tennis Hall of Fame
  - ITTF Hall of Fame
  - Pickleball Hall of Fame
- International Swimming Hall of Fame
- International Volleyball Hall of Fame

== Sport instruction ==
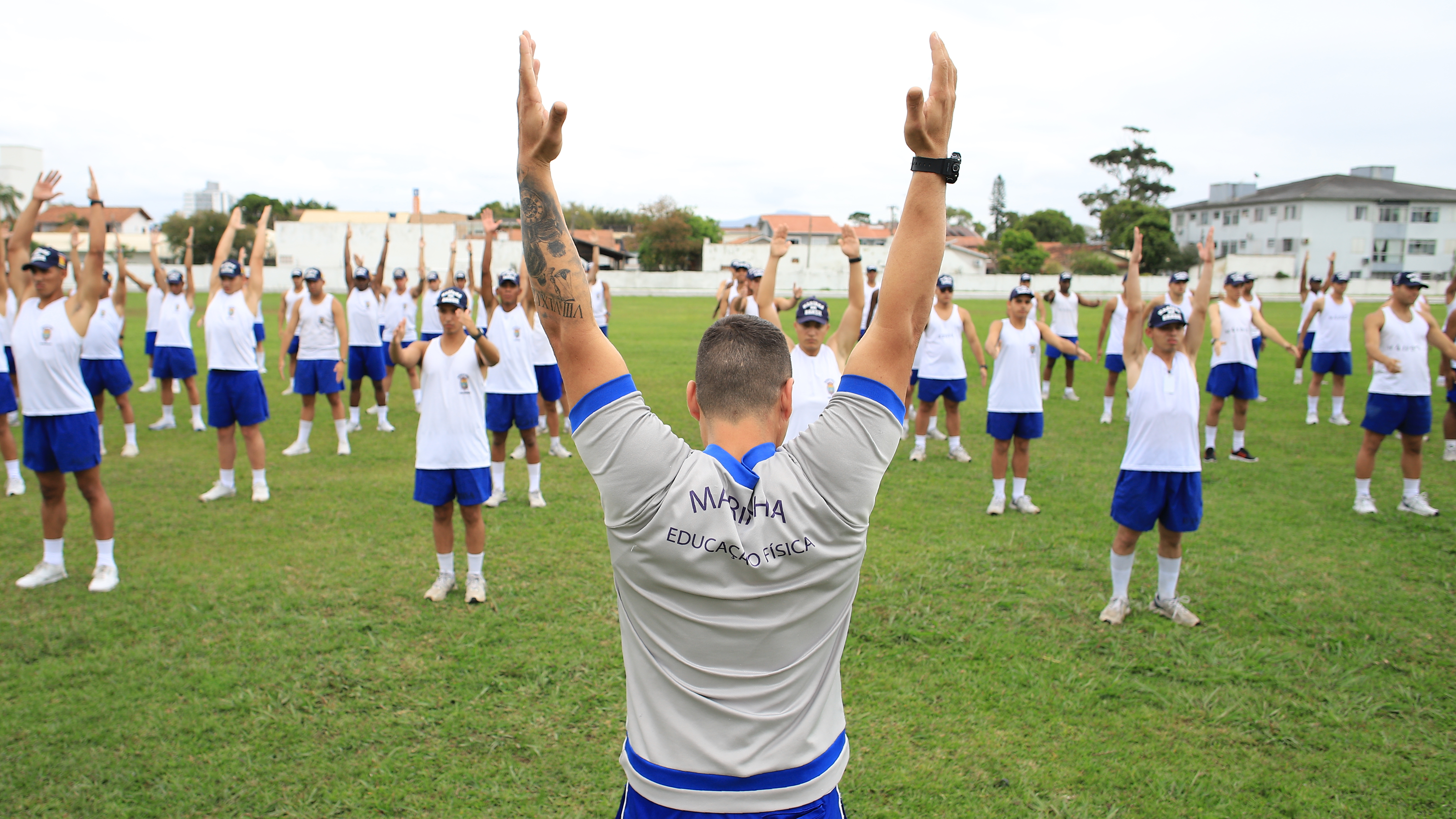
A class of physical education

- Physical education
- Physical culture
- Sports periodization
- Sports school
- Youth system
  - Cantera
- Golf instruction
- Yoga teacher training
- UEFA coaching licences
- AFC Professional Coaching Diploma
- Combat sports
  - Kihon
  - Form
    - Aka
    - Hyeong
      - Teul
    - Kata
      - Bunkai
      - Karate kata
  - Pushing hands
  - Aliveness
    - Randori
  - Sparring
    - Kumite
    - Roda

== Sporting events ==
Multi-sport events

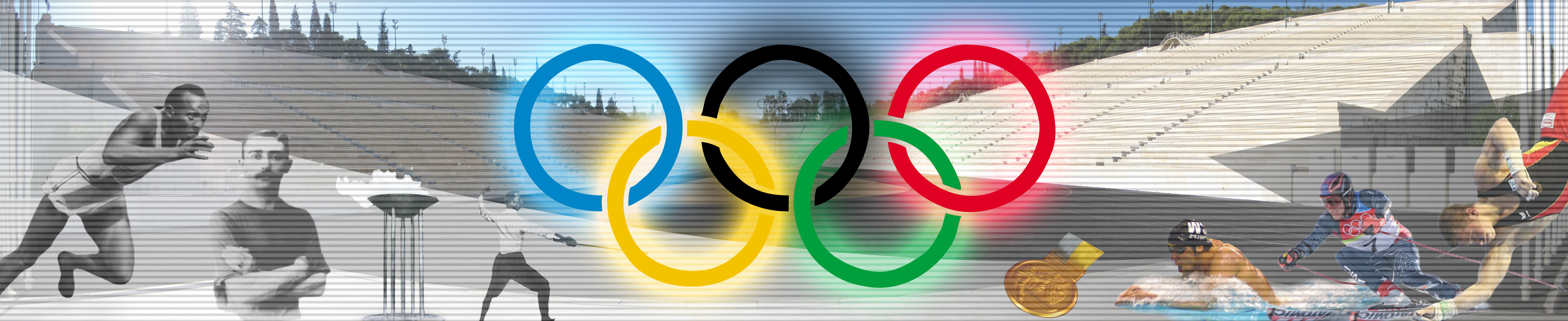
Olympic Games

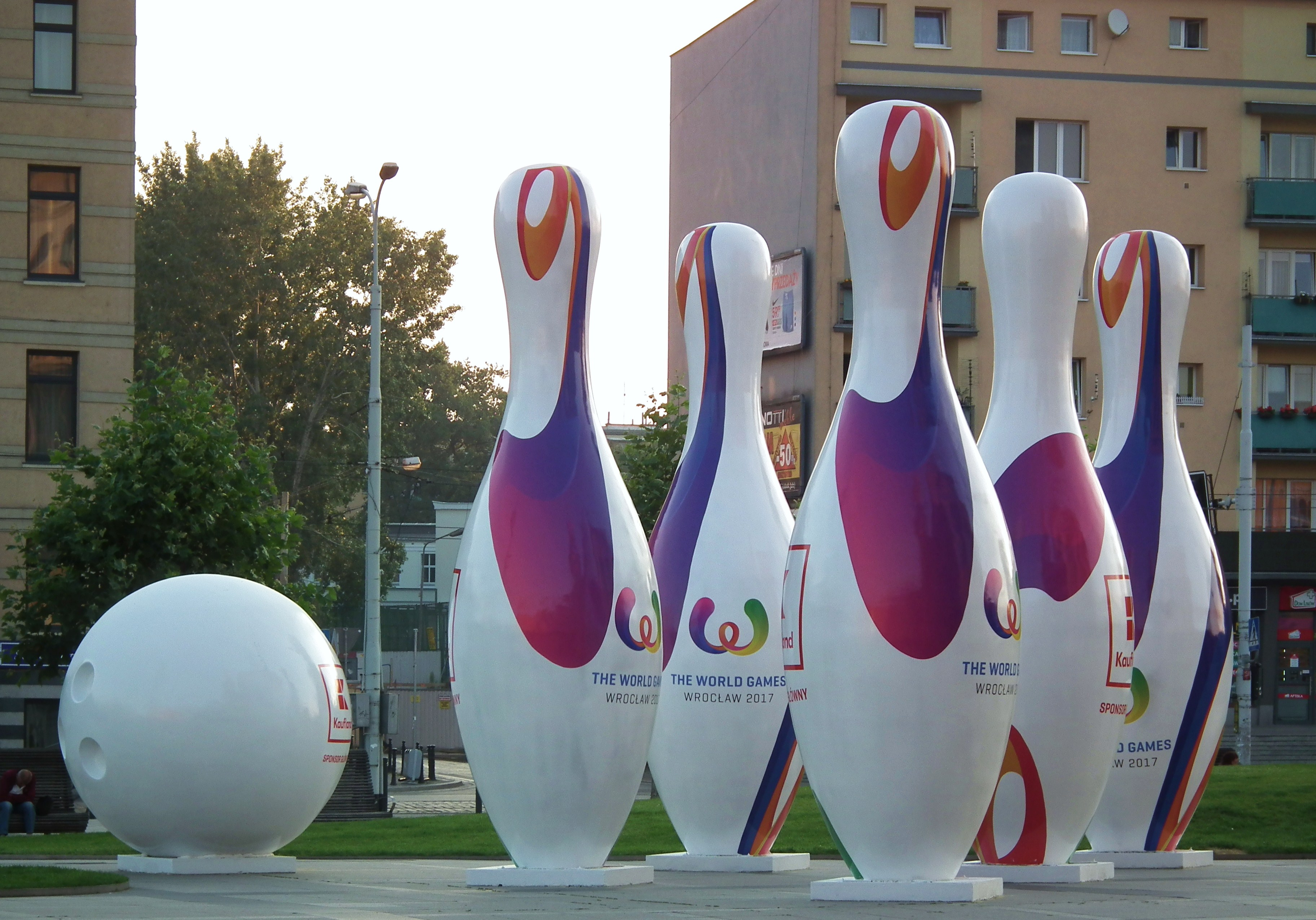
The World Games (organized by the International World Games Association) is one of the most important multi-sport event for non-olympic sports

Round-robin tournament

- Exhibition game
  - All-star game
  - Spring training
  - Barnstorming
  - Clash of Codes
  - Exhibition fight
  - Testimonial match
- Sports entertainment
- Pick-up game
- Behind closed doors
- Night game
- Sunday sporting events
  - Sunday football in Northern Ireland
- International sport
  - Sporting nationality
    - Grandfather rule
      - Grannygate
    - FIBA eligibility rules
    - FIFA eligibility rules
    - IRL eligibility rules
- List of sports attendance figures
  - List of attendance figures at domestic professional sports leagues
- Tournament
  - Multi-sport event
    - Ancient Olympic Games
    - Olympic games
      - Youth Olympic Games
    - World Games
    - List of multi-sport events
  - Ladder tournament
  - Open
  - Championship
    - Champion
    - Lineal championship
      - Challenge
    - National championship
    - World championship
      - List of world sports championships
      - World cup
        - List of world cups
    - Super cup
    - Final
      - Grand final
  - Forfeit (sport)
    - Baseball
  - Walkover
  - Hungarian system
  - Lucky loser
  - Bye
  - Wild card
  - Parity
    - Balance of performance
    - Freak show fight
    - Strength of schedule
  - Repechage
  - Seeding
  - Season
    - Split season
    - Domestic association football season
      - Apertura and Clausura
    - Winter league baseball
  - Play-in game
  - Playoffs
    - Bracket
    - Playoff format
      - Single-elimination tournament
      - Double-elimination tournament
      - McIntyre system
      - Page playoff system
      - Shaughnessy playoff system
      - Two-legged tie
      - Round-robin tournament
        - Swiss-system tournament
  - Tiebreaker
    - One-game playoff
    - Replay
    - Overtime
      - Ice hockey
      - Extra innings
    - Tie-breaking in Swiss-system tournaments
    - Away goals rule
    - Sudden death
      - Golden goal
      - Golden point
    - Shootout
      - Association football
      - Field hockey
      - Bowl-out
    - Cricket
      - Super Over
      - Net run rate
  - Sports league
    - League system
      - Promotion and relegation
      - Closed league
        - Minor league
          - List of developmental and minor sports leagues
        - List of association football leagues without promotion and relegation
      - Semi-closed league
    - Athletic conference
    - Division
    - Realignment in sports
    - Small market

== Sport management and business ==
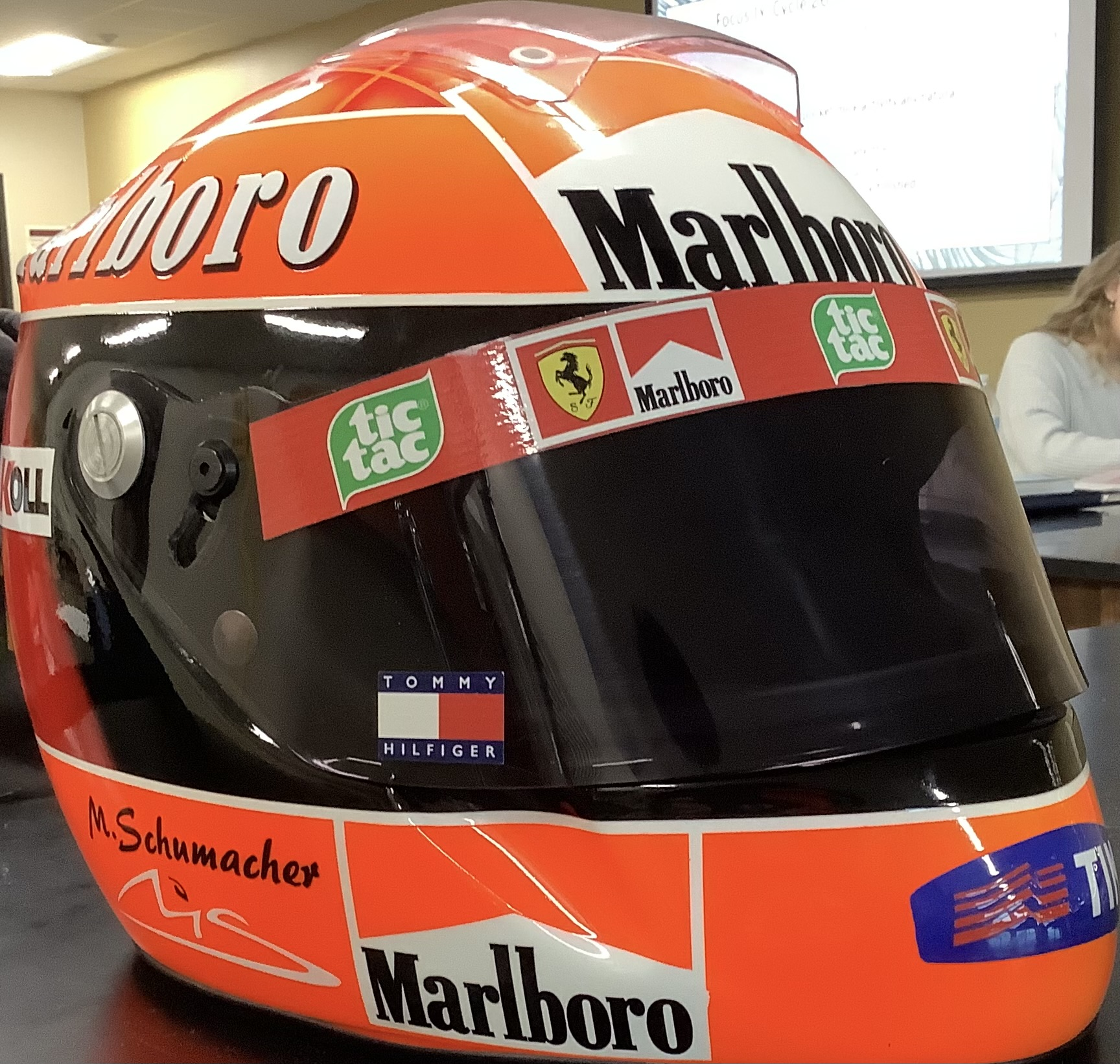
Sponsorship on F1 helmet

- Sport team
  - Farm team
  - Scratch team
    - Team Europe
    - Rest of the world in sports and games
      - Team World
        - World XI
  - Traveling team
  - Varsity team
  - Works team
    - Factory-backed
  - Revival
  - Football team
  - Name
  - Number
    - Retired number
    - Competition number
    - Major League Baseball
    - Association football
    - Gridiron football
      - NFL uniform numbers
    - Rugby union numbering schemes
    - List of Formula One driver numbers
- Sports club
  - Phoenix club
  - Football club
    - East Germany
- Personal seat license
- Sports ticket derivative
- Turf management
  - Greenskeeper
- High-performance sport
- Intramural sports
- Public limited company
  - Sociedad Anónima Deportiva
  - Sociedade Anónima Desportiva
  - Sociedade Anônima do Futebol
- Sport industry
- Sports economics
- Sport betting
  - Bookmaker
  - Off-track betting
- Sports marketing
  - Sponsor
    - Naming rights
    - English football sponsorship
    - Formula One sponsorship liveries
    - List of NBA jersey sponsors

=== Retribution in sport ===
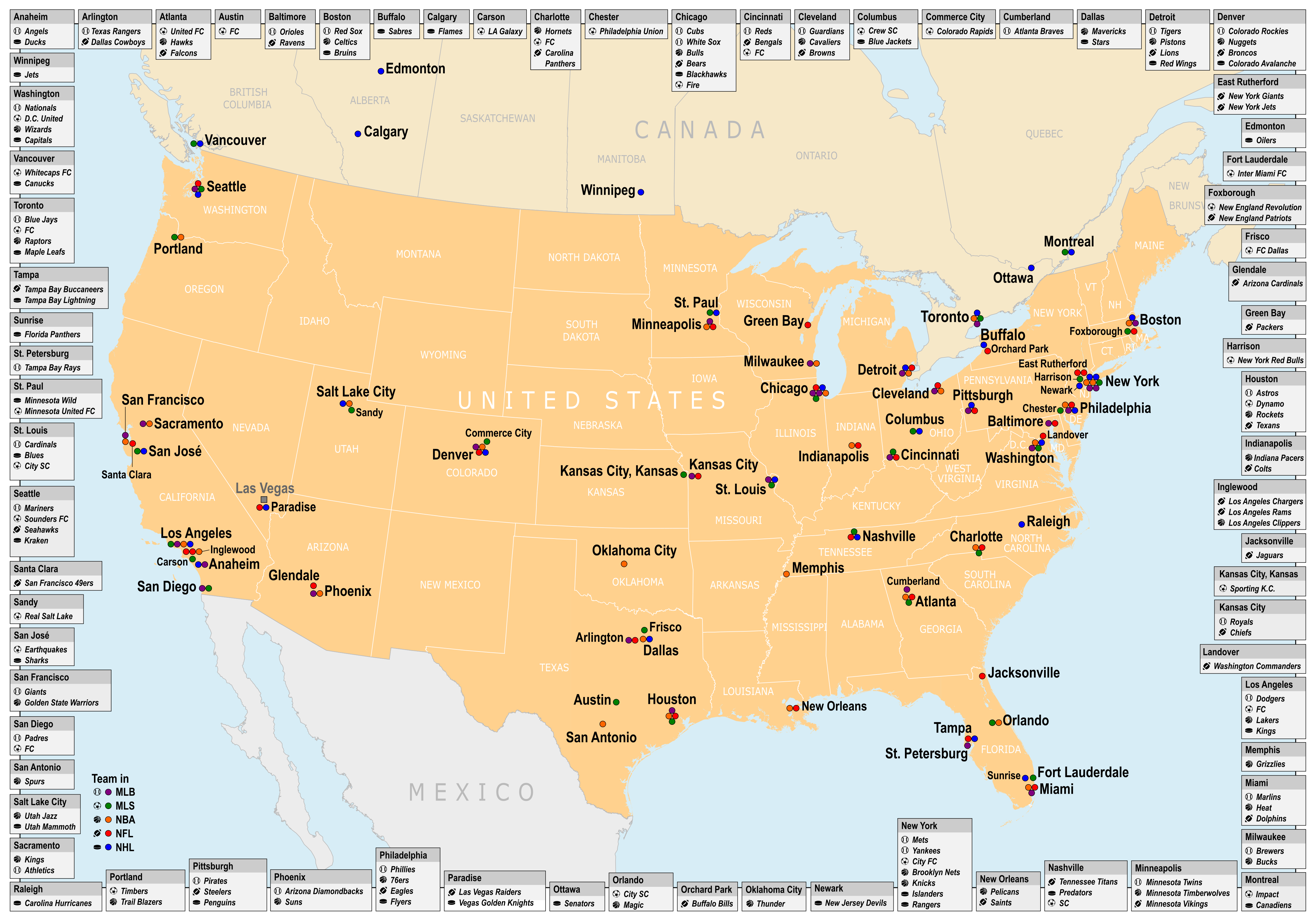
Map showing where major professional sports teams are in the US and Canada

- Professional and amateur status in first-class cricket
- Amateur sports
  - High school American football
  - High school fencing
  - Scholastic wrestling
  - University and college sport
    - College baseball
    - College basketball
    - College american football
      - College flag football
    - College ice hockey
    - College lacrosse
    - College soccer
    - Collegiate wrestling
    - Collegiate fencing
    - Student rugby union
    - Varsity Netball
- Professional sports
  - List of professional sports
    - Professionalism in association football
    - Professional baseball
    - Professional gridiron football
    - Professional ice hockey
    - List of professional sport leagues
      - List of professional sports leagues by revenue
    - Expansion team
    - Relocation of professional sports teams
    - Draft
      - Australian Football League draft
      - CFL draft
      - KHL Junior Draft
        - KHL territorial pick
      - Major League Baseball draft
      - Major League Lacrosse draft
      - MLS SuperDraft
      - MLW Open Draft
      - NBA draft
      - NFL draft
      - NHL entry draft
      - National Lacrosse League entry draft
      - Philippine Basketball Association draft
      - WNBA draft
    - Salary cap
      - AFL salary cap
      - NHL salary cap
      - NRL salary cap
      - Designated Player Rule
    - Luxury tax
      - Major League Baseball luxury tax

==== Contract and labor relationship ====
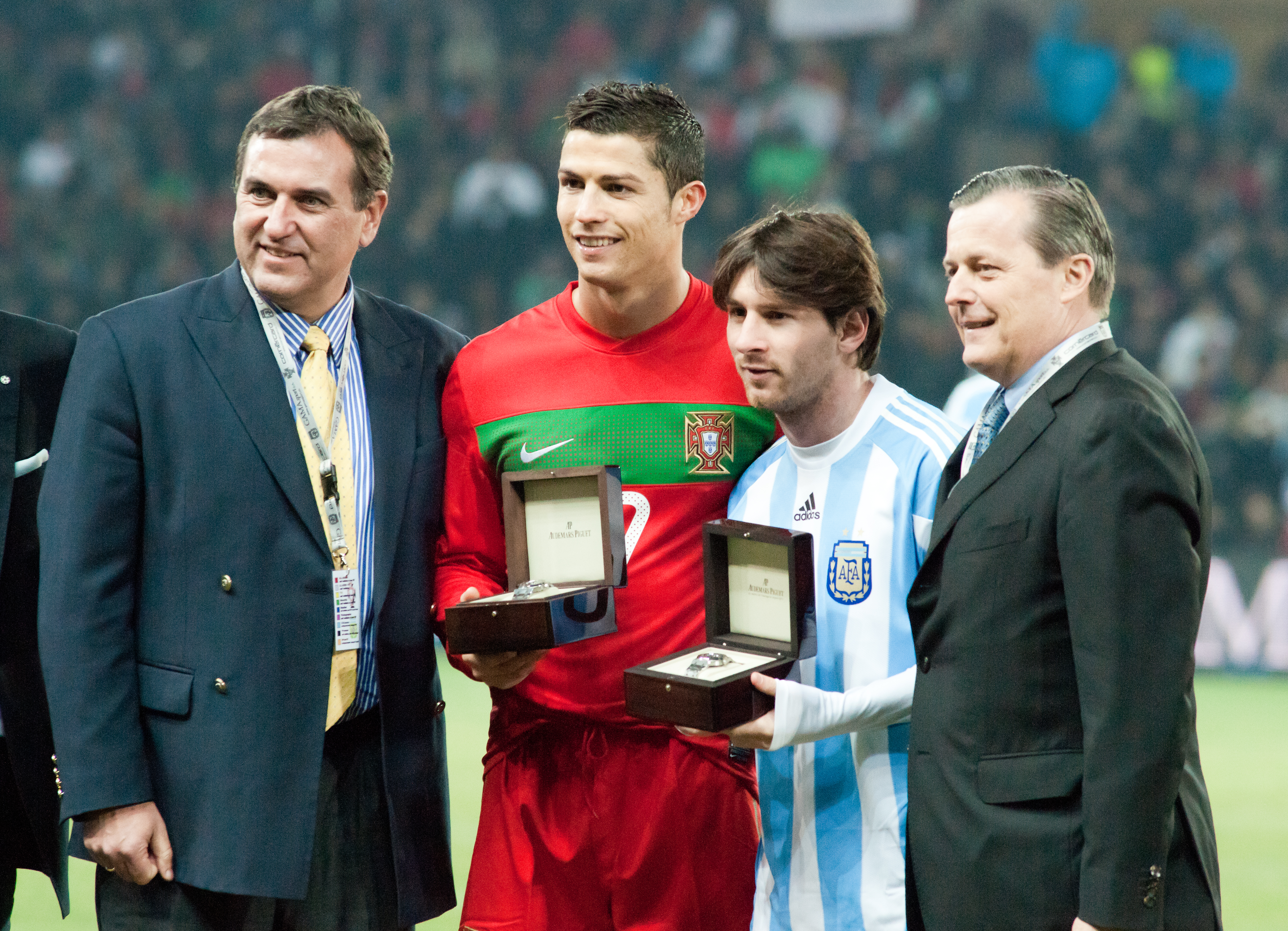
Cristiano Ronaldo and Lionel Messi, two athletes with the highest earnings in several years

- List of largest sports contracts
  - Forbes list of the world's highest-paid athletes
  - List of highest-paid Major League Baseball players
  - List of highest-paid NBA players by season
  - List of highest-paid NHL players by season
- Loan
- Offer sheet
- Reserve clause
- Free agent
  - Restricted free agent
- Trade
- Transfer (association football)
  - List of most expensive association football transfers
  - Free transfer
  - Transfer window
- Holdout
- Roster bonus
- Waivers
  - NFL
  - NHL
- Lockout
  - MLB lockout
  - NBA lockout
  - NFL lockout
  - NHL lockout
- Ice hockey contract
- Collective agreements
  - NBA collective bargaining agreement
  - NFL collective bargaining agreement
  - NHL Collective Bargaining Agreement
- Unions
  - Boardgame Players Association
  - Grand Prix Drivers' Association
  - Joint Association of Boxers
  - Polo Instructors and Players Association
  - Professional Darts Players Association
  - Professional Tennis Players Association
  - Women's International Squash Players Association
  - World Olympians Association
  - World Rally Drivers Alliance
  - Cricket
    - Professional Cricketers' Association
    - West Indies Players' Association
  - Rugby
    - Rugby Players' Association
    - Rugby Players Ireland
    - Welsh Rugby Players Association
  - Soccer
    - FIFPRO
    - Association of Contract Players
    - Association of Spanish Footballers
    - Football Players' Association of India
    - Professional Footballers' Association of Ireland
    - Italian Footballers' Association
    - Kenya Footballers Welfare Association
    - Norwegian Players' Association
    - PFA Scotland
    - Professional Footballers Association of Malaysia
    - Professional Footballers' Association
    - SAFAP
    - South African Football Players Union
    - Spillerforeningen
    - Union Nationale des Footballeurs Professionnels
    - Vereinigung der Vertragsfußballspieler
  - United States and Canada
    - Major League Baseball Players Association
    - United States Rugby Players Association
    - Basketball
      - National Basketball Players Association
      - Women's National Basketball Players Association
    - Gridiron football
      - NFL Players Association
      - Canadian Football League Players' Association
      - United Football Players Association
    - Soccer
      - U.S. National Soccer Team Players Association
      - U.S. Women's National Team Players Association
      - MLS Players Association
      - National Women's Soccer League Players Association
    - Ice hockey
      - National Hockey League Players' Association
      - Professional Women's Hockey League Players Association
      - Professional Hockey Players' Association
      - Canadian Hockey League Players' Association
  - ABA League Players Union
  - Australia
    - AFL Players Association
    - Australian Basketball Players' Association
    - Australian Cricketers' Association
    - Australian Netball Players' Association
    - Professional Footballers Australia
    - Rugby
      - Rugby League Players Association
      - Rugby Union Players' Association
  - Finnish Elite Athletes' Union
  - Gaelic Players Association
  - Japan Professional Baseball Players Association
  - Kontinental Hockey League Players' Trade Union
  - National Committee of the Chinese Educational, Scientific, Cultural, Medical and Sports Workers' Union
  - Officials
    - AFL Umpires Association
    - British American Football Referees' Association
    - Major League Baseball Umpires Association
    - National Basketball Referees Association
    - NFL Referees Association
    - Professional Soccer Referees Association
  - Coaches
    - Basketball Coaches Association of the Philippines
    - National Basketball Coaches Association
    - League Managers Association
    - National Association of Football Managers

== Sport science ==
- Computer science in sport

=== Sport medicine ===
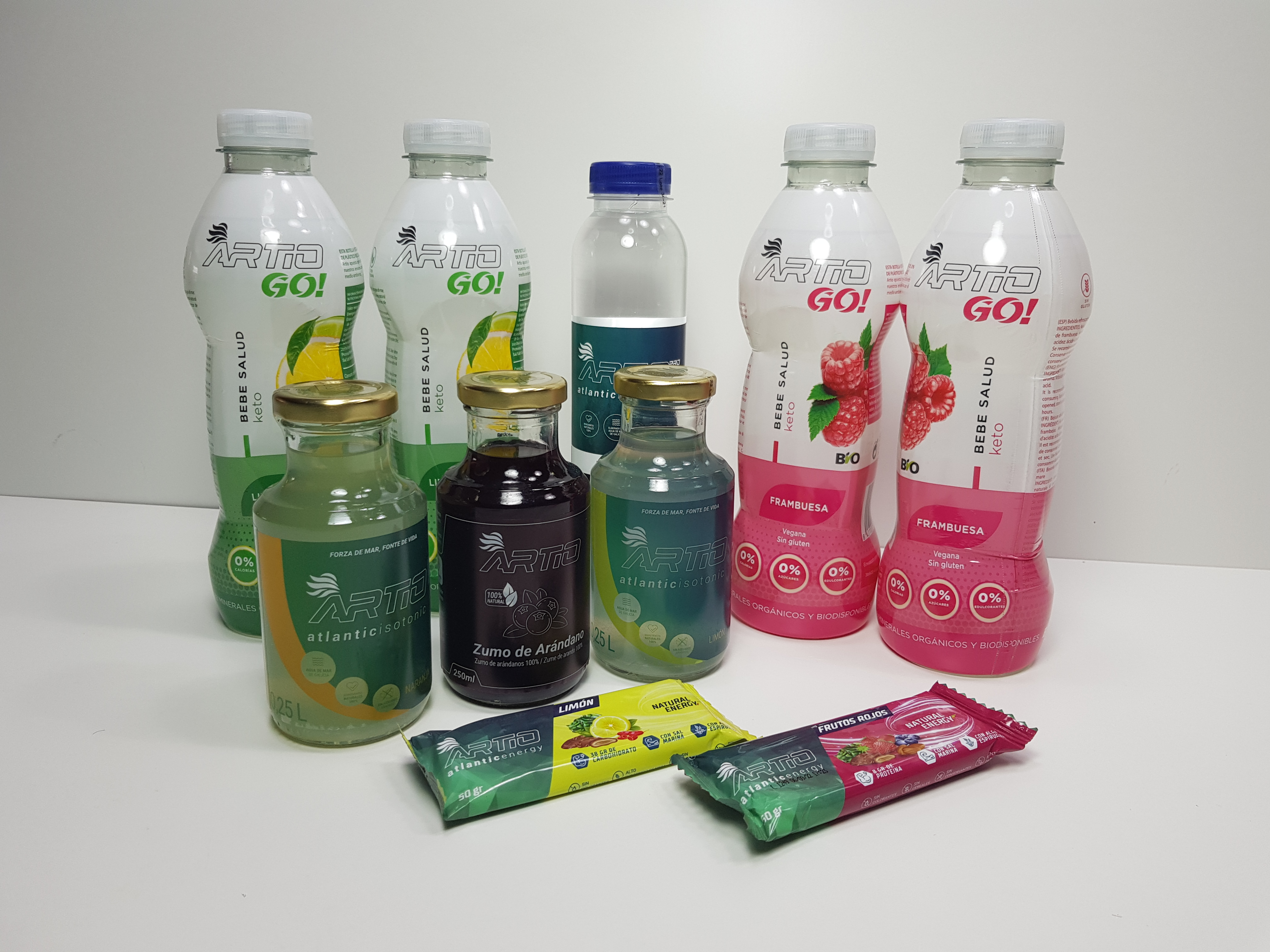
Sport drinks and energy bars

- Sports biomechanics
  - Biomechanics of baseball pitching
  - Biomechanics of sprint running
- Sports nutrition
  - Carbohydrate loading
  - Sports drink
- Sports injuries
  - Concussions in sport
    - Concussions in American football
    - Concussions in rugby union
    - Concussions in Australian sport
  - Running injuries
  - Swimming injuries
  - Tennis injuries
  - Volleyball injuries
- Doping in sport
  - List of doping cases in sport
- Impact of the COVID-19 pandemic on sports
  - Impact of the COVID-19 pandemic on American sports broadcasting
  - Impact of the COVID-19 pandemic on sports in the Republic of Ireland
  - Impact of the COVID-19 pandemic on Philippine sports
  - Impact of the COVID-19 pandemic on association football
  - Impact of the COVID-19 pandemic on baseball
  - Impact of the COVID-19 pandemic on basketball
  - Impact of the COVID-19 pandemic on combat sports
  - Impact of the COVID-19 pandemic on cricket
  - Impact of the COVID-19 pandemic on disc golf
  - Impact of the COVID-19 pandemic on Gaelic games
  - Impact of the COVID-19 pandemic on gridiron football
  - Impact of the COVID-19 pandemic on ice hockey
  - Impact of the COVID-19 pandemic on motorsport
  - Impact of the COVID-19 pandemic on rugby league
- Alcohol in association football
- Smoking in association football

=== Sport psychology ===
Sport psychology is the study of how psychological factors can impact engagement in professional and recreational sports, as well as how sports impact an athlete's psychological state. After becoming popular in the early 20th century, it is now a recognized scientific field which is relevant to many different sports. Modern sports psychologists often use a combination of goal setting, visualization techniques and preperformance routines to help athletes achieve their goals.

== Sport ethics and conduct ==
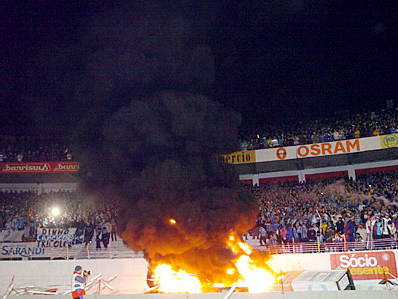
Hooliganism

- Gamesmanship
- Tanking
- Match fixing
  - Point shaving
  - Spot-fixing
  - List of match-fixing incidents
- Racism in sport
  - Antisemitism in the Olympic Games
  - Racism in association football
  - Racism in martial arts
  - Racism in sport in Australia
  - Racism in yoga
  - Rugby union and apartheid
- Sportsmanship
  - Spirit of the Game in Ultimate
  - Unwritten rules of baseball
- Trash talk
  - Sledging
- Violence in sports
  - Bench-clearing brawl
  - Hooliganism
    - Sports riot
    - Football hooliganism
  - Violence in baseball
    - Charging the mound
  - Violence in ice hockey

== Sport culture ==
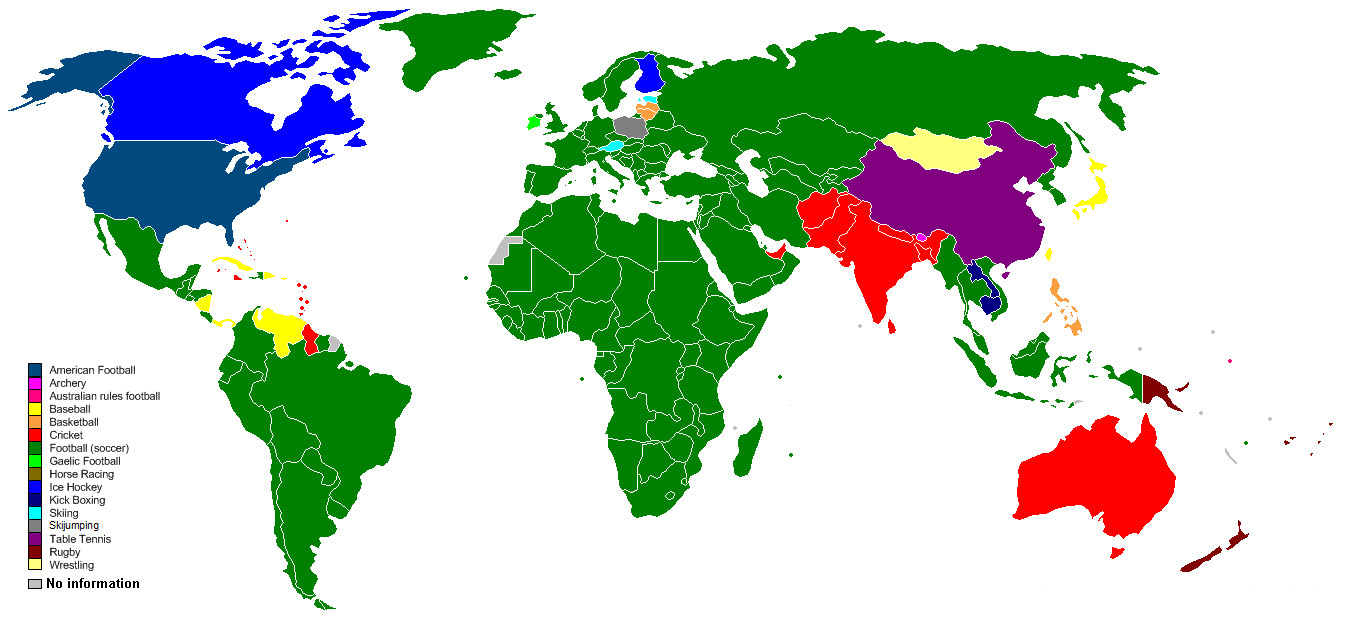
Popular sports by country

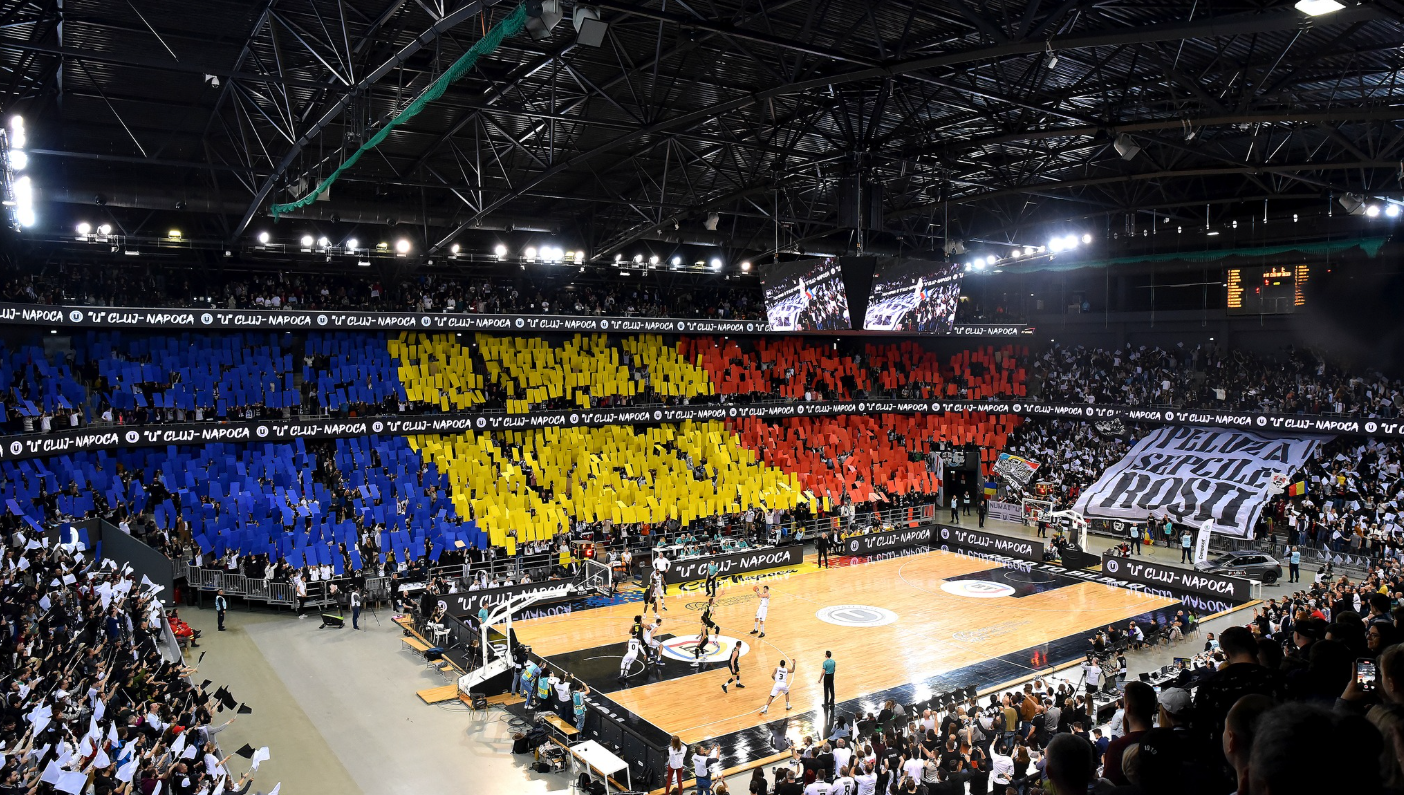
Tifo at basketball match

A football chant

Type of sport logo motifs

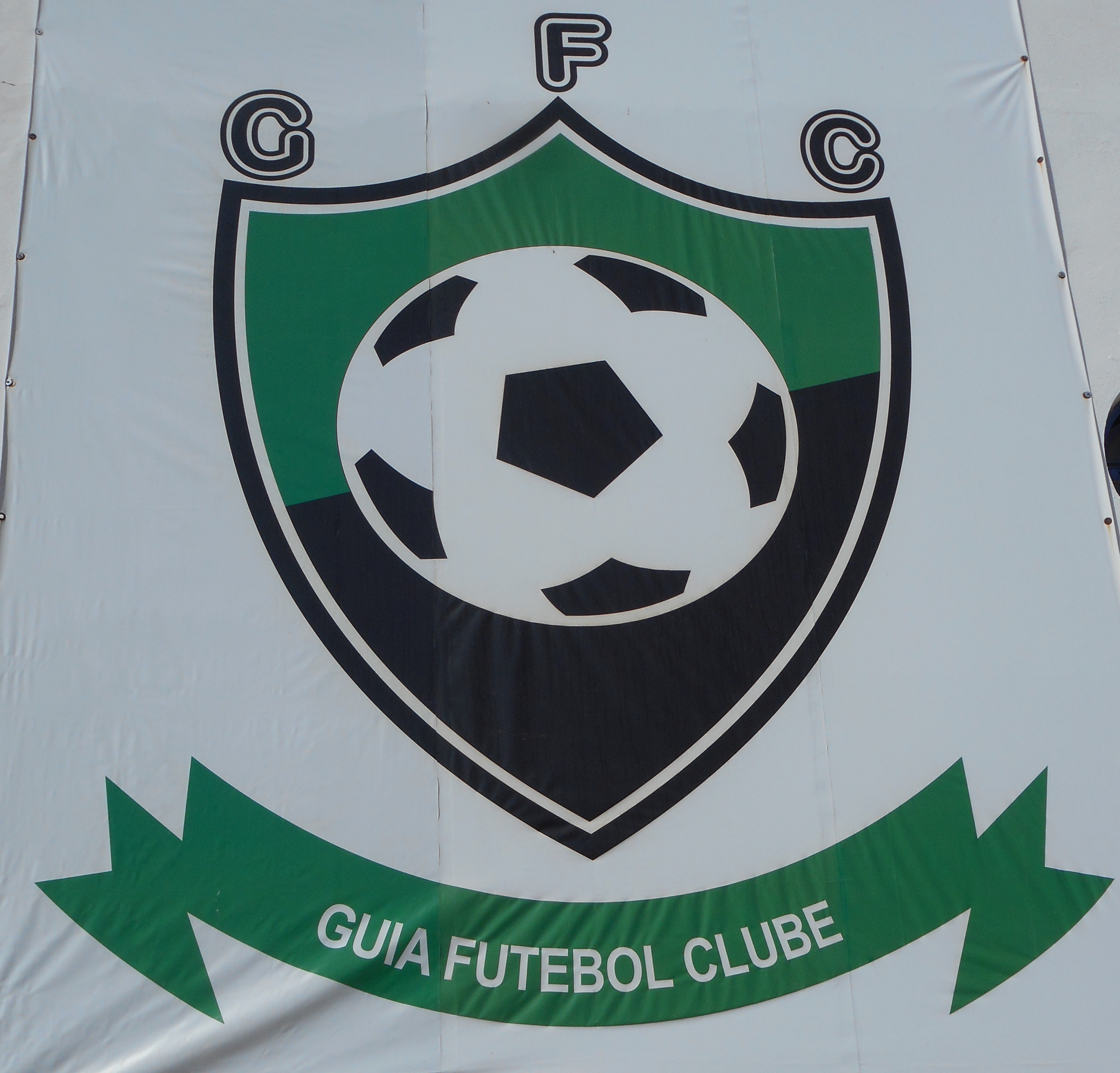
Crest

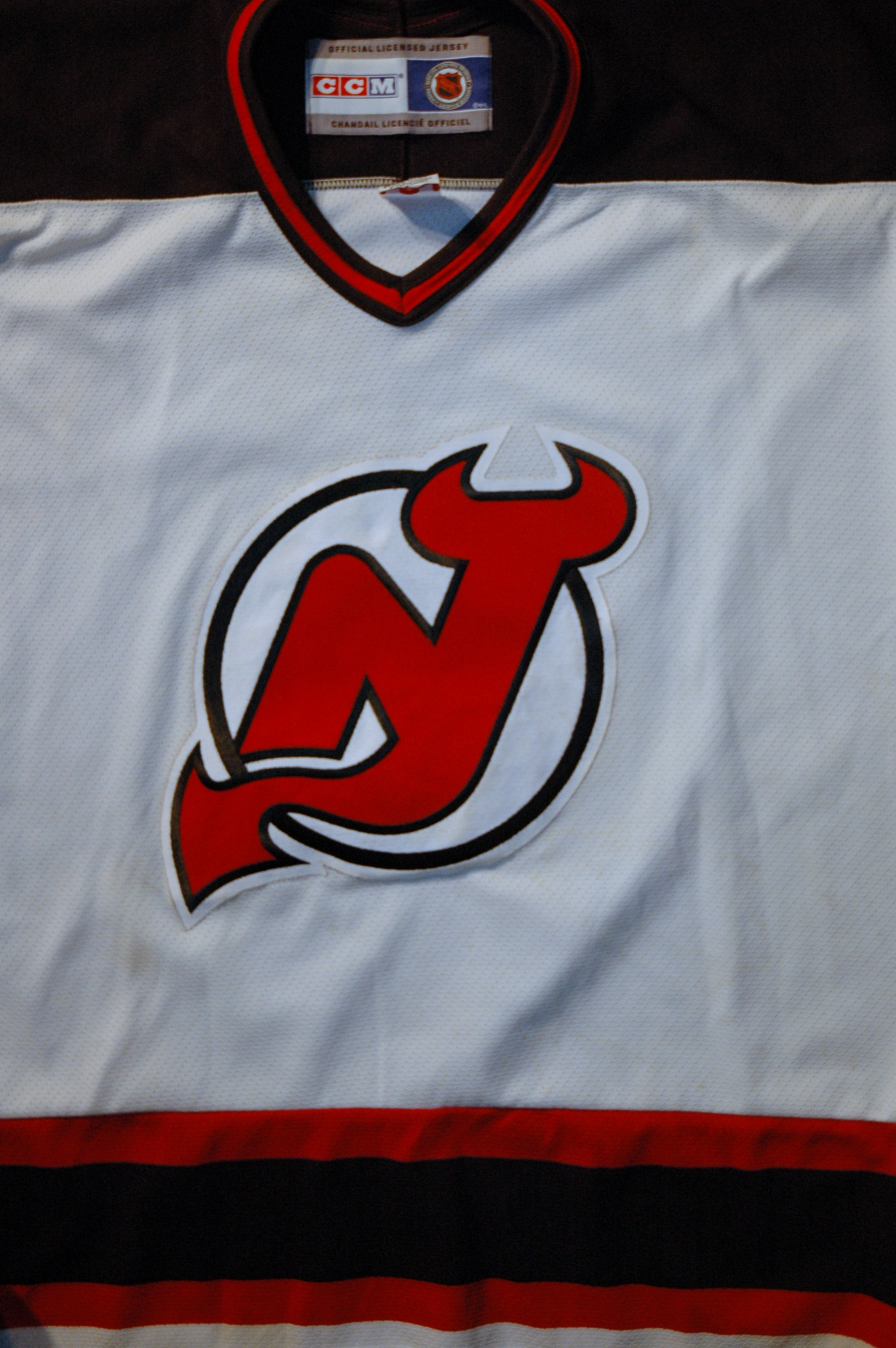
Ligature

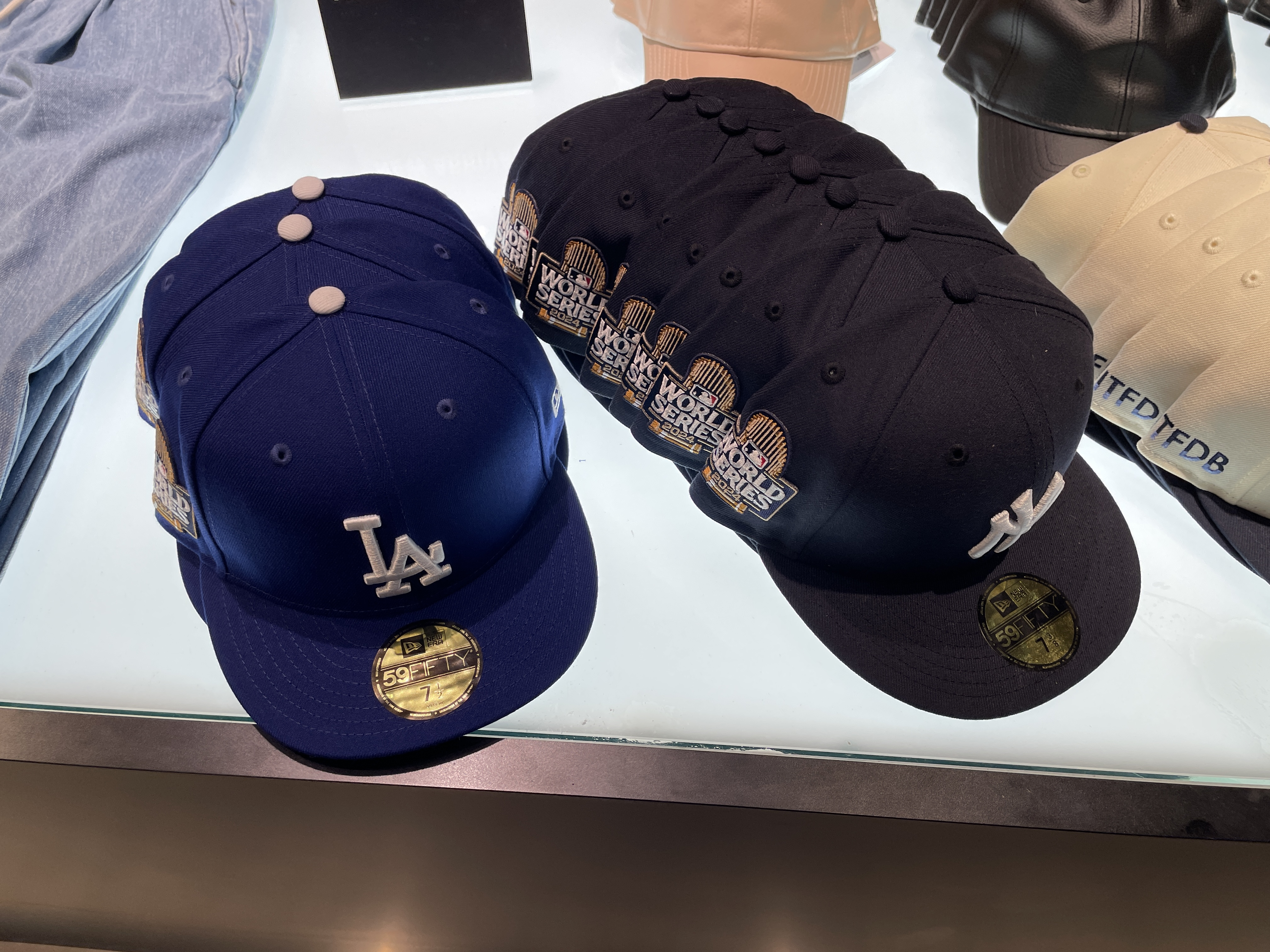
Monogram

- Sports fandom
  - Fan loyalty
  - FIFA Fan Festival
  - Tifo
    - Card stunt
    - Oranjegekte
  - Wave
  - Collegiate sport ritual in the United States
  - Supporters' group
    - Ultras (ice hockey)
    - Ultras
      - Barra brava
      - Torcida organizada
- National sport
- Western physical culture
- Indian physical culture
- Music at sporting events
  - Stadium anthem
  - Fight song
  - Olympics
    - Olympic Hymn
    - List of Olympic songs and anthems
  - Soccer
    - Football chant
    - FIFA Anthem
    - List of FIFA World Cup songs and anthems
    - UEFA Champions League Anthem
- Dances
  - Haka in sports
    - Haka performed by non-New Zealand sports teams
  - Cibi
  - Siva Tau
  - Wai khru ram muay
- Pre-game show
- Halftime show
- Post-game show
- Seventh-inning stretch
- Club crest
  - Badge
    - Star
    - FIFA Champions Badge
    - Scudetto
- Celebration
  - Goal celebration
  - Touchdown celebration
  - Try celebration
  - Gatorade shower
- Shirt swapping
- Sports memorabilia
  - Sticker album
  - Trading card
    - American football card
    - Association football card
    - Australian rules football card
    - Baseball card
    - Basketball card
    - Hockey card
    - Jersey cards
    - Rugby card
    - Rookie card
- GOAT
- Popular culture
  - Australian rules football in popular culture
  - Capoeira in popular culture
  - Hurling in popular culture
  - Ice hockey in popular culture
  - Toronto Maple Leafs in popular culture
  - Lethwei in popular culture
  - Muay Thai in popular culture
- Association football culture
  - Scudetto
- Australian rules football culture
- Baseball cheering culture in South Korea
- Fitness culture
- Surf culture
- Olympic culture
  - Olympic games ceremony
  - Olympic tattoo
  - Olympic symbols
    - Olympic emblem
    - Olympic flame
    - Olympic Oath
    - Olympic poster

=== Nicknames ===
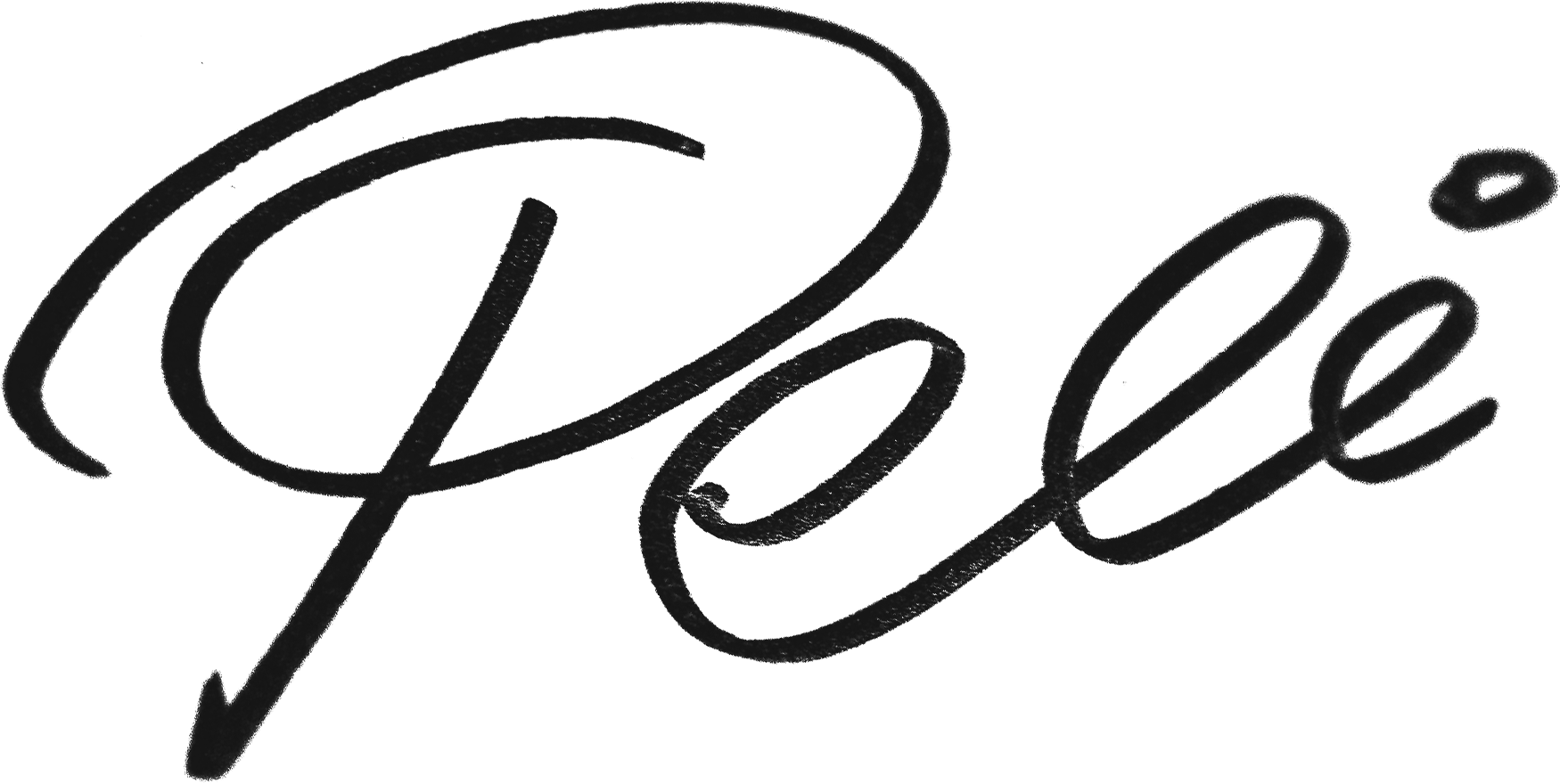
Pelé signature, Edson Arantes Do Nascimento nickname

- Athletic nickname
- Ring name
  - Shikona
  - Bugō
- List of sportspeople with nicknames
- List of baseball nicknames
  - List of baseball team nicknames
- List of nicknames used in cricket
- List of nicknames in basketball
  - List of nicknames used in Philippine basketball
- List of ice hockey nicknames
  - List of ice hockey line nicknames
- List of nicknames in motorsport
- Lists of national association football teams by nickname
  - List of non-FIFA and former national association football teams by nickname
  - List of AFC national association football teams by nickname
  - List of CAF national association football teams by nickname
  - List of CONCACAF national association football teams by nickname
  - List of CONMEBOL national association football teams by nickname
  - List of OFC national association football teams by nickname
  - List of UEFA national association football teams by nickname
- List of North American football nicknames
  - List of NFL nicknames
    - List of nicknamed NFL games and plays
- List of nicknames used in tennis
- Australian national sports team nicknames
- List of college team nicknames in the United States
  - List of college nickname changes in the United States
- List of Philippine college team nicknames

=== sport rivalries ===
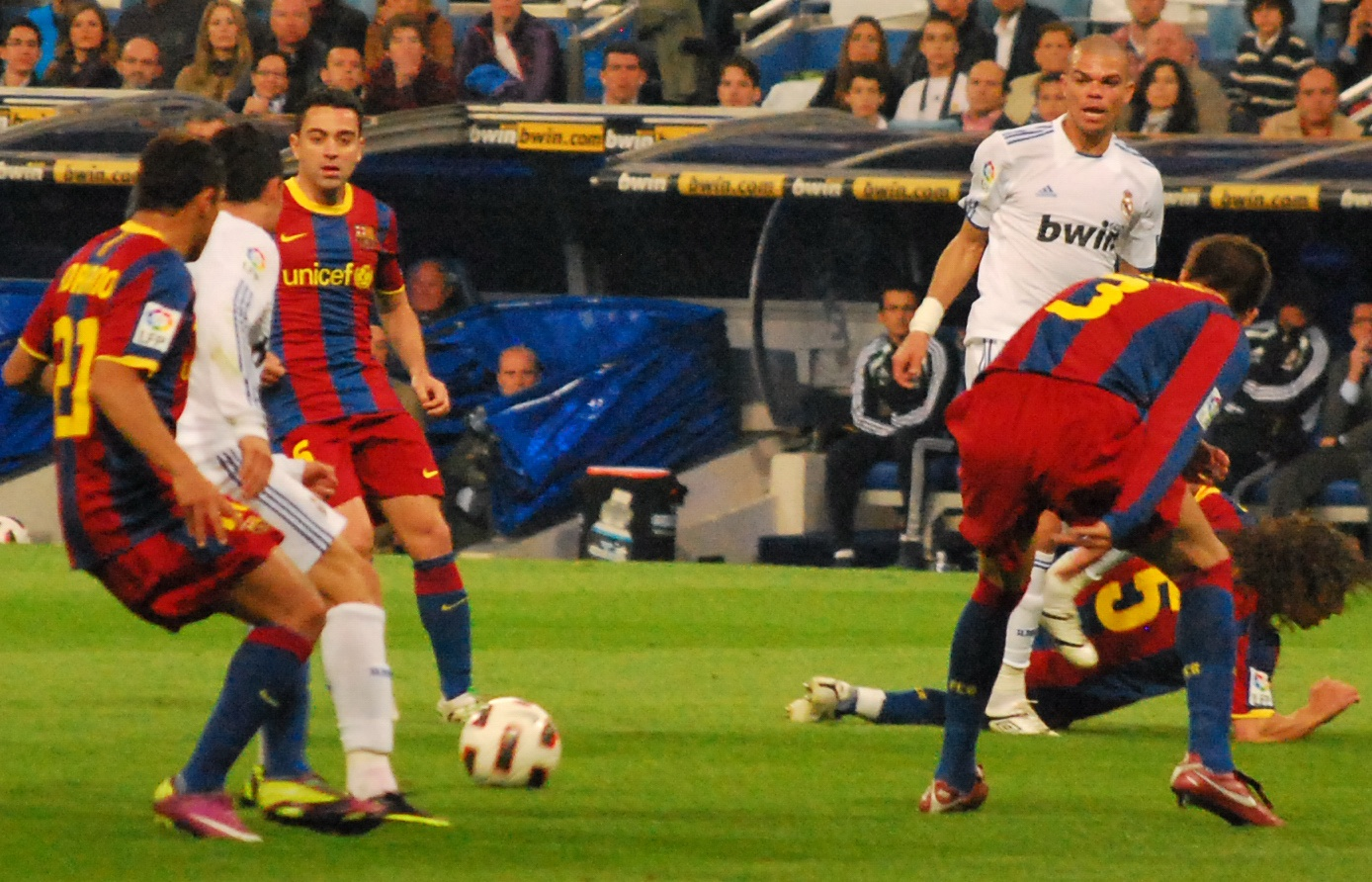
El Clasico

- Major League Baseball rivalries
  - Red Sox–Yankees rivalry
  - Dodgers–Giants rivalry
- List of NBA rivalries
- Football codes
  - List of association football rivalries
    - Messi–Ronaldo rivalry
    - List of association football club rivalries in Africa
    - List of association football club rivalries in Asia and Oceania
    - List of association football club rivalries in Europe
      - El Clásico
    - List of association football club rivalries in the Americas
  - Rivalries in the Australian Football League
  - List of NFL rivalries
  - Rubby League
    - Rivalries in the National Rugby League
    - Derbies in the Rugby Football League
- List of NHL rivalries
- List of tennis rivalries
  - Big Three
- University and college rivalry
  - List of college rivalries in the United States
    - List of NCAA college football rivalry games
- International rivalries
  - Afghanistan–Pakistan sports rivalries
  - Australia–England sports rivalries
  - Australia–United States sports rivalries
  - Canada–United States sports rivalries
  - India–Pakistan sports rivalries
  - Japan–South Korea sports rivalries
    - Japan–South Korea baseball rivalry
    - Japan–South Korea football rivalry
- List of derbies in Poland
- List of sports rivalries in the United Kingdom
- List of sports derbies in Ukraine

=== Traditional games ===
Sepak Takraw a traditional sport of Southeast Asia

- Traditional games of Brazil
- Traditional games of Myanmar
- Traditional games of China
- Traditional games of Cuba
- Traditional games of the Dominican Republic
- Traditional games in Indonesia
- Traditional games of Iran
- List of traditional Japanese games
- Traditional games of Korea
- Traditional games of Mexico
- List of traditional Naga games and sports
- Traditional games of New York City
- Traditional games of Nigeria
- Traditional games in the Philippines
- Traditional games of Singapore
- Traditional games of South Africa
- Traditional games of South Asia
  - Traditional games of Afghanistan
  - Bengali traditional games
  - Traditional games of India
    - Traditional games of Andhra Pradesh
  - Traditional games of Nepal
  - Traditional games of Pakistan
  - Traditional games of Sri Lanka
- Thai traditional games
- Traditional games of Tibet
- Traditional sports in the United Arab Emirates
- Traditional games of Venezuela
- List of Vietnamese traditional games

=== Religion and sport ===
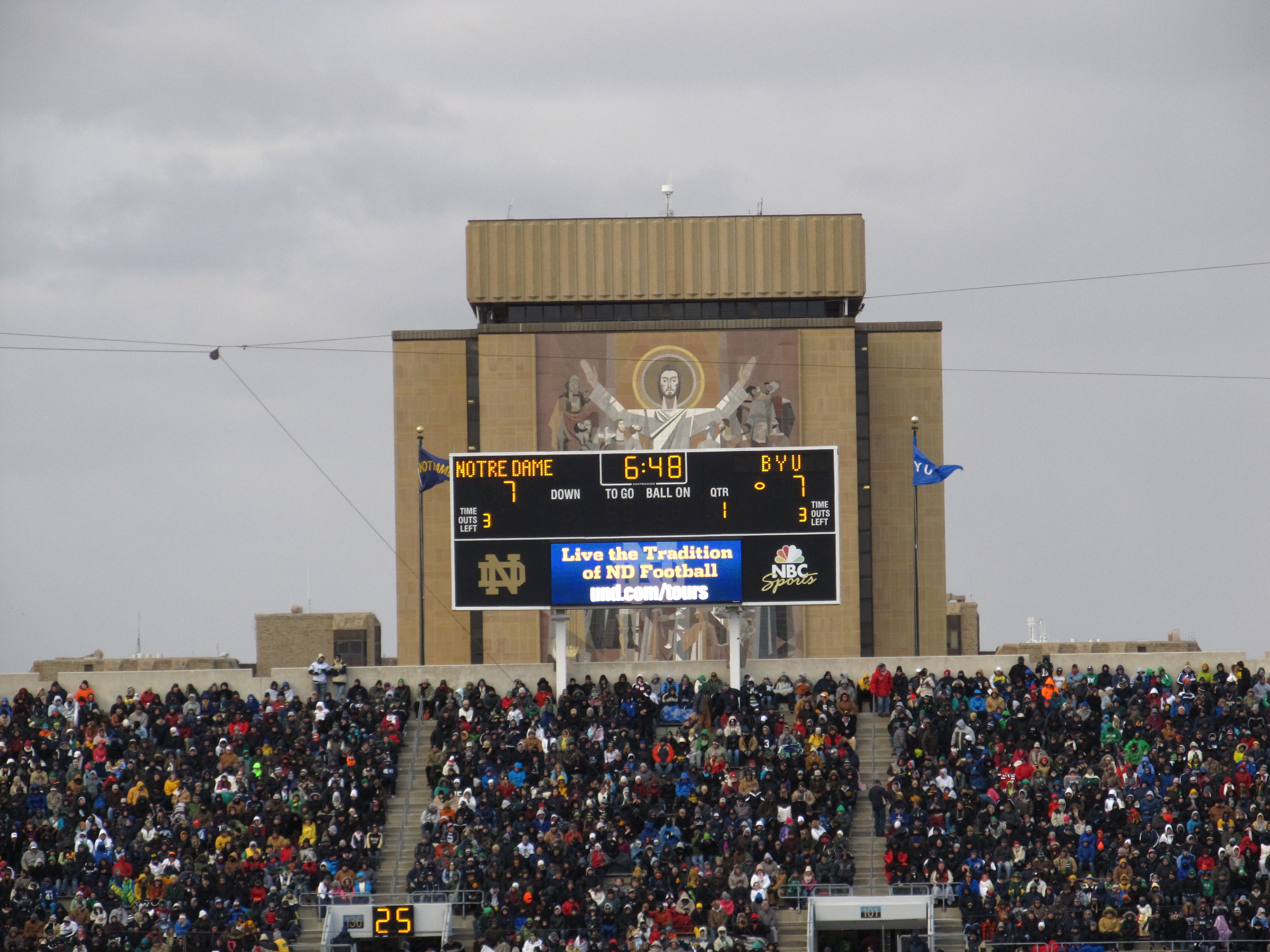
Touchdown Jesus

- Declaration of Sports
- Blessing of the Bikes
- Religious symbolism in U.S. sports team names and mascots
- New Testament athletic metaphors
- Sports ministry
- Muscular religion
  - Muscular Christianity
  - Muscular Hinduism
  - Muscular Islam
  - Muscular Judaism
- Association football
  - Christianity and association football
  - Islam and association football

== Sport and media ==
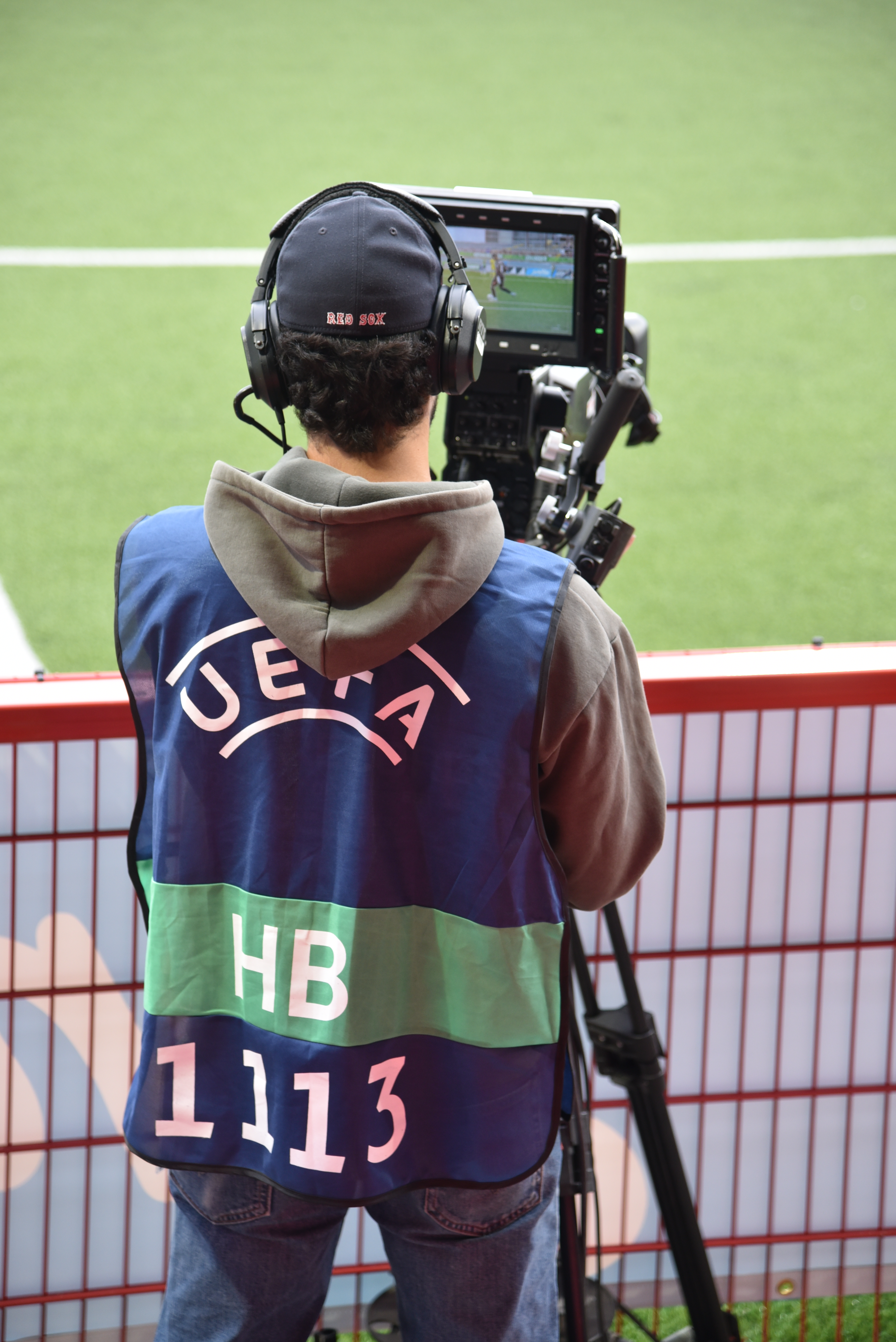
Broadcasting of soccer match

- Broadcasting of sports events
  - Blackout
  - International Broadcast Centre
  - List of sports announcers
  - Sports radio
    - Major League Baseball on the radio
    - College football on radio
  - Television
    - List of sports television channels
      - Sports team channels
    - List of sports television series
    - Olympics on television
      - Olympic Channel
      - Olympic Broadcasting Services
      - Olympics on Australian television
      - Olympics on United States television
    - List of sports television broadcast contracts
      - Bat and ball sports
        - List of current Major League Baseball broadcasters
        - Broadcasting contracts in cricketIndian Premier League on television
      - List of current NBA broadcasters
      - List of Formula One broadcasters
      - Ice hockey broadcasting
        - List of current National Hockey League broadcasters
      - Football codes
        - List of current NFL broadcasters
        - Soccer
          - List of UEFA Champions League broadcasters
          - English football on television
            - List of Premier League broadcasters
            - List of Premier League overseas broadcasters
          - List of La Liga broadcasters
          - List of Serie A broadcasters
          - List of current Major League Soccer broadcasters
            - List of Major League Soccer All-Star Game broadcasters
            - List of MLS Cup broadcasters
      - Lacrosse
        - Major League Lacrosse on television
        - National Lacrosse League on television
      - Tennis on television
      - Sports broadcasting contracts in India
      - Sports broadcasting contracts in Canada
      - Sports broadcasting contracts in the United States
      - Sports broadcasting contracts in the United Kingdom
- Sport communication
- Sports journalism
  - Sports photography
- Sports podcast
- Sports Emmy Award
- Sports novel
- Sports manga
- Sports film
  - List of sports films
- List of association football media

=== Sport magazines ===
- Media guide
- Pocket schedule
- Sports Illustrated
- European Sports Media

=== Sport television programs ===
- Pulp Sport
- SportsCenter

== Humanities and social sciences ==
- Philosophy of sport

=== Sport and Law ===
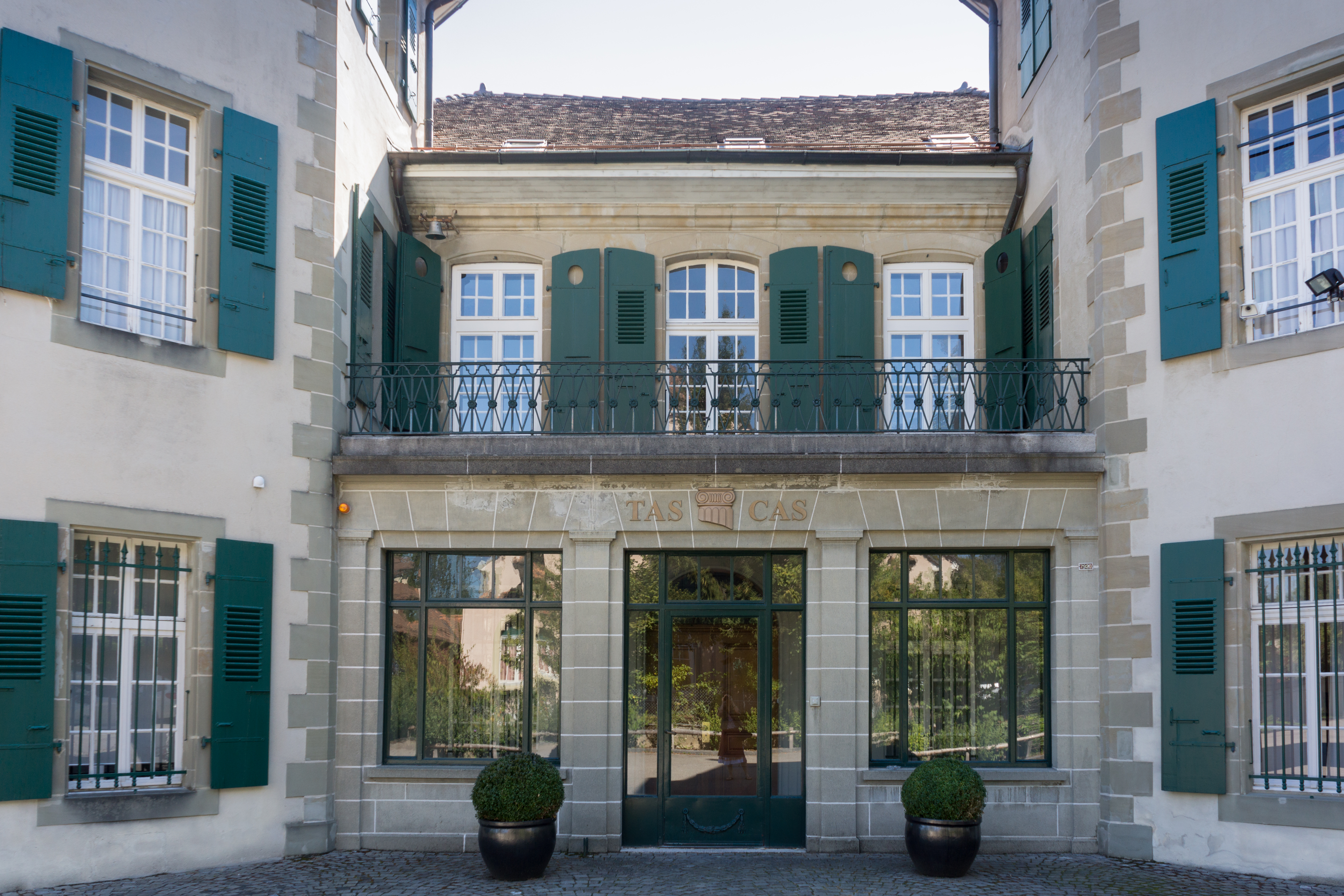
Court of Arbitration for Sport headquarters

General

- Court of Arbitration for Sport
- International Association of Sports Law
- Attempts to ban football games
- Sports law in the United States

American football

- American Needle, Inc. v. National Football League
- Two cases that involved the trademark rights of the Washington Redskins:
  - Harjo et al v. Pro Football, Inc.
  - Pro-Football, Inc. v. Harjo
- NCAA v. Board of Regents of the University of Oklahoma

Association football

- Association football contracts
- Pelé law
- Bosman ruling
- Fraser v. Major League Soccer
- Webster ruling

Baseball

- Baseball law
  - Baseball Rule
- Barry Bonds perjury case
- Federal Baseball Club v. National League
- Flood v. Kuhn
- Seitz decision
- Toolson v. New York Yankees

Basketball

- Haywood v. National Basketball Association
- Robertson v. National Basketball Association

Other sports

- Kolpak ruling

=== Sport and politics ===
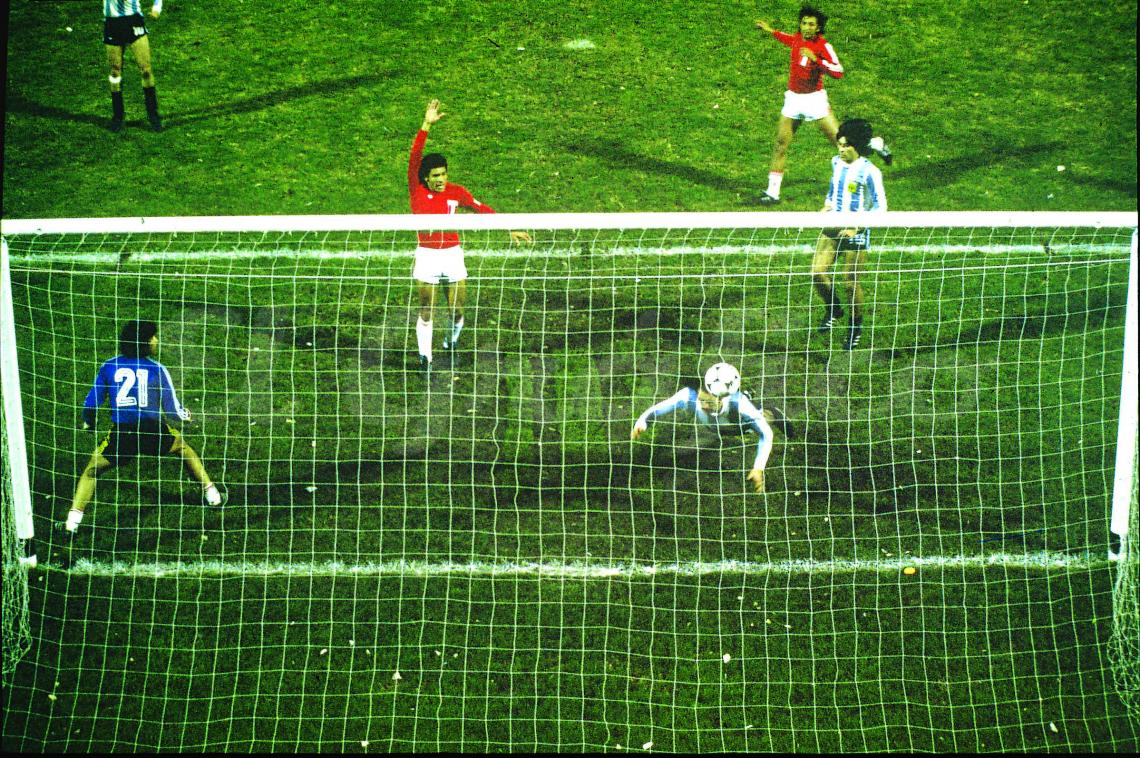
It is alleged political interference in the defeat of Peruvian team against Argentina at 1978 World Cup

- Nationalism and sport
- Ministry of Sports
- Racism in sport
- Sportswashing
- Sport policies of the Arab League
- Sport policies of the European Union
- Arirang Mass Games
- Sport diplomacy
  - Cricket diplomacy
  - Ping-pong diplomacy
  - Stadium diplomacy
- Ceremonial first pitch
- Ceremonial first puck
- Oropolitics
- Stadium subsidy
- Association football and politics
- List of Olympic Games boycotts

=== Sociology of sport ===
The sociology of sport is a subfield of sociology which aims to study sports through the lens of interactions between different groups and cultures. The field has also investigated how various gender divides in sports can influence feminist movements.

== See also ==
- Index of basketball-related articles

=== Sports-related outlines ===
- Outline of association football
- Outline of auto racing
- Outline of baseball
- Outline of basketball
- Outline of canoeing and kayaking
- Outline of chess
- Outline of cycling
- Outline of exercise
- Outline of fencing
- Outline of golf
- Outline of martial arts
- Outline of motorcycling
- Outline of running
- Outline of sailing
- Outline of skiing
- Outline of tennis
