= Major achievements in association football by nation =

This article contains lists of achievements in major senior-level international association football, futsal and beach soccer tournaments according to first-place, second-place and third-place results obtained by teams representing different nations. The objective is not to create combined medal tables; the focus is on listing the best positions achieved by teams in major international tournaments, ranking the nations according to the most number of podiums accomplished by teams of these nations.

== Results ==
For the making of these lists, results from following major international tournaments were consulted:

Form	Governing body	Tournament	Edition		
Form	Governing body	Tournament	First	Latest	Next
Association football	FIFA & IOC	Football at the Summer Olympics (quadrennially)	1900	2024	2028
Association football	FIFA	FIFA World Cup (quadrennially)	1930	2026	2030
Association football	FIFA	FIFA Women's World Cup (quadrennially)	1991	2023	2027
Association football	FIFA	FIFA Confederations Cup (quadrennially)	1992	2017	Defunct
Association football	FIFA	FIFA Club World Cup (quadrennially)	2000	2025	2029
Association football	FIFA	FIFA Women's Club World Cup (quadrennially)	2028	2028	2032
Futsal	FIFA	FIFA Futsal World Cup (quadrennially)	1989	2024	2028
Futsal	FIFA	FIFA Futsal Women's World Cup (quadrennially)	2025	2025	2029
Beach soccer	FIFA	FIFA Beach Soccer World Cup (biennially)	1995	2025	2027

- FIFA: Fédération Internationale de Football Association
- IOC: International Olympic Committee

Medals earned by athletes from defunct National Olympic Committees (NOCs) or historical teams are NOT merged with the results achieved by their immediate successor states. The International Olympic Committee (IOC) does NOT combine medals of these nations or teams.

The tables are pre-sorted by total number of first-place results, second-place results and third-place results, respectively. When equal ranks are given, nations are listed in alphabetical order.

=== Association football, futsal and beach soccer ===
==== Men and women ====
Last updated after the 2025 FIFA Futsal Women's World Cup (As of 7 December 2025)
		Association football						Futsal		Beach soccer		Number of			
		Olympic Games		World Cup		Confederations Cup	Club World Cup	World Cup		World Cup		Number of			
Rk.	Nation	Men	Women	Men	Women	Men	Men	Men	Women	Men	Women	1st place, gold medalist(s)	2nd place, silver medalist(s)	3rd place, bronze medalist(s)	Total
1	Brazil	1st place, gold medalist(s)	2nd place, silver medalist(s)	1st place, gold medalist(s)	2nd place, silver medalist(s)	1st place, gold medalist(s)	1st place, gold medalist(s)	1st place, gold medalist(s)	1st place, gold medalist(s)	1st place, gold medalist(s)		7	2	0	9
2	Spain	1st place, gold medalist(s)		1st place, gold medalist(s)	1st place, gold medalist(s)	2nd place, silver medalist(s)	1st place, gold medalist(s)	1st place, gold medalist(s)	3rd place, bronze medalist(s)	2nd place, silver medalist(s)		5	2	1	8
3	United States	2nd place, silver medalist(s)	1st place, gold medalist(s)	3rd place, bronze medalist(s)	1st place, gold medalist(s)	2nd place, silver medalist(s)		2nd place, silver medalist(s)		2nd place, silver medalist(s)		2	4	1	7
4	Germany	2nd place, silver medalist(s)	1st place, gold medalist(s)	1st place, gold medalist(s)	1st place, gold medalist(s)	1st place, gold medalist(s)	1st place, gold medalist(s)					5	1	0	6
5	Argentina	1st place, gold medalist(s)		1st place, gold medalist(s)		1st place, gold medalist(s)	2nd place, silver medalist(s)	1st place, gold medalist(s)		3rd place, bronze medalist(s)		4	1	1	6
6	Italy	1st place, gold medalist(s)		1st place, gold medalist(s)		3rd place, bronze medalist(s)	1st place, gold medalist(s)	2nd place, silver medalist(s)		2nd place, silver medalist(s)		3	2	1	6
7	Japan	3rd place, bronze medalist(s)	2nd place, silver medalist(s)		1st place, gold medalist(s)	2nd place, silver medalist(s)	2nd place, silver medalist(s)			2nd place, silver medalist(s)		1	4	1	6
8	France	1st place, gold medalist(s)		1st place, gold medalist(s)		1st place, gold medalist(s)	2nd place, silver medalist(s)			1st place, gold medalist(s)		4	1	0	5
9	Portugal			3rd place, bronze medalist(s)		3rd place, bronze medalist(s)		1st place, gold medalist(s)	2nd place, silver medalist(s)	1st place, gold medalist(s)		2	1	2	5
10	Mexico	1st place, gold medalist(s)				1st place, gold medalist(s)	2nd place, silver medalist(s)			2nd place, silver medalist(s)		2	2	0	4
11	England^{†}			1st place, gold medalist(s)	2nd place, silver medalist(s)		1st place, gold medalist(s)			3rd place, bronze medalist(s)		2	1	1	4
12	Sweden	1st place, gold medalist(s)	2nd place, silver medalist(s)	2nd place, silver medalist(s)	2nd place, silver medalist(s)							1	3	0	4
13	Netherlands	3rd place, bronze medalist(s)		2nd place, silver medalist(s)	2nd place, silver medalist(s)			2nd place, silver medalist(s)				0	3	1	4
14	Uruguay	1st place, gold medalist(s)		1st place, gold medalist(s)						2nd place, silver medalist(s)		2	1	0	3
15	Norway	3rd place, bronze medalist(s)	1st place, gold medalist(s)		1st place, gold medalist(s)							2	0	1	3
16	Chile	3rd place, bronze medalist(s)		3rd place, bronze medalist(s)		2nd place, silver medalist(s)						0	1	2	3
17	Canada	1st place, gold medalist(s)	1st place, gold medalist(s)									2	0	0	2
18	Cameroon	1st place, gold medalist(s)				2nd place, silver medalist(s)						1	1	0	2
18	Czechoslovakia^{*}	1st place, gold medalist(s)		2nd place, silver medalist(s)								1	1	0	2
18	Denmark	2nd place, silver medalist(s)				1st place, gold medalist(s)						1	1	0	2
18	Hungary	1st place, gold medalist(s)		2nd place, silver medalist(s)								1	1	0	2
18	Russia							2nd place, silver medalist(s)		1st place, gold medalist(s)		1	1	0	2
		Association football						Futsal		Beach soccer		Number of			
		Olympic Games		World Cup		Confederations Cup	Club World Cup	World Cup		World Cup		Number of			
Rk.	Nation	Men	Women	Men	Women	Men	Men	Men	Women	Men	Women	1st place, gold medalist(s)	2nd place, silver medalist(s)	3rd place, bronze medalist(s)	Total
23	Belgium	1st place, gold medalist(s)		3rd place, bronze medalist(s)								1	0	1	2
23	Poland	1st place, gold medalist(s)		3rd place, bronze medalist(s)								1	0	1	2
23	West Germany^{*}	3rd place, bronze medalist(s)		1st place, gold medalist(s)								1	0	1	2
26	China		2nd place, silver medalist(s)		2nd place, silver medalist(s)							0	2	0	2
26	Saudi Arabia					2nd place, silver medalist(s)	2nd place, silver medalist(s)					0	2	0	2
26	Switzerland	2nd place, silver medalist(s)								2nd place, silver medalist(s)		0	2	0	2
29	Austria	2nd place, silver medalist(s)		3rd place, bronze medalist(s)								0	1	1	2
29	Morocco	3rd place, bronze medalist(s)					2nd place, silver medalist(s)					0	1	1	2
31	Iran							3rd place, bronze medalist(s)		3rd place, bronze medalist(s)		0	0	2	2
31	South Korea	3rd place, bronze medalist(s)					3rd place, bronze medalist(s)					0	0	2	2
31	Turkey			3rd place, bronze medalist(s)		3rd place, bronze medalist(s)						0	0	2	2
34	East Germany^{*}	1st place, gold medalist(s)										1	0	0	1
34	Great Britain^{‡}	1st place, gold medalist(s)										1	0	0	1
34	Nigeria	1st place, gold medalist(s)										1	0	0	1
34	Soviet Union^{*}	1st place, gold medalist(s)										1	0	0	1
34	Yugoslavia^{*}	1st place, gold medalist(s)										1	0	0	1
39	Australia					2nd place, silver medalist(s)						0	1	0	1
39	Belarus									2nd place, silver medalist(s)		0	1	0	1
39	Bulgaria	2nd place, silver medalist(s)										0	1	0	1
39	Croatia			2nd place, silver medalist(s)								0	1	0	1
39	Democratic Republic of the Congo						2nd place, silver medalist(s)					0	1	0	1
39	Ecuador						2nd place, silver medalist(s)					0	1	0	1
39	Paraguay	2nd place, silver medalist(s)										0	1	0	1
39	Peru									2nd place, silver medalist(s)		0	1	0	1
39	Tahiti^{†}									2nd place, silver medalist(s)		0	1	0	1
39	United Arab Emirates						2nd place, silver medalist(s)					0	1	0	1
49	Colombia						3rd place, bronze medalist(s)					0	0	1	1
49	Costa Rica						3rd place, bronze medalist(s)					0	0	1	1
49	Czech Republic					3rd place, bronze medalist(s)						0	0	1	1
49	Egypt						3rd place, bronze medalist(s)					0	0	1	1
49	Ghana	3rd place, bronze medalist(s)										0	0	1	1
49	New Zealand						3rd place, bronze medalist(s)					0	0	1	1
49	Qatar						3rd place, bronze medalist(s)					0	0	1	1
49	Ukraine							3rd place, bronze medalist(s)				0	0	1	1
49	United Team of Germany^{*}	3rd place, bronze medalist(s)										0	0	1	1

^{*}Defunct National Olympic Committees (NOCs) or historical teams are shown in italic.
^{†}FIFA affiliates and non International Olympic Committee (IOC) members.
^{‡}International Olympic Committee (IOC) members and non FIFA affiliates.

==== Men ====
Last updated after the 2025 FIFA Club World Cup (As of 13 July 2025)
		Association football				Futsal	Beach soccer	Number of			
		Olympic Games	World Cup	Confederations Cup	Club World Cup	World Cup	World Cup	Number of			
Rk.	Nation	Men	Men	Men	Men	Men	Men	1st place, gold medalist(s)	2nd place, silver medalist(s)	3rd place, bronze medalist(s)	Total
1	Brazil	1st place, gold medalist(s)	1st place, gold medalist(s)	1st place, gold medalist(s)	1st place, gold medalist(s)	1st place, gold medalist(s)	1st place, gold medalist(s)	6	0	0	6
2	Spain	1st place, gold medalist(s)	1st place, gold medalist(s)	2nd place, silver medalist(s)	1st place, gold medalist(s)	1st place, gold medalist(s)	2nd place, silver medalist(s)	4	2	0	6
3	Argentina	1st place, gold medalist(s)	1st place, gold medalist(s)	1st place, gold medalist(s)	2nd place, silver medalist(s)	1st place, gold medalist(s)	3rd place, bronze medalist(s)	4	1	1	6
4	Italy	1st place, gold medalist(s)	1st place, gold medalist(s)	3rd place, bronze medalist(s)	1st place, gold medalist(s)	2nd place, silver medalist(s)	2nd place, silver medalist(s)	3	2	1	6
5	France	1st place, gold medalist(s)	1st place, gold medalist(s)	1st place, gold medalist(s)	2nd place, silver medalist(s)		1st place, gold medalist(s)	4	1	0	5
6	United States	2nd place, silver medalist(s)	3rd place, bronze medalist(s)	2nd place, silver medalist(s)		2nd place, silver medalist(s)	2nd place, silver medalist(s)	0	4	1	5
7	Germany	2nd place, silver medalist(s)	1st place, gold medalist(s)	1st place, gold medalist(s)	1st place, gold medalist(s)			3	1	0	4
8	Mexico	1st place, gold medalist(s)		1st place, gold medalist(s)	2nd place, silver medalist(s)		2nd place, silver medalist(s)	2	2	0	4
9	Portugal		3rd place, bronze medalist(s)	3rd place, bronze medalist(s)		1st place, gold medalist(s)	1st place, gold medalist(s)	2	0	2	4
10	Japan	3rd place, bronze medalist(s)		2nd place, silver medalist(s)	2nd place, silver medalist(s)		2nd place, silver medalist(s)	0	3	1	4
11	Uruguay	1st place, gold medalist(s)	1st place, gold medalist(s)				2nd place, silver medalist(s)	2	1	0	3
12	England^{†}		1st place, gold medalist(s)		1st place, gold medalist(s)		3rd place, bronze medalist(s)	2	0	1	3
13	Netherlands	3rd place, bronze medalist(s)	2nd place, silver medalist(s)			2nd place, silver medalist(s)		0	2	1	3
14	Chile	3rd place, bronze medalist(s)	3rd place, bronze medalist(s)	2nd place, silver medalist(s)				0	1	2	3
15	Cameroon	1st place, gold medalist(s)		2nd place, silver medalist(s)				1	1	0	2
15	Czechoslovakia^{*}	1st place, gold medalist(s)	2nd place, silver medalist(s)					1	1	0	2
15	Denmark	2nd place, silver medalist(s)		1st place, gold medalist(s)				1	1	0	2
15	Hungary	1st place, gold medalist(s)	2nd place, silver medalist(s)					1	1	0	2
15	Russia					2nd place, silver medalist(s)	1st place, gold medalist(s)	1	1	0	2
15	Sweden	1st place, gold medalist(s)	2nd place, silver medalist(s)					1	1	0	2
21	Belgium	1st place, gold medalist(s)	3rd place, bronze medalist(s)					1	0	1	2
21	Poland	1st place, gold medalist(s)	3rd place, bronze medalist(s)					1	0	1	2
21	West Germany^{*}	3rd place, bronze medalist(s)	1st place, gold medalist(s)					1	0	1	2
24	Saudi Arabia			2nd place, silver medalist(s)	2nd place, silver medalist(s)			0	2	0	2
24	Switzerland	2nd place, silver medalist(s)					2nd place, silver medalist(s)	0	2	0	2
26	Austria	2nd place, silver medalist(s)	3rd place, bronze medalist(s)					0	1	1	2
27	Iran					3rd place, bronze medalist(s)	3rd place, bronze medalist(s)	0	0	2	2
27	South Korea	3rd place, bronze medalist(s)			3rd place, bronze medalist(s)			0	0	2	2
27	Turkey		3rd place, bronze medalist(s)	3rd place, bronze medalist(s)				0	0	2	2
		Association football				Futsal	Beach soccer	Number of			
		Olympic Games	World Cup	Confederations Cup	Club World Cup	World Cup	World Cup	Number of			
Rk.	Nation	Men	Men	Men	Men	Men	Men	1st place, gold medalist(s)	2nd place, silver medalist(s)	3rd place, bronze medalist(s)	Total
30	Canada	1st place, gold medalist(s)						1	0	0	1
30	East Germany^{*}	1st place, gold medalist(s)						1	0	0	1
30	Great Britain^{‡}	1st place, gold medalist(s)						1	0	0	1
30	Nigeria	1st place, gold medalist(s)						1	0	0	1
30	Soviet Union^{*}	1st place, gold medalist(s)						1	0	0	1
30	Yugoslavia^{*}	1st place, gold medalist(s)						1	0	0	1
36	Australia			2nd place, silver medalist(s)				0	1	0	1
36	Belarus						2nd place, silver medalist(s)	0	1	0	1
36	Bulgaria	2nd place, silver medalist(s)						0	1	0	1
36	Croatia		2nd place, silver medalist(s)					0	1	0	1
36	Democratic Republic of the Congo				2nd place, silver medalist(s)			0	1	0	1
36	Ecuador				2nd place, silver medalist(s)			0	1	0	1
36	Morocco				2nd place, silver medalist(s)			0	1	0	1
36	Paraguay	2nd place, silver medalist(s)						0	1	0	1
36	Peru						2nd place, silver medalist(s)	0	1	0	1
36	Tahiti^{†}						2nd place, silver medalist(s)	0	1	0	1
36	United Arab Emirates				2nd place, silver medalist(s)			0	1	0	1
47	Colombia				3rd place, bronze medalist(s)			0	0	1	1
47	Costa Rica				3rd place, bronze medalist(s)			0	0	1	1
47	Czech Republic			3rd place, bronze medalist(s)				0	0	1	1
47	Egypt				3rd place, bronze medalist(s)			0	0	1	1
47	Ghana	3rd place, bronze medalist(s)						0	0	1	1
47	New Zealand				3rd place, bronze medalist(s)			0	0	1	1
47	Norway	3rd place, bronze medalist(s)						0	0	1	1
47	Qatar				3rd place, bronze medalist(s)			0	0	1	1
47	Ukraine					3rd place, bronze medalist(s)		0	0	1	1
47	United Team of Germany^{*}	3rd place, bronze medalist(s)						0	0	1	1

^{*}Defunct National Olympic Committees (NOCs) or historical teams are shown in italic.
^{†}FIFA affiliates and non International Olympic Committee (IOC) members.
^{‡}International Olympic Committee (IOC) members and non FIFA affiliates.

=== Association football ===
==== Men and women ====
Last updated after the 2026 FIFA Men's World Cup (As of 19 July 2026)
		Association football					Number of			
		Olympic Games		World Cup		Confederations Cup	Number of			
Rk.	Nation	Men	Women	Men	Women	Men	1st place, gold medalist(s)	2nd place, silver medalist(s)	3rd place, bronze medalist(s)	Total
1	Germany	2nd place, silver medalist(s)	1st place, gold medalist(s)	1st place, gold medalist(s)	1st place, gold medalist(s)	1st place, gold medalist(s)	4	1	0	5
2	Brazil	1st place, gold medalist(s)	2nd place, silver medalist(s)	1st place, gold medalist(s)	2nd place, silver medalist(s)	1st place, gold medalist(s)	3	2	0	5
3	United States	2nd place, silver medalist(s)	1st place, gold medalist(s)	3rd place, bronze medalist(s)	1st place, gold medalist(s)	2nd place, silver medalist(s)	2	2	1	5
4	Spain	1st place, gold medalist(s)		1st place, gold medalist(s)	1st place, gold medalist(s)	2nd place, silver medalist(s)	3	1	0	4
5	Sweden	1st place, gold medalist(s)	2nd place, silver medalist(s)	2nd place, silver medalist(s)	2nd place, silver medalist(s)		1	3	0	4
6	Japan	3rd place, bronze medalist(s)	2nd place, silver medalist(s)		1st place, gold medalist(s)	2nd place, silver medalist(s)	1	2	1	4
7	Argentina	1st place, gold medalist(s)		1st place, gold medalist(s)		1st place, gold medalist(s)	3	0	0	3
7	France	1st place, gold medalist(s)		1st place, gold medalist(s)		1st place, gold medalist(s)	3	0	0	3
9	Italy	1st place, gold medalist(s)		1st place, gold medalist(s)		3rd place, bronze medalist(s)	2	0	1	3
9	Norway	3rd place, bronze medalist(s)	1st place, gold medalist(s)		1st place, gold medalist(s)		2	0	1	3
11	Netherlands	3rd place, bronze medalist(s)		2nd place, silver medalist(s)	2nd place, silver medalist(s)		0	2	1	3
12	Chile	3rd place, bronze medalist(s)		3rd place, bronze medalist(s)		2nd place, silver medalist(s)	0	1	2	3
13	Canada	1st place, gold medalist(s)	1st place, gold medalist(s)				2	0	0	2
13	Mexico	1st place, gold medalist(s)				1st place, gold medalist(s)	2	0	0	2
13	Uruguay	1st place, gold medalist(s)		1st place, gold medalist(s)			2	0	0	2
16	Cameroon	1st place, gold medalist(s)				2nd place, silver medalist(s)	1	1	0	2
16	Czechoslovakia^{*}	1st place, gold medalist(s)		2nd place, silver medalist(s)			1	1	0	2
16	Denmark	2nd place, silver medalist(s)				1st place, gold medalist(s)	1	1	0	2
16	England^{†}			1st place, gold medalist(s)	2nd place, silver medalist(s)		1	1	0	2
16	Hungary	1st place, gold medalist(s)		2nd place, silver medalist(s)			1	1	0	2
21	Belgium	1st place, gold medalist(s)		3rd place, bronze medalist(s)			1	0	1	2
21	Poland	1st place, gold medalist(s)		3rd place, bronze medalist(s)			1	0	1	2
21	West Germany^{*}	3rd place, bronze medalist(s)		1st place, gold medalist(s)			1	0	1	2
24	China		2nd place, silver medalist(s)		2nd place, silver medalist(s)		0	2	0	2
25	Austria	2nd place, silver medalist(s)		3rd place, bronze medalist(s)			0	1	1	2
		Association football					Number of			
		Olympic Games		World Cup		Confederations Cup	Number of			
Rk.	Nation	Men	Women	Men	Women	Men	1st place, gold medalist(s)	2nd place, silver medalist(s)	3rd place, bronze medalist(s)	Total
26	Portugal			3rd place, bronze medalist(s)		3rd place, bronze medalist(s)	0	0	2	2
26	Turkey			3rd place, bronze medalist(s)		3rd place, bronze medalist(s)	0	0	2	2
28	East Germany^{*}	1st place, gold medalist(s)					1	0	0	1
28	Great Britain^{‡}	1st place, gold medalist(s)					1	0	0	1
28	Nigeria	1st place, gold medalist(s)					1	0	0	1
28	Soviet Union^{*}	1st place, gold medalist(s)					1	0	0	1
28	Yugoslavia^{*}	1st place, gold medalist(s)					1	0	0	1
33	Australia					2nd place, silver medalist(s)	0	1	0	1
33	Bulgaria	2nd place, silver medalist(s)					0	1	0	1
33	Croatia			2nd place, silver medalist(s)			0	1	0	1
33	Paraguay	2nd place, silver medalist(s)					0	1	0	1
33	Saudi Arabia					2nd place, silver medalist(s)	0	1	0	1
33	Switzerland	2nd place, silver medalist(s)					0	1	0	1
39	Czech Republic					3rd place, bronze medalist(s)	0	0	1	1
39	Ghana	3rd place, bronze medalist(s)					0	0	1	1
39	Morocco	3rd place, bronze medalist(s)					0	0	1	1
39	South Korea	3rd place, bronze medalist(s)					0	0	1	1
39	United Team of Germany^{*}	3rd place, bronze medalist(s)					0	0	1	1

^{*}Defunct National Olympic Committees (NOCs) or historical teams are shown in italic.
^{†}FIFA affiliates and non International Olympic Committee (IOC) members.
^{‡}International Olympic Committee (IOC) members and non FIFA affiliates.

==== Men ====
Last updated after the 2026 FIFA World Cup (As of 19 July 2026)
		Association football			Number of			
		Olympic Games	World Cup	Confederations Cup	Number of			
Rk.	Nation	Men	Men	Men	1st place, gold medalist(s)	2nd place, silver medalist(s)	3rd place, bronze medalist(s)	Total
1	Argentina	1st place, gold medalist(s)	1st place, gold medalist(s)	1st place, gold medalist(s)	3	0	0	3
1	Brazil	1st place, gold medalist(s)	1st place, gold medalist(s)	1st place, gold medalist(s)	3	0	0	3
1	France	1st place, gold medalist(s)	1st place, gold medalist(s)	1st place, gold medalist(s)	3	0	0	3
4	Germany	2nd place, silver medalist(s)	1st place, gold medalist(s)	1st place, gold medalist(s)	2	1	0	3
4	Spain	1st place, gold medalist(s)	1st place, gold medalist(s)	2nd place, silver medalist(s)	2	1	0	3
6	Italy	1st place, gold medalist(s)	1st place, gold medalist(s)	3rd place, bronze medalist(s)	2	0	1	3
7	United States	2nd place, silver medalist(s)	3rd place, bronze medalist(s)	2nd place, silver medalist(s)	0	2	1	3
8	Chile	3rd place, bronze medalist(s)	3rd place, bronze medalist(s)	2nd place, silver medalist(s)	0	1	2	3
9	Mexico	1st place, gold medalist(s)		1st place, gold medalist(s)	2	0	0	2
9	Uruguay	1st place, gold medalist(s)	1st place, gold medalist(s)		2	0	0	2
11	Cameroon	1st place, gold medalist(s)		2nd place, silver medalist(s)	1	1	0	2
11	Czechoslovakia^{*}	1st place, gold medalist(s)	2nd place, silver medalist(s)		1	1	0	2
11	Denmark	2nd place, silver medalist(s)		1st place, gold medalist(s)	1	1	0	2
11	Hungary	1st place, gold medalist(s)	2nd place, silver medalist(s)		1	1	0	2
11	Sweden	1st place, gold medalist(s)	2nd place, silver medalist(s)		1	1	0	2
16	Belgium	1st place, gold medalist(s)	3rd place, bronze medalist(s)		1	0	1	2
16	Poland	1st place, gold medalist(s)	3rd place, bronze medalist(s)		1	0	1	2
16	West Germany^{*}	3rd place, bronze medalist(s)	1st place, gold medalist(s)		1	0	1	2
19	Austria	2nd place, silver medalist(s)	3rd place, bronze medalist(s)		0	1	1	2
19	Japan	3rd place, bronze medalist(s)		2nd place, silver medalist(s)	0	1	1	2
19	Netherlands	3rd place, bronze medalist(s)	2nd place, silver medalist(s)		0	1	1	2
22	Portugal		3rd place, bronze medalist(s)	3rd place, bronze medalist(s)	0	0	2	2
22	Turkey		3rd place, bronze medalist(s)	3rd place, bronze medalist(s)	0	0	2	2
		Association football			Number of			
		Olympic Games	World Cup	Confederations Cup	Number of			
Rk.	Nation	Men	Men	Men	1st place, gold medalist(s)	2nd place, silver medalist(s)	3rd place, bronze medalist(s)	Total
24	Canada	1st place, gold medalist(s)			1	0	0	1
24	East Germany^{*}	1st place, gold medalist(s)			1	0	0	1
24	England^{†}		1st place, gold medalist(s)		1	0	0	1
24	Great Britain^{‡}	1st place, gold medalist(s)			1	0	0	1
24	Nigeria	1st place, gold medalist(s)			1	0	0	1
24	Soviet Union^{*}	1st place, gold medalist(s)			1	0	0	1
24	Yugoslavia^{*}	1st place, gold medalist(s)			1	0	0	1
31	Australia			2nd place, silver medalist(s)	0	1	0	1
31	Bulgaria	2nd place, silver medalist(s)			0	1	0	1
31	Croatia		2nd place, silver medalist(s)		0	1	0	1
31	Paraguay	2nd place, silver medalist(s)			0	1	0	1
31	Saudi Arabia			2nd place, silver medalist(s)	0	1	0	1
31	Switzerland	2nd place, silver medalist(s)			0	1	0	1
37	Czech Republic			3rd place, bronze medalist(s)	0	0	1	1
37	Ghana	3rd place, bronze medalist(s)			0	0	1	1
37	Morocco	3rd place, bronze medalist(s)			0	0	1	1
37	Norway	3rd place, bronze medalist(s)			0	0	1	1
37	South Korea	3rd place, bronze medalist(s)			0	0	1	1
37	United Team of Germany^{*}	3rd place, bronze medalist(s)			0	0	1	1

^{*}Defunct National Olympic Committees (NOCs) or historical teams are shown in italic.
^{†}FIFA affiliates and non International Olympic Committee (IOC) members.
^{‡}International Olympic Committee (IOC) members and non FIFA affiliates.

==== Women ====
Last updated after the 2024 Olympic Games (As of 10 August 2024)
		Association football		Number of			
		Olympic Games	World Cup	Number of			
Rk.	Nation	Women	Women	1st place, gold medalist(s)	2nd place, silver medalist(s)	3rd place, bronze medalist(s)	Total
1	Germany	1st place, gold medalist(s)	1st place, gold medalist(s)	2	0	0	2
1	Norway	1st place, gold medalist(s)	1st place, gold medalist(s)	2	0	0	2
1	United States	1st place, gold medalist(s)	1st place, gold medalist(s)	2	0	0	2
4	Japan	2nd place, silver medalist(s)	1st place, gold medalist(s)	1	1	0	2
5	Brazil	2nd place, silver medalist(s)	2nd place, silver medalist(s)	0	2	0	2
6	China	2nd place, silver medalist(s)	2nd place, silver medalist(s)	0	2	0	2
6	Sweden	2nd place, silver medalist(s)	2nd place, silver medalist(s)	0	2	0	2
8	Canada	1st place, gold medalist(s)		1	0	0	1
8	Spain		1st place, gold medalist(s)	1	0	0	1
10	England^{†}		2nd place, silver medalist(s)	0	1	0	1
10	Netherlands		2nd place, silver medalist(s)	0	1	0	1

^{†}FIFA affiliates and non International Olympic Committee (IOC) members.

=== Futsal ===
Last updated after the 2025 FIFA Futsal Women's World Cup (As of 7 December 2025)
		Futsal		Number of			
		World Cup		Number of			
Rk.	Nation	Men	Women	1st place, gold medalist(s)	2nd place, silver medalist(s)	3rd place, bronze medalist(s)	Total
1	Brazil	1st place, gold medalist(s)	1st place, gold medalist(s)	2	0	0	2
2	Portugal	1st place, gold medalist(s)	2nd place, silver medalist(s)	1	1	0	2
3	Spain	1st place, gold medalist(s)	3rd place, bronze medalist(s)	1	0	1	2
4	Argentina	1st place, gold medalist(s)		1	0	0	1
5	Italy	2nd place, silver medalist(s)		0	1	0	1
5	Netherlands	2nd place, silver medalist(s)		0	1	0	1
5	Russia	2nd place, silver medalist(s)		0	1	0	1
5	United States	2nd place, silver medalist(s)		0	1	0	1
9	Iran	3rd place, bronze medalist(s)		0	0	1	1
9	Ukraine	3rd place, bronze medalist(s)		0	0	1	1

=== Beach soccer ===
Last updated after the 2025 FIFA Beach Soccer World Cup (As of 11 May 2021)
		Beach soccer		Number of			
		World Cup		Number of			
Rk.	Nation	Men	Women	1st place, gold medalist(s)	2nd place, silver medalist(s)	3rd place, bronze medalist(s)	Total
1	Brazil	1st place, gold medalist(s)		1	0	0	1
1	France	1st place, gold medalist(s)		1	0	0	1
1	Portugal	1st place, gold medalist(s)		1	0	0	1
1	Russia	1st place, gold medalist(s)		1	0	0	1
5	Belarus	2nd place, silver medalist(s)		0	1	0	1
5	Italy	2nd place, silver medalist(s)		0	1	0	1
5	Japan	2nd place, silver medalist(s)		0	1	0	1
5	Mexico	2nd place, silver medalist(s)		0	1	0	1
5	Peru	2nd place, silver medalist(s)		0	1	0	1
5	Spain	2nd place, silver medalist(s)		0	1	0	1
5	Switzerland	2nd place, silver medalist(s)		0	1	0	1
5	Tahiti^{†}	2nd place, silver medalist(s)		0	1	0	1
5	United States	2nd place, silver medalist(s)		0	1	0	1
5	Uruguay	2nd place, silver medalist(s)		0	1	0	1
15	Argentina	3rd place, bronze medalist(s)		0	0	1	1
15	England^{†}	3rd place, bronze medalist(s)		0	0	1	1
15	Iran	3rd place, bronze medalist(s)		0	0	1	1

^{†}FIFA affiliates and non International Olympic Committee (IOC) members.

== See also ==
- List of major achievements in sports by nation
- FIFA Women's World Rankings
- FIFA World Rankings
