= Major achievements in ice hockey by nation =

This article contains lists of achievements in major senior-level international ice hockey and Para ice hockey tournaments according to first-place, second-place and third-place results obtained by teams representing different nations. The objective is not to create combined medal tables; the focus is on listing the best positions achieved by teams in major international tournaments, ranking the nations according to the most number of podiums accomplished by teams of these nations.

== Results ==
For the making of these lists, results from following major international tournaments were consulted:

Form	Governing body	Tournament	Edition		
Form	Governing body	Tournament	First	Latest	Next
Ice hockey	IIHF & IOC	Ice hockey at the Olympic Games (quadrennially)	1920	2026	2030
Ice hockey	IIHF	Men's World Ice Hockey Championships (annually)	1920	2026	2027
Ice hockey	IIHF	Women's Ice Hockey World Championships (annually)	1990	2026	2027
Para ice hockey	IPC	Para ice hockey at the Winter Paralympics (quadrennially)	1994	2026	2030
Para ice hockey	IPC	World Para Ice Hockey Championships (Note: formerly IPC Ice Sledge Hockey World Championships) (biennially)	1996	2025	2027

- IIHF: International Ice Hockey Federation
- IOC: International Olympic Committee
- IPC: International Paralympic Committee

Medals earned by athletes from defunct National Olympic Committees (NOCs) and National Paralympic Committees (NPCs) or historical teams are NOT merged with the results achieved by their immediate successor states. The International Olympic Committee (IOC) and International Paralympic Committee (IPC) do NOT combine medals of these nations or teams.

The tables are pre-sorted by total number of first-place results, second-place results and third-place results, respectively. When equal ranks are given, nations are listed in alphabetical order.

=== Ice hockey and Para ice hockey ===
Last updated after the 2026 IIHF Men's World Championship (As of 31 May 2026)
		Ice hockey				Para ice hockey		Number of			
		Olympic Games		World Championships		Paralympic Games	World Championships	Number of			
Rk.	Nation	Men	Women	Men	Women	Mixed	Mixed	1st place, gold medalist(s)	2nd place, silver medalist(s)	3rd place, bronze medalist(s)	Total
1	Canada	1st place, gold medalist(s)	1st place, gold medalist(s)	1st place, gold medalist(s)	1st place, gold medalist(s)	1st place, gold medalist(s)	1st place, gold medalist(s)	6	0	0	6
1	United States	1st place, gold medalist(s)	1st place, gold medalist(s)	1st place, gold medalist(s)	1st place, gold medalist(s)	1st place, gold medalist(s)	1st place, gold medalist(s)	6	0	0	6
3	Sweden	1st place, gold medalist(s)	2nd place, silver medalist(s)	1st place, gold medalist(s)	3rd place, bronze medalist(s)	1st place, gold medalist(s)	1st place, gold medalist(s)	4	1	1	6
4	Russia	2nd place, silver medalist(s)		1st place, gold medalist(s)	3rd place, bronze medalist(s)	2nd place, silver medalist(s)	3rd place, bronze medalist(s)	1	2	2	5
5	Finland	1st place, gold medalist(s)	3rd place, bronze medalist(s)	1st place, gold medalist(s)	2nd place, silver medalist(s)			2	1	1	4
6	Czech Republic	1st place, gold medalist(s)		1st place, gold medalist(s)	3rd place, bronze medalist(s)		3rd place, bronze medalist(s)	2	0	2	4
7	Switzerland	3rd place, bronze medalist(s)	3rd place, bronze medalist(s)	2nd place, silver medalist(s)	3rd place, bronze medalist(s)			0	1	3	4
8	Norway			3rd place, bronze medalist(s)		1st place, gold medalist(s)	1st place, gold medalist(s)	2	0	1	3
9	Great Britain	1st place, gold medalist(s)		1st place, gold medalist(s)				2	0	0	2
9	Soviet Union^{*}	1st place, gold medalist(s)		1st place, gold medalist(s)				2	0	0	2
11	Czechoslovakia^{*}	2nd place, silver medalist(s)		1st place, gold medalist(s)				1	1	0	2
12	Slovakia	3rd place, bronze medalist(s)		1st place, gold medalist(s)				1	0	1	2
13	Germany	2nd place, silver medalist(s)		2nd place, silver medalist(s)				0	2	0	2
14	South Korea					3rd place, bronze medalist(s)	2nd place, silver medalist(s)	0	1	1	2
14	West Germany^{*}	3rd place, bronze medalist(s)		2nd place, silver medalist(s)				0	1	1	2
16	Olympic Athletes from Russia^{*}	1st place, gold medalist(s)						1	0	0	1
16	Unified Team^{*}	1st place, gold medalist(s)						1	0	0	1
18	Japan					2nd place, silver medalist(s)		0	1	0	1
18	ROC^{*}	2nd place, silver medalist(s)						0	1	0	1
20	Austria			3rd place, bronze medalist(s)				0	0	1	1
20	China					3rd place, bronze medalist(s)		0	0	1	1
20	Latvia			3rd place, bronze medalist(s)				0	0	1	1

^{*}Defunct National Olympic Committees (NOCs) and National Paralympic Committees (NPCs) or historical teams are shown in italic.

=== Ice hockey ===
==== Men and women ====
Last updated after the 2026 IIHF Men's World Championship (As of 31 May 2026)
		Ice hockey				Number of			
		Olympic Games		World Championships		Number of			
Rk.	Nation	Men	Women	Men	Women	1st place, gold medalist(s)	2nd place, silver medalist(s)	3rd place, bronze medalist(s)	Total
1	Canada	1st place, gold medalist(s)	1st place, gold medalist(s)	1st place, gold medalist(s)	1st place, gold medalist(s)	4	0	0	4
1	United States	1st place, gold medalist(s)	1st place, gold medalist(s)	1st place, gold medalist(s)	1st place, gold medalist(s)	4	0	0	4
3	Sweden	1st place, gold medalist(s)	2nd place, silver medalist(s)	1st place, gold medalist(s)	3rd place, bronze medalist(s)	2	1	1	4
3	Finland	1st place, gold medalist(s)	3rd place, bronze medalist(s)	1st place, gold medalist(s)	2nd place, silver medalist(s)	2	1	1	4
5	Switzerland	3rd place, bronze medalist(s)	3rd place, bronze medalist(s)	2nd place, silver medalist(s)	3rd place, bronze medalist(s)	0	1	3	4
6	Czech Republic	1st place, gold medalist(s)		1st place, gold medalist(s)	3rd place, bronze medalist(s)	2	0	1	3
7	Russia	2nd place, silver medalist(s)		1st place, gold medalist(s)	3rd place, bronze medalist(s)	1	1	1	3
8	Great Britain	1st place, gold medalist(s)		1st place, gold medalist(s)		2	0	0	2
8	Soviet Union^{*}	1st place, gold medalist(s)		1st place, gold medalist(s)		2	0	0	2
10	Czechoslovakia^{*}	2nd place, silver medalist(s)		1st place, gold medalist(s)		1	1	0	2
11	Slovakia	3rd place, bronze medalist(s)		1st place, gold medalist(s)		1	0	1	2
12	Germany	2nd place, silver medalist(s)		2nd place, silver medalist(s)		0	2	0	2
13	West Germany^{*}	3rd place, bronze medalist(s)		2nd place, silver medalist(s)		0	1	1	2
14	Olympic Athletes from Russia^{*}	1st place, gold medalist(s)				1	0	0	1
14	Unified Team^{*}	1st place, gold medalist(s)				1	0	0	1
16	Austria			3rd place, bronze medalist(s)		0	0	1	1
16	Latvia			3rd place, bronze medalist(s)		0	0	1	1
16	Norway			3rd place, bronze medalist(s)		0	0	1	1

^{*}Defunct National Olympic Committees (NOCs) or historical teams are shown in italic.

==== Men ====
Last updated after the 2026 IIHF Men's World Championship (As of 31 May 2026)
		Ice hockey		Number of			
		Olympic Games	World Championships	Number of			
Rk.	Nation	Men	Men	1st place, gold medalist(s)	2nd place, silver medalist(s)	3rd place, bronze medalist(s)	Total
1	Canada	1st place, gold medalist(s)	1st place, gold medalist(s)	2	0	0	2
1	Czech Republic	1st place, gold medalist(s)	1st place, gold medalist(s)	2	0	0	2
1	Finland	1st place, gold medalist(s)	1st place, gold medalist(s)	2	0	0	2
1	Great Britain	1st place, gold medalist(s)	1st place, gold medalist(s)	2	0	0	2
1	Soviet Union^{*}	1st place, gold medalist(s)	1st place, gold medalist(s)	2	0	0	2
1	Sweden	1st place, gold medalist(s)	1st place, gold medalist(s)	2	0	0	2
1	United States	1st place, gold medalist(s)	1st place, gold medalist(s)	2	0	0	2
8	Czechoslovakia^{*}	2nd place, silver medalist(s)	1st place, gold medalist(s)	1	1	0	2
8	Russia	2nd place, silver medalist(s)	1st place, gold medalist(s)	1	1	0	2
10	Slovakia	3rd place, bronze medalist(s)	1st place, gold medalist(s)	1	0	1	2
11	Germany	2nd place, silver medalist(s)	2nd place, silver medalist(s)	0	2	0	2
12	Switzerland	3rd place, bronze medalist(s)	2nd place, silver medalist(s)	0	1	1	2
12	West Germany^{*}	3rd place, bronze medalist(s)	2nd place, silver medalist(s)	0	1	1	2
14	Olympic Athletes from Russia^{*}	1st place, gold medalist(s)		1	0	0	1
14	Unified Team^{*}	1st place, gold medalist(s)		1	0	0	1
16	Austria		3rd place, bronze medalist(s)	0	0	1	1
16	Latvia		3rd place, bronze medalist(s)	0	0	1	1
16	Norway		3rd place, bronze medalist(s)	0	0	1	1

^{*}Defunct National Olympic Committees (NOCs) or historical teams are shown in italic.

==== Women ====
Last updated after the 2026 Winter Olympics (As of 19 February 2026)
		Ice hockey		Number of			
		Olympic Games	World Championships	Number of			
Rk.	Nation	Women	Women	1st place, gold medalist(s)	2nd place, silver medalist(s)	3rd place, bronze medalist(s)	Total
1	Canada	1st place, gold medalist(s)	1st place, gold medalist(s)	2	0	0	2
1	United States	1st place, gold medalist(s)	1st place, gold medalist(s)	2	0	0	2
3	Finland	3rd place, bronze medalist(s)	2nd place, silver medalist(s)	0	1	1	2
3	Sweden	2nd place, silver medalist(s)	3rd place, bronze medalist(s)	0	1	1	2
5	Switzerland	3rd place, bronze medalist(s)	3rd place, bronze medalist(s)	0	0	2	2
6	Czech Republic		3rd place, bronze medalist(s)	0	0	1	1
6	Russia		3rd place, bronze medalist(s)	0	0	1	1

=== Para ice hockey ===
Last updated after the 2026 Winter Paralympics (As of 15 March 2026)
		Para ice hockey		Number of			
		Paralympic Games	World Championships	Number of			
Rk.	Nation	Mixed	Mixed	1st place, gold medalist(s)	2nd place, silver medalist(s)	3rd place, bronze medalist(s)	Total
1	Canada	1st place, gold medalist(s)	1st place, gold medalist(s)	2	0	0	2
1	Norway	1st place, gold medalist(s)	1st place, gold medalist(s)	2	0	0	2
1	Sweden	1st place, gold medalist(s)	1st place, gold medalist(s)	2	0	0	2
1	United States	1st place, gold medalist(s)	1st place, gold medalist(s)	2	0	0	2
5	Russia	2nd place, silver medalist(s)	3rd place, bronze medalist(s)	0	1	1	2
5	South Korea	3rd place, bronze medalist(s)	2nd place, silver medalist(s)	0	1	1	2
7	Japan	2nd place, silver medalist(s)		0	1	0	1
8	Czech Republic		3rd place, bronze medalist(s)	0	0	1	1
8	China	3rd place, bronze medalist(s)		0	0	1	1

== See also ==
- IIHF World Ranking
- List of major achievements in sports by nation
