= Major achievements in basketball by nation =

This article contains lists of achievements in major senior-level international basketball, 3x3 basketball and wheelchair basketball tournaments according to first-place, second-place and third-place results obtained by teams representing different nations. The objective is not to create combined medal tables; the focus is on listing the best positions achieved by teams in major international tournaments, ranking the nations according to the most podiums accomplished by teams of these nations.

== Results ==
For the making of these lists, results from following major international tournaments were consulted:

Form	Governing body	Tournament	Edition		
Form	Governing body	Tournament	First	Latest	Next
Basketball	FIBA & IOC	Basketball at the Summer Olympics (quadrennially)	1936	2024	2028
Basketball	FIBA	FIBA Basketball World Cup (Note: formerly FIBA World Championship) (quadrennially)	1950	2023	2027
Basketball	FIBA	FIBA Women's Basketball World Cup (Note: formerly FIBA World Championship for Women) (quadrennially)	1953	2022	2026
3x3 basketball	FIBA & IOC	3x3 basketball at the Summer Olympics (quadrennially)	2020	2024	2028
3x3 basketball	FIBA	FIBA 3x3 World Cup (Note: formerly FIBA 3x3 World Championship) (annually)	2012	2026	2027
Wheelchair basketball	IWBF & IPC	Wheelchair basketball at the Summer Paralympics (quadrennially)	1960	2024	2028
Wheelchair basketball	IWBF	IWBF Wheelchair Basketball World Championship (quadrennially)	1973	2023	2026

- FIBA: International Basketball Federation
- IOC: International Olympic Committee
- IPC: International Paralympic Committee
- IWBF: International Wheelchair Basketball Federation

Medals for the demonstration events are NOT counted. Medals earned by athletes from defunct National Olympic Committees (NOCs) and National Paralympic Committees (NPCs) or historical teams are NOT merged with the results achieved by their immediate successor states. The International Olympic Committee (IOC) and International Paralympic Committee (IPC) do NOT combine medals of these nations or teams.

The tables are pre-sorted by total number of first-place results, second-place results and third-place results, then most first-place results, second-place results, respectively. When equal ranks are given, nations are listed in alphabetical order.

=== Basketball, 3x3 basketball and wheelchair basketball ===
==== Men and women ====
Last updated after the 2026 FIBA 3x3 World Cup (As of 7 June 2026)
		Basketball				3x3 basketball				Wheelchair basketball				Number of			
		Olympic Games		World Cup		Olympic Games		World Cup		Paralympic Games		World Championship		Number of			
Rk.	Nation	Men	Women	Men	Women	Men	Women	Men	Women	Men	Women	Men	Women	1st place, gold medalist(s)	2nd place, silver medalist(s)	3rd place, bronze medalist(s)	Total
1	United States	1st place, gold medalist(s)	1st place, gold medalist(s)	1st place, gold medalist(s)	1st place, gold medalist(s)		1st place, gold medalist(s)	1st place, gold medalist(s)	1st place, gold medalist(s)	1st place, gold medalist(s)	1st place, gold medalist(s)	1st place, gold medalist(s)	1st place, gold medalist(s)	11	0	0	11
2	France	2nd place, silver medalist(s)	2nd place, silver medalist(s)	3rd place, bronze medalist(s)	3rd place, bronze medalist(s)	2nd place, silver medalist(s)		2nd place, silver medalist(s)	1st place, gold medalist(s)	1st place, gold medalist(s)		1st place, gold medalist(s)		3	4	2	9
3	Canada	2nd place, silver medalist(s)		3rd place, bronze medalist(s)	3rd place, bronze medalist(s)				2nd place, silver medalist(s)	1st place, gold medalist(s)	1st place, gold medalist(s)	1st place, gold medalist(s)	1st place, gold medalist(s)	4	2	2	8
4	Australia	3rd place, bronze medalist(s)	2nd place, silver medalist(s)		1st place, gold medalist(s)				2nd place, silver medalist(s)	1st place, gold medalist(s)	2nd place, silver medalist(s)	1st place, gold medalist(s)	3rd place, bronze medalist(s)	3	3	2	8
5	Netherlands					1st place, gold medalist(s)		2nd place, silver medalist(s)	1st place, gold medalist(s)	1st place, gold medalist(s)	1st place, gold medalist(s)	2nd place, silver medalist(s)	1st place, gold medalist(s)	5	2	0	7
6	Spain	2nd place, silver medalist(s)	2nd place, silver medalist(s)	1st place, gold medalist(s)	2nd place, silver medalist(s)		2nd place, silver medalist(s)	1st place, gold medalist(s)		2nd place, silver medalist(s)				2	5	0	7
7	Germany			1st place, gold medalist(s)			1st place, gold medalist(s)	2nd place, silver medalist(s)		2nd place, silver medalist(s)	1st place, gold medalist(s)		2nd place, silver medalist(s)	3	3	0	6
8	China		2nd place, silver medalist(s)		2nd place, silver medalist(s)		3rd place, bronze medalist(s)		1st place, gold medalist(s)		2nd place, silver medalist(s)		2nd place, silver medalist(s)	1	4	1	6
9	Russia	3rd place, bronze medalist(s)	3rd place, bronze medalist(s)	2nd place, silver medalist(s)	2nd place, silver medalist(s)			3rd place, bronze medalist(s)	1st place, gold medalist(s)					1	2	3	6
10	Serbia	2nd place, silver medalist(s)	3rd place, bronze medalist(s)	2nd place, silver medalist(s)		3rd place, bronze medalist(s)		1st place, gold medalist(s)						1	2	2	5
11	Soviet Union^{*}	1st place, gold medalist(s)	1st place, gold medalist(s)	1st place, gold medalist(s)	1st place, gold medalist(s)									4	0	0	4
12	Argentina	1st place, gold medalist(s)		1st place, gold medalist(s)						2nd place, silver medalist(s)	1st place, gold medalist(s)			3	1	0	4
13	Yugoslavia^{*}	1st place, gold medalist(s)	2nd place, silver medalist(s)	1st place, gold medalist(s)	2nd place, silver medalist(s)									2	2	0	4
14	Brazil	3rd place, bronze medalist(s)	2nd place, silver medalist(s)	1st place, gold medalist(s)	1st place, gold medalist(s)									2	1	1	4
15	Lithuania	3rd place, bronze medalist(s)		3rd place, bronze medalist(s)		3rd place, bronze medalist(s)		2nd place, silver medalist(s)						0	1	3	4
16	Israel									1st place, gold medalist(s)	1st place, gold medalist(s)	1st place, gold medalist(s)		3	0	0	3
17	Japan		2nd place, silver medalist(s)		2nd place, silver medalist(s)					2nd place, silver medalist(s)				0	3	0	3
18	United Kingdom									2nd place, silver medalist(s)		1st place, gold medalist(s)	2nd place, silver medalist(s)	1	2	0	3
19	Latvia					1st place, gold medalist(s)		1st place, gold medalist(s)						2	0	0	2
20	Czech Republic				2nd place, silver medalist(s)				1st place, gold medalist(s)					1	1	0	2
20	Italy	2nd place, silver medalist(s)							1st place, gold medalist(s)					1	1	0	2
20	Serbia and Montenegro^{*}	2nd place, silver medalist(s)		1st place, gold medalist(s)										1	1	0	2
		Basketball				3x3 basketball				Wheelchair basketball				Number of			
		Olympic Games		World Cup		Olympic Games		World Cup		Paralympic Games		World Championship		Number of			
Rk.	Nation	Men	Women	Men	Women	Men	Women	Men	Women	Men	Women	Men	Women	1st place, gold medalist(s)	2nd place, silver medalist(s)	3rd place, bronze medalist(s)	Total
23	Bulgaria		2nd place, silver medalist(s)		2nd place, silver medalist(s)									0	2	0	2
23	ROC^{*}					2nd place, silver medalist(s)	2nd place, silver medalist(s)							0	2	0	2
23	South Korea		2nd place, silver medalist(s)		2nd place, silver medalist(s)									0	2	0	2
26	Chile			3rd place, bronze medalist(s)	2nd place, silver medalist(s)									0	1	1	2
26	Croatia	2nd place, silver medalist(s)		3rd place, bronze medalist(s)										0	1	1	2
26	Turkey			2nd place, silver medalist(s)								3rd place, bronze medalist(s)		0	1	1	2
26	Ukraine							3rd place, bronze medalist(s)	2nd place, silver medalist(s)					0	1	1	2
30	Cuba	3rd place, bronze medalist(s)			3rd place, bronze medalist(s)									0	0	2	2
30	Sweden									3rd place, bronze medalist(s)		3rd place, bronze medalist(s)		0	0	2	2
32	Qatar							1st place, gold medalist(s)						1	0	0	1
32	Unified Team^{*}		1st place, gold medalist(s)											1	0	0	1
32	West Germany^{*}										1st place, gold medalist(s)			1	0	0	1
35	Czechoslovakia^{*}				2nd place, silver medalist(s)									0	1	0	1
35	Greece			2nd place, silver medalist(s)										0	1	0	1
35	Hungary								2nd place, silver medalist(s)					0	1	0	1
35	Jamaica										2nd place, silver medalist(s)			0	1	0	1
35	Mongolia								2nd place, silver medalist(s)					0	1	0	1
35	Switzerland							2nd place, silver medalist(s)						0	1	0	1
41	Belgium								3rd place, bronze medalist(s)					0	0	1	1
41	Iran											3rd place, bronze medalist(s)		0	0	1	1
41	Mexico	3rd place, bronze medalist(s)												0	0	1	1
41	Philippines			3rd place, bronze medalist(s)										0	0	1	1
41	Poland							3rd place, bronze medalist(s)						0	0	1	1
41	Slovenia							3rd place, bronze medalist(s)						0	0	1	1
41	Uruguay	3rd place, bronze medalist(s)												0	0	1	1

^{*}Defunct National Olympic Committees (NOCs) and National Paralympic Committees (NPCs) or historical teams are shown in italic.

==== Men ====
Last updated after the 2026 FIBA 3x3 World Cup (As of 7 June 2026)
		Basketball		3x3 basketball		Wheelchair basketball		Number of			
		Olympic Games	World Cup	Olympic Games	World Cup	Paralympic Games	World Championship	Number of			
Rk.	Nation	Men	Men	Men	Men	Men	Men	1st place, gold medalist(s)	2nd place, silver medalist(s)	3rd place, bronze medalist(s)	Total
1	France	2nd place, silver medalist(s)	3rd place, bronze medalist(s)	2nd place, silver medalist(s)	2nd place, silver medalist(s)	1st place, gold medalist(s)	1st place, gold medalist(s)	2	3	1	6
2	United States	1st place, gold medalist(s)	1st place, gold medalist(s)		1st place, gold medalist(s)	1st place, gold medalist(s)	1st place, gold medalist(s)	5	0	0	5
3	Netherlands			1st place, gold medalist(s)	2nd place, silver medalist(s)	1st place, gold medalist(s)	2nd place, silver medalist(s)	2	2	0	4
3	Spain	2nd place, silver medalist(s)	1st place, gold medalist(s)		1st place, gold medalist(s)	2nd place, silver medalist(s)		2	2	0	4
5	Canada	2nd place, silver medalist(s)	3rd place, bronze medalist(s)			1st place, gold medalist(s)	1st place, gold medalist(s)	2	1	1	4
6	Serbia	2nd place, silver medalist(s)	2nd place, silver medalist(s)	3rd place, bronze medalist(s)	1st place, gold medalist(s)			1	2	1	4
7	Russia	3rd place, bronze medalist(s)	2nd place, silver medalist(s)	2nd place, silver medalist(s)	3rd place, bronze medalist(s)			0	2	2	4
8	Lithuania	3rd place, bronze medalist(s)	3rd place, bronze medalist(s)	3rd place, bronze medalist(s)	2nd place, silver medalist(s)			0	1	3	4
9	Argentina	1st place, gold medalist(s)	1st place, gold medalist(s)			2nd place, silver medalist(s)		2	1	0	3
10	Australia	3rd place, bronze medalist(s)				1st place, gold medalist(s)	1st place, gold medalist(s)	2	0	1	3
11	Germany		1st place, gold medalist(s)		2nd place, silver medalist(s)	2nd place, silver medalist(s)		1	2	0	3
12	Israel					1st place, gold medalist(s)	1st place, gold medalist(s)	2	0	0	2
12	Latvia			1st place, gold medalist(s)	1st place, gold medalist(s)			2	0	0	2
12	Soviet Union^{*}	1st place, gold medalist(s)	1st place, gold medalist(s)					2	0	0	2
12	Yugoslavia^{*}	1st place, gold medalist(s)	1st place, gold medalist(s)					2	0	0	2
16	Great Britain					2nd place, silver medalist(s)	1st place, gold medalist(s)	1	1	0	2
16	Serbia and Montenegro^{*}	2nd place, silver medalist(s)	1st place, gold medalist(s)					1	1	0	2
18	Brazil	3rd place, bronze medalist(s)	1st place, gold medalist(s)					1	0	1	2
19	Croatia	2nd place, silver medalist(s)	3rd place, bronze medalist(s)					0	1	1	2
19	Turkey		2nd place, silver medalist(s)				3rd place, bronze medalist(s)	0	1	1	2
21	Sweden					3rd place, bronze medalist(s)	3rd place, bronze medalist(s)	0	0	2	2
22	Qatar				1st place, gold medalist(s)			1	0	0	1
23	Greece		2nd place, silver medalist(s)					0	1	0	1
23	Italy	2nd place, silver medalist(s)						0	1	0	1
23	Japan					2nd place, silver medalist(s)		0	1	0	1
23	Switzerland				2nd place, silver medalist(s)			0	1	0	1
27	Chile		3rd place, bronze medalist(s)					0	0	1	1
27	Cuba	3rd place, bronze medalist(s)						0	0	1	1
27	Iran						3rd place, bronze medalist(s)	0	0	1	1
27	Mexico	3rd place, bronze medalist(s)						0	0	1	1
27	Philippines		3rd place, bronze medalist(s)					0	0	1	1
27	Poland				3rd place, bronze medalist(s)			0	0	1	1
27	Slovenia				3rd place, bronze medalist(s)			0	0	1	1
27	Ukraine				3rd place, bronze medalist(s)			0	0	1	1
27	Uruguay	3rd place, bronze medalist(s)						0	0	1	1

^{*}Defunct National Olympic Committees (NOCs) and National Paralympic Committees (NPCs) or historical teams are shown in italic.

==== Women ====
Last updated after the 2026 FIBA 3x3 World Cup (As of 7 June 2026)
		Basketball		3x3 basketball		Wheelchair basketball		Number of			
		Olympic Games	World Cup	Olympic Games	World Cup	Paralympic Games	World Championship	Number of			
Rk.	Nation	Women	Women	Women	Women	Women	Women	1st place, gold medalist(s)	2nd place, silver medalist(s)	3rd place, bronze medalist(s)	Total
1	United States	1st place, gold medalist(s)	1st place, gold medalist(s)	1st place, gold medalist(s)	1st place, gold medalist(s)	1st place, gold medalist(s)	1st place, gold medalist(s)	6	0	0	6
2	China	2nd place, silver medalist(s)	2nd place, silver medalist(s)	3rd place, bronze medalist(s)	1st place, gold medalist(s)	2nd place, silver medalist(s)	2nd place, silver medalist(s)	1	4	1	6
3	Australia	2nd place, silver medalist(s)	1st place, gold medalist(s)		2nd place, silver medalist(s)	2nd place, silver medalist(s)	3rd place, bronze medalist(s)	1	3	1	5
4	Canada		3rd place, bronze medalist(s)		2nd place, silver medalist(s)	1st place, gold medalist(s)	1st place, gold medalist(s)	2	1	1	4
5	Russia	3rd place, bronze medalist(s)	2nd place, silver medalist(s)	2nd place, silver medalist(s)	1st place, gold medalist(s)			1	2	1	4
6	Netherlands				1st place, gold medalist(s)	1st place, gold medalist(s)	1st place, gold medalist(s)	3	0	0	3
7	Germany			1st place, gold medalist(s)		1st place, gold medalist(s)	2nd place, silver medalist(s)	2	1	0	3
8	France	2nd place, silver medalist(s)	3rd place, bronze medalist(s)		1st place, gold medalist(s)			1	1	1	3
9	Spain	2nd place, silver medalist(s)	2nd place, silver medalist(s)	2nd place, silver medalist(s)				0	3	0	3
10	Japan	2nd place, silver medalist(s)	2nd place, silver medalist(s)			3rd place, bronze medalist(s)		0	2	1	3
11	Soviet Union^{*}	1st place, gold medalist(s)	1st place, gold medalist(s)					2	0	0	2
12	Brazil	2nd place, silver medalist(s)	1st place, gold medalist(s)					1	1	0	2
12	Czech Republic		2nd place, silver medalist(s)		1st place, gold medalist(s)			1	1	0	2
14	Bulgaria	2nd place, silver medalist(s)	2nd place, silver medalist(s)					0	2	0	2
14	South Korea	2nd place, silver medalist(s)	2nd place, silver medalist(s)					0	2	0	2
14	Yugoslavia^{*}	2nd place, silver medalist(s)	2nd place, silver medalist(s)					0	2	0	2
17	Argentina					1st place, gold medalist(s)		1	0	0	1
17	Israel					1st place, gold medalist(s)		1	0	0	1
17	Italy				1st place, gold medalist(s)			1	0	0	1
17	Unified Team^{*}	1st place, gold medalist(s)						1	0	0	1
17	West Germany^{*}					1st place, gold medalist(s)		1	0	0	1
22	Chile		2nd place, silver medalist(s)					0	1	0	1
22	Czechoslovakia^{*}		2nd place, silver medalist(s)					0	1	0	1
22	Great Britain						2nd place, silver medalist(s)	0	1	0	1
22	Hungary				2nd place, silver medalist(s)			0	1	0	1
22	Jamaica					2nd place, silver medalist(s)		0	1	0	1
22	Mongolia				2nd place, silver medalist(s)			0	1	0	1
22	Ukraine				2nd place, silver medalist(s)			0	1	0	1
29	Belgium				3rd place, bronze medalist(s)			0	0	1	1
29	Cuba		3rd place, bronze medalist(s)					0	0	1	1
29	Serbia	3rd place, bronze medalist(s)						0	0	1	1

^{*}Defunct National Olympic Committees (NOCs) and National Paralympic Committees (NPCs) or historical teams are shown in italic.

=== Basketball and 3x3 basketball ===
==== Men and women ====
Last updated after the 2026 FIBA 3x3 World Cup (As of 7 June 2026)
		Basketball				3x3 basketball				Number of			
		Olympic Games		World Cup		Olympic Games		World Cup		Number of			
Rk.	Nation	Men	Women	Men	Women	Men	Women	Men	Women	1st place, gold medalist(s)	2nd place, silver medalist(s)	3rd place, bronze medalist(s)	Total
1	Russia	3rd place, bronze medalist(s)	3rd place, bronze medalist(s)	2nd place, silver medalist(s)	2nd place, silver medalist(s)	2nd place, silver medalist(s)	2nd place, silver medalist(s)	3rd place, bronze medalist(s)	1st place, gold medalist(s)	1	4	3	8
2	United States	1st place, gold medalist(s)	1st place, gold medalist(s)	1st place, gold medalist(s)	1st place, gold medalist(s)		1st place, gold medalist(s)	1st place, gold medalist(s)	1st place, gold medalist(s)	7	0	0	7
3	France	2nd place, silver medalist(s)	2nd place, silver medalist(s)	3rd place, bronze medalist(s)	3rd place, bronze medalist(s)	2nd place, silver medalist(s)		2nd place, silver medalist(s)	1st place, gold medalist(s)	1	4	2	7
4	Spain	2nd place, silver medalist(s)	2nd place, silver medalist(s)	1st place, gold medalist(s)	2nd place, silver medalist(s)		2nd place, silver medalist(s)	1st place, gold medalist(s)		2	4	0	6
5	Serbia	2nd place, silver medalist(s)	3rd place, bronze medalist(s)	2nd place, silver medalist(s)		3rd place, bronze medalist(s)		1st place, gold medalist(s)		1	2	2	5
6	Soviet Union^{*}	1st place, gold medalist(s)	1st place, gold medalist(s)	1st place, gold medalist(s)	1st place, gold medalist(s)					4	0	0	4
7	Yugoslavia^{*}	1st place, gold medalist(s)	2nd place, silver medalist(s)	1st place, gold medalist(s)	2nd place, silver medalist(s)					2	2	0	4
8	Brazil	3rd place, bronze medalist(s)	2nd place, silver medalist(s)	1st place, gold medalist(s)	1st place, gold medalist(s)					2	1	1	4
9	Australia	3rd place, bronze medalist(s)	2nd place, silver medalist(s)		1st place, gold medalist(s)				2nd place, silver medalist(s)	1	2	1	4
9	China		2nd place, silver medalist(s)		2nd place, silver medalist(s)		3rd place, bronze medalist(s)		1st place, gold medalist(s)	1	2	1	4
11	Canada	2nd place, silver medalist(s)		3rd place, bronze medalist(s)	3rd place, bronze medalist(s)				2nd place, silver medalist(s)	0	2	2	4
12	Lithuania	3rd place, bronze medalist(s)		3rd place, bronze medalist(s)		3rd place, bronze medalist(s)		2nd place, silver medalist(s)		0	1	3	4
13	Germany			1st place, gold medalist(s)			1st place, gold medalist(s)	2nd place, silver medalist(s)		2	1	0	3
14	Netherlands					1st place, gold medalist(s)		2nd place, silver medalist(s)	1st place, gold medalist(s)	2	1	0	3
15	Argentina	1st place, gold medalist(s)		1st place, gold medalist(s)						2	0	0	2
15	Latvia					1st place, gold medalist(s)		1st place, gold medalist(s)		2	0	0	2
17	Czech Republic				2nd place, silver medalist(s)				1st place, gold medalist(s)	1	1	0	2
17	Italy	2nd place, silver medalist(s)							1st place, gold medalist(s)	1	1	0	2
17	Serbia and Montenegro^{*}	2nd place, silver medalist(s)		1st place, gold medalist(s)						1	1	0	2
20	Bulgaria		2nd place, silver medalist(s)		2nd place, silver medalist(s)					0	2	0	2
20	Japan		2nd place, silver medalist(s)		2nd place, silver medalist(s)					0	2	0	2
20	South Korea		2nd place, silver medalist(s)		2nd place, silver medalist(s)					0	2	0	2
23	Chile			3rd place, bronze medalist(s)	2nd place, silver medalist(s)					0	1	1	2
23	Croatia	2nd place, silver medalist(s)		3rd place, bronze medalist(s)						0	1	1	2
23	Ukraine							3rd place, bronze medalist(s)	2nd place, silver medalist(s)	0	1	1	2
26	Cuba	3rd place, bronze medalist(s)			3rd place, bronze medalist(s)					0	0	2	2
		Basketball				3x3 basketball				Number of			
		Olympic Games		World Cup		Olympic Games		World Cup		Number of			
Rk.	Nation	Men	Women	Men	Women	Men	Women	Men	Women	1st place, gold medalist(s)	2nd place, silver medalist(s)	3rd place, bronze medalist(s)	Total
27	Qatar							1st place, gold medalist(s)		1	0	0	1
27	Unified Team^{*}		1st place, gold medalist(s)							1	0	0	1
29	Czechoslovakia^{*}				2nd place, silver medalist(s)					0	1	0	1
29	Greece			2nd place, silver medalist(s)						0	1	0	1
29	Hungary								2nd place, silver medalist(s)	0	1	0	1
29	Mongolia								2nd place, silver medalist(s)	0	1	0	1
29	Switzerland							2nd place, silver medalist(s)		0	1	0	1
29	Turkey			2nd place, silver medalist(s)						0	1	0	1
35	Belgium								3rd place, bronze medalist(s)	0	0	1	1
35	Mexico	3rd place, bronze medalist(s)								0	0	1	1
35	Philippines			3rd place, bronze medalist(s)						0	0	1	1
35	Poland							3rd place, bronze medalist(s)		0	0	1	1
35	Slovenia							3rd place, bronze medalist(s)		0	0	1	1
35	Uruguay	3rd place, bronze medalist(s)								0	0	1	1

^{*}Defunct National Olympic Committees (NOCs) or historical teams are shown in italic.

==== Men ====
Last updated after the 2026 FIBA 3x3 World Cup (As of 7 June 2026)
		Basketball		3x3 basketball		Number of			
		Olympic Games	World Cup	Olympic Games	World Cup	Number of			
Rk.	Nation	Men	Men	Men	Men	1st place, gold medalist(s)	2nd place, silver medalist(s)	3rd place, bronze medalist(s)	Total
1	Serbia	2nd place, silver medalist(s)	2nd place, silver medalist(s)	3rd place, bronze medalist(s)	1st place, gold medalist(s)	1	2	1	4
2	France	2nd place, silver medalist(s)	3rd place, bronze medalist(s)	2nd place, silver medalist(s)	2nd place, silver medalist(s)	0	3	1	4
3	Russia	3rd place, bronze medalist(s)	2nd place, silver medalist(s)	2nd place, silver medalist(s)	3rd place, bronze medalist(s)	0	2	2	4
4	Lithuania	3rd place, bronze medalist(s)	3rd place, bronze medalist(s)	3rd place, bronze medalist(s)	2nd place, silver medalist(s)	0	1	3	4
5	United States	1st place, gold medalist(s)	1st place, gold medalist(s)		1st place, gold medalist(s)	3	0	0	3
6	Spain	2nd place, silver medalist(s)	1st place, gold medalist(s)		1st place, gold medalist(s)	2	1	0	3
7	Argentina	1st place, gold medalist(s)	1st place, gold medalist(s)			2	0	0	2
7	Latvia			1st place, gold medalist(s)	1st place, gold medalist(s)	2	0	0	2
7	Soviet Union^{*}	1st place, gold medalist(s)	1st place, gold medalist(s)			2	0	0	2
7	Yugoslavia^{*}	1st place, gold medalist(s)	1st place, gold medalist(s)			2	0	0	2
11	Netherlands			1st place, gold medalist(s)	2nd place, silver medalist(s)	1	1	0	2
11	Serbia and Montenegro^{*}	2nd place, silver medalist(s)	1st place, gold medalist(s)			1	1	0	2
13	Germany		1st place, gold medalist(s)		2nd place, silver medalist(s)	1	1	0	2
14	Brazil	3rd place, bronze medalist(s)	1st place, gold medalist(s)			1	0	1	2
15	Canada	2nd place, silver medalist(s)	3rd place, bronze medalist(s)			0	1	1	2
15	Croatia	2nd place, silver medalist(s)	3rd place, bronze medalist(s)			0	1	1	2
17	Qatar				1st place, gold medalist(s)	1	0	0	1
18	Greece		2nd place, silver medalist(s)			0	1	0	1
18	Japan	2nd place, silver medalist(s)				0	1	0	1
18	Italy	2nd place, silver medalist(s)				0	1	0	1
18	Switzerland				2nd place, silver medalist(s)	0	1	0	1
18	Turkey		2nd place, silver medalist(s)			0	1	0	1
23	Chile		3rd place, bronze medalist(s)			0	0	1	1
23	Cuba	3rd place, bronze medalist(s)				0	0	1	1
23	Mexico	3rd place, bronze medalist(s)				0	0	1	1
23	Philippines		3rd place, bronze medalist(s)			0	0	1	1
23	Poland				3rd place, bronze medalist(s)	0	0	1	1
23	Slovenia				3rd place, bronze medalist(s)	0	0	1	1
23	Ukraine				3rd place, bronze medalist(s)	0	0	1	1
23	Uruguay	3rd place, bronze medalist(s)				0	0	1	1

^{*}Defunct National Olympic Committees (NOCs) or historical teams are shown in italic.

==== Women ====
Last updated after the 2026 FIBA 3x3 World Cup (As of 7 June 2026)
		Basketball		3x3 basketball		Number of			
		Olympic Games	World Cup	Olympic Games	World Cup	Number of			
Rk.	Nation	Women	Women	Women	Women	1st place, gold medalist(s)	2nd place, silver medalist(s)	3rd place, bronze medalist(s)	Total
1	United States	1st place, gold medalist(s)	1st place, gold medalist(s)	1st place, gold medalist(s)	1st place, gold medalist(s)	4	0	0	4
2	China	2nd place, silver medalist(s)	2nd place, silver medalist(s)	3rd place, bronze medalist(s)	1st place, gold medalist(s)	1	2	1	4
2	Russia	3rd place, bronze medalist(s)	2nd place, silver medalist(s)	2nd place, silver medalist(s)	1st place, gold medalist(s)	1	2	1	4
4	Australia	2nd place, silver medalist(s)	1st place, gold medalist(s)		2nd place, silver medalist(s)	1	2	0	3
5	France	2nd place, silver medalist(s)	3rd place, bronze medalist(s)		1st place, gold medalist(s)	1	1	1	3
6	Spain	2nd place, silver medalist(s)	2nd place, silver medalist(s)	2nd place, silver medalist(s)		0	3	0	3
7	Soviet Union^{*}	1st place, gold medalist(s)	1st place, gold medalist(s)			2	0	0	2
8	Brazil	2nd place, silver medalist(s)	1st place, gold medalist(s)			1	1	0	2
8	Czech Republic		2nd place, silver medalist(s)		1st place, gold medalist(s)	1	1	0	2
10	Bulgaria	2nd place, silver medalist(s)	2nd place, silver medalist(s)			0	2	0	2
10	Japan	2nd place, silver medalist(s)	2nd place, silver medalist(s)			0	2	0	2
10	South Korea	2nd place, silver medalist(s)	2nd place, silver medalist(s)			0	2	0	2
10	Yugoslavia^{*}	2nd place, silver medalist(s)	2nd place, silver medalist(s)			0	2	0	2
14	Canada		3rd place, bronze medalist(s)		2nd place, silver medalist(s)	0	1	1	2
15	Germany			1st place, gold medalist(s)		1	0	0	1
15	Italy				1st place, gold medalist(s)	1	0	0	1
15	Netherlands				1st place, gold medalist(s)	1	0	0	1
15	Unified Team^{*}	1st place, gold medalist(s)				1	0	0	1
19	Chile		2nd place, silver medalist(s)			0	1	0	1
19	Czechoslovakia^{*}		2nd place, silver medalist(s)			0	1	0	1
19	Hungary				2nd place, silver medalist(s)	0	1	0	1
19	Mongolia				2nd place, silver medalist(s)	0	1	0	1
19	Ukraine				2nd place, silver medalist(s)	0	1	0	1
24	Belgium				3rd place, bronze medalist(s)	0	0	1	1
24	Cuba		3rd place, bronze medalist(s)			0	0	1	1
24	Serbia	3rd place, bronze medalist(s)				0	0	1	1

^{*}Defunct National Olympic Committees (NOCs) or historical teams are shown in italic.

=== Basketball ===
==== Men and women ====
Last updated after the 2024 Olympic Games (As of 11 August 2024)
		Basketball				Number of			
		Olympic Games		World Cup		Number of			
Rk.	Nation	Men	Women	Men	Women	1st place, gold medalist(s)	2nd place, silver medalist(s)	3rd place, bronze medalist(s)	Total
1	Soviet Union^{*}	1st place, gold medalist(s)	1st place, gold medalist(s)	1st place, gold medalist(s)	1st place, gold medalist(s)	4	0	0	4
1	United States	1st place, gold medalist(s)	1st place, gold medalist(s)	1st place, gold medalist(s)	1st place, gold medalist(s)	4	0	0	4
3	Yugoslavia^{*}	1st place, gold medalist(s)	2nd place, silver medalist(s)	1st place, gold medalist(s)	2nd place, silver medalist(s)	2	2	0	4
4	Brazil	3rd place, bronze medalist(s)	2nd place, silver medalist(s)	1st place, gold medalist(s)	1st place, gold medalist(s)	2	1	1	4
5	Spain	2nd place, silver medalist(s)	2nd place, silver medalist(s)	1st place, gold medalist(s)	2nd place, silver medalist(s)	1	3	0	4
6	France	2nd place, silver medalist(s)	2nd place, silver medalist(s)	3rd place, bronze medalist(s)	3rd place, bronze medalist(s)	0	2	2	4
6	Russia	3rd place, bronze medalist(s)	3rd place, bronze medalist(s)	2nd place, silver medalist(s)	2nd place, silver medalist(s)	0	2	2	4
8	Australia	3rd place, bronze medalist(s)	2nd place, silver medalist(s)		1st place, gold medalist(s)	1	1	1	3
9	Serbia	2nd place, silver medalist(s)	3rd place, bronze medalist(s)	2nd place, silver medalist(s)		0	2	1	3
10	Canada	2nd place, silver medalist(s)		3rd place, bronze medalist(s)	3rd place, bronze medalist(s)	0	1	2	3
11	Argentina	1st place, gold medalist(s)		1st place, gold medalist(s)		2	0	0	2
12	Serbia and Montenegro^{*}	2nd place, silver medalist(s)		1st place, gold medalist(s)		1	1	0	2
13	Bulgaria		2nd place, silver medalist(s)		2nd place, silver medalist(s)	0	2	0	2
13	China		2nd place, silver medalist(s)		2nd place, silver medalist(s)	0	2	0	2
13	Japan		2nd place, silver medalist(s)		2nd place, silver medalist(s)	0	2	0	2
13	South Korea		2nd place, silver medalist(s)		2nd place, silver medalist(s)	0	2	0	2
17	Chile			3rd place, bronze medalist(s)	2nd place, silver medalist(s)	0	1	1	2
17	Croatia	2nd place, silver medalist(s)		3rd place, bronze medalist(s)		0	1	1	2
19	Cuba	3rd place, bronze medalist(s)			3rd place, bronze medalist(s)	0	0	2	2
19	Lithuania	3rd place, bronze medalist(s)		3rd place, bronze medalist(s)		0	0	2	2
21	Germany			1st place, gold medalist(s)		1	0	0	1
21	Unified Team^{*}		1st place, gold medalist(s)			1	0	0	1
23	Czech Republic				2nd place, silver medalist(s)	0	1	0	1
23	Czechoslovakia^{*}				2nd place, silver medalist(s)	0	1	0	1
23	Greece			2nd place, silver medalist(s)		0	1	0	1
23	Italy	2nd place, silver medalist(s)				0	1	0	1
23	Turkey			2nd place, silver medalist(s)		0	1	0	1
28	Mexico	3rd place, bronze medalist(s)				0	0	1	1
28	Philippines			3rd place, bronze medalist(s)		0	0	1	1
28	Uruguay	3rd place, bronze medalist(s)				0	0	1	1

^{*}Defunct National Olympic Committees (NOCs) or historical teams are shown in italic.

==== Men ====
Last updated after the 2024 Olympic Games (As of 10 August 2024)
		Basketball		Number of			
		Olympic Games	World Cup	Number of			
Rk.	Nation	Men	Men	1st place, gold medalist(s)	2nd place, silver medalist(s)	3rd place, bronze medalist(s)	Total
1	Argentina	1st place, gold medalist(s)	1st place, gold medalist(s)	2	0	0	2
1	Soviet Union^{*}	1st place, gold medalist(s)	1st place, gold medalist(s)	2	0	0	2
1	United States	1st place, gold medalist(s)	1st place, gold medalist(s)	2	0	0	2
1	Yugoslavia^{*}	1st place, gold medalist(s)	1st place, gold medalist(s)	2	0	0	2
5	Serbia and Montenegro^{*}	2nd place, silver medalist(s)	1st place, gold medalist(s)	1	1	0	2
5	Spain	2nd place, silver medalist(s)	1st place, gold medalist(s)	1	1	0	2
7	Brazil	3rd place, bronze medalist(s)	1st place, gold medalist(s)	1	0	1	2
8	Serbia	2nd place, silver medalist(s)	2nd place, silver medalist(s)	0	2	0	2
9	Canada	2nd place, silver medalist(s)	3rd place, bronze medalist(s)	0	1	1	2
9	Croatia	2nd place, silver medalist(s)	3rd place, bronze medalist(s)	0	1	1	2
9	France	2nd place, silver medalist(s)	3rd place, bronze medalist(s)	0	1	1	2
9	Russia	3rd place, bronze medalist(s)	2nd place, silver medalist(s)	0	1	1	2
13	Lithuania	3rd place, bronze medalist(s)	3rd place, bronze medalist(s)	0	0	2	2
14	Germany		1st place, gold medalist(s)	1	0	0	1
15	Greece		2nd place, silver medalist(s)	0	1	0	1
15	Italy	2nd place, silver medalist(s)		0	1	0	1
15	Turkey		2nd place, silver medalist(s)	0	1	0	1
18	Australia	3rd place, bronze medalist(s)		0	0	1	1
18	Chile		3rd place, bronze medalist(s)	0	0	1	1
18	Cuba	3rd place, bronze medalist(s)		0	0	1	1
18	Mexico	3rd place, bronze medalist(s)		0	0	1	1
18	Philippines		3rd place, bronze medalist(s)	0	0	1	1
18	Uruguay	3rd place, bronze medalist(s)		0	0	1	1

^{*}Defunct National Olympic Committees (NOCs) or historical teams are shown in italic.

==== Women ====
Last updated after the 2024 Olympic Games (As of 11 August 2024)
		Basketball		Number of			
		Olympic Games	World Cup	Number of			
Rk.	Nation	Women	Women	1st place, gold medalist(s)	2nd place, silver medalist(s)	3rd place, bronze medalist(s)	Total
1	Soviet Union^{*}	1st place, gold medalist(s)	1st place, gold medalist(s)	2	0	0	2
1	United States	1st place, gold medalist(s)	1st place, gold medalist(s)	2	0	0	2
3	Australia	2nd place, silver medalist(s)	1st place, gold medalist(s)	1	1	0	2
3	Brazil	2nd place, silver medalist(s)	1st place, gold medalist(s)	1	1	0	2
5	Bulgaria	2nd place, silver medalist(s)	2nd place, silver medalist(s)	0	2	0	2
5	China	2nd place, silver medalist(s)	2nd place, silver medalist(s)	0	2	0	2
5	Japan	2nd place, silver medalist(s)	2nd place, silver medalist(s)	0	2	0	2
5	South Korea	2nd place, silver medalist(s)	2nd place, silver medalist(s)	0	2	0	2
5	Spain	2nd place, silver medalist(s)	2nd place, silver medalist(s)	0	2	0	2
5	Yugoslavia^{*}	2nd place, silver medalist(s)	2nd place, silver medalist(s)	0	2	0	2
11	France	2nd place, silver medalist(s)	3rd place, bronze medalist(s)	0	1	1	2
11	Russia	3rd place, bronze medalist(s)	2nd place, silver medalist(s)	0	1	1	2
13	Unified Team^{*}	1st place, gold medalist(s)		1	0	0	1
14	Chile		2nd place, silver medalist(s)	0	1	0	1
14	Czech Republic		2nd place, silver medalist(s)	0	1	0	1
14	Czechoslovakia^{*}		2nd place, silver medalist(s)	0	1	0	1
17	Canada		3rd place, bronze medalist(s)	0	0	1	1
17	Cuba		3rd place, bronze medalist(s)	0	0	1	1
17	Serbia	3rd place, bronze medalist(s)		0	0	1	1

^{*}Defunct National Olympic Committees (NOCs) or historical teams are shown in italic.

=== 3x3 basketball ===
==== Men and women ====
Last updated after the 2026 FIBA 3x3 World Cup (As of 7 June 2026)
		3x3 basketball				Number of			
		Olympic Games		World Cup		Number of			
Rk.	Nation	Men	Women	Men	Women	1st place, gold medalist(s)	2nd place, silver medalist(s)	3rd place, bronze medalist(s)	Total
1	Russia	2nd place, silver medalist(s)	2nd place, silver medalist(s)	3rd place, bronze medalist(s)	1st place, gold medalist(s)	1	2	1	4
2	United States		1st place, gold medalist(s)	1st place, gold medalist(s)	1st place, gold medalist(s)	3	0	0	3
3	Netherlands	1st place, gold medalist(s)		2nd place, silver medalist(s)	1st place, gold medalist(s)	2	1	0	3
4	France	2nd place, silver medalist(s)		2nd place, silver medalist(s)	1st place, gold medalist(s)	1	2	0	3
5	Latvia	1st place, gold medalist(s)		1st place, gold medalist(s)		2	0	0	2
6	Germany		1st place, gold medalist(s)	2nd place, silver medalist(s)		1	1	0	2
6	Spain		2nd place, silver medalist(s)	1st place, gold medalist(s)		1	1	0	2
8	China		3rd place, bronze medalist(s)		1st place, gold medalist(s)	1	0	1	2
9	Serbia	3rd place, bronze medalist(s)		1st place, gold medalist(s)		1	0	1	2
10	Lithuania	3rd place, bronze medalist(s)		2nd place, silver medalist(s)		0	1	1	2
10	Ukraine			3rd place, bronze medalist(s)	2nd place, silver medalist(s)	0	1	1	2
12	Czech Republic				1st place, gold medalist(s)	1	0	0	1
12	Italy				1st place, gold medalist(s)	1	0	0	1
12	Qatar			1st place, gold medalist(s)		1	0	0	1
15	Australia				2nd place, silver medalist(s)	0	1	0	1
15	Canada				2nd place, silver medalist(s)	0	1	0	1
15	Hungary				2nd place, silver medalist(s)	0	1	0	1
15	Mongolia				2nd place, silver medalist(s)	0	1	0	1
15	Switzerland			2nd place, silver medalist(s)		0	1	0	1
20	Belgium				3rd place, bronze medalist(s)	0	0	1	1
20	Poland			3rd place, bronze medalist(s)		0	0	1	1
20	Slovenia			3rd place, bronze medalist(s)		0	0	1	1

==== Men ====
Last updated after the 2026 FIBA 3x3 World Cup (As of 7 June 2026)
		3x3 basketball		Number of			
		Olympic Games	World Cup	Number of			
Rk.	Nation	Men	Men	1st place, gold medalist(s)	2nd place, silver medalist(s)	3rd place, bronze medalist(s)	Total
1	Latvia	1st place, gold medalist(s)	1st place, gold medalist(s)	2	0	0	2
2	Netherlands	1st place, gold medalist(s)	2nd place, silver medalist(s)	1	1	0	2
3	Serbia	3rd place, bronze medalist(s)	1st place, gold medalist(s)	1	0	1	2
4	Lithuania	3rd place, bronze medalist(s)	2nd place, silver medalist(s)	0	1	1	2
4	Russia	2nd place, silver medalist(s)	3rd place, bronze medalist(s)	0	1	1	2
6	France	2nd place, silver medalist(s)	2nd place, silver medalist(s)	0	2	0	2
7	Qatar		1st place, gold medalist(s)	1	0	0	1
7	Spain		1st place, gold medalist(s)	1	0	0	1
7	United States		1st place, gold medalist(s)	1	0	0	1
10	Germany		2nd place, silver medalist(s)	0	1	0	1
10	Switzerland		2nd place, silver medalist(s)	0	1	0	1
12	Poland		3rd place, bronze medalist(s)	0	0	1	1
12	Slovenia		3rd place, bronze medalist(s)	0	0	1	1
12	Ukraine		3rd place, bronze medalist(s)	0	0	1	1

==== Women ====
Last updated after the 2026 FIBA 3x3 World Cup (As of 7 June 2026)
		3x3 basketball		Number of			
		Olympic Games	World Cup	Number of			
Rk.	Nation	Women	Women	1st place, gold medalist(s)	2nd place, silver medalist(s)	3rd place, bronze medalist(s)	Total
1	United States	1st place, gold medalist(s)	1st place, gold medalist(s)	2	0	0	2
2	Russia	2nd place, silver medalist(s)	1st place, gold medalist(s)	1	1	0	2
3	China	3rd place, bronze medalist(s)	1st place, gold medalist(s)	1	0	1	2
4	Czech Republic		1st place, gold medalist(s)	1	0	0	1
4	France		1st place, gold medalist(s)	1	0	0	1
4	Germany	1st place, gold medalist(s)		1	0	0	1
4	Italy		1st place, gold medalist(s)	1	0	0	1
4	Netherlands		1st place, gold medalist(s)	1	0	0	1
9	Australia		2nd place, silver medalist(s)	0	1	0	1
9	Canada		2nd place, silver medalist(s)	0	1	0	1
9	Hungary		2nd place, silver medalist(s)	0	1	0	1
9	Mongolia		2nd place, silver medalist(s)	0	1	0	1
9	Spain	2nd place, silver medalist(s)		0	1	0	1
9	Ukraine		2nd place, silver medalist(s)	0	1	0	1
15	Belgium		3rd place, bronze medalist(s)	0	0	1	1

=== Wheelchair basketball ===
==== Men and women ====
Last updated after the 2024 Summer Paralympics (As of 8 September 2024)
		Wheelchair basketball				Number of			
		Paralympic Games		World Championship		Number of			
Rk.	Nation	Men	Women	Men	Women	1st place, gold medalist(s)	2nd place, silver medalist(s)	3rd place, bronze medalist(s)	Total
1	Canada	1st place, gold medalist(s)	1st place, gold medalist(s)	1st place, gold medalist(s)	1st place, gold medalist(s)	4	0	0	4
1	United States	1st place, gold medalist(s)	1st place, gold medalist(s)	1st place, gold medalist(s)	1st place, gold medalist(s)	4	0	0	4
3	Netherlands	1st place, gold medalist(s)	1st place, gold medalist(s)	2nd place, silver medalist(s)	1st place, gold medalist(s)	3	1	0	4
4	Australia	1st place, gold medalist(s)	2nd place, silver medalist(s)	1st place, gold medalist(s)	3rd place, bronze medalist(s)	2	1	1	4
5	Israel	1st place, gold medalist(s)	1st place, gold medalist(s)	1st place, gold medalist(s)		3	0	0	3
6	Germany	2nd place, silver medalist(s)	1st place, gold medalist(s)		2nd place, silver medalist(s)	1	2	0	3
6	Great Britain	2nd place, silver medalist(s)		1st place, gold medalist(s)	2nd place, silver medalist(s)	1	2	0	3
8	France	1st place, gold medalist(s)		1st place, gold medalist(s)		2	0	0	2
9	Argentina	2nd place, silver medalist(s)	1st place, gold medalist(s)			1	1	0	2
10	China		2nd place, silver medalist(s)		2nd place, silver medalist(s)	0	2	0	2
11	Japan	2nd place, silver medalist(s)	3rd place, bronze medalist(s)			0	1	1	2
12	Sweden	3rd place, bronze medalist(s)		3rd place, bronze medalist(s)		0	0	2	2
13	West Germany^{*}		1st place, gold medalist(s)			1	0	0	1
14	Jamaica		2nd place, silver medalist(s)			0	1	0	1
14	Spain	2nd place, silver medalist(s)				0	1	0	1
16	Iran			3rd place, bronze medalist(s)		0	0	1	1
16	Turkey			3rd place, bronze medalist(s)		0	0	1	1

^{*}Defunct National Paralympic Committees (NPCs) or historical teams are shown in italic.

==== Men ====
Last updated after the 2024 Summer Paralympics (As of 8 September 2024)
		Wheelchair basketball		Number of			
		Paralympic Games	World Championship	Number of			
Rk.	Nation	Men	Men	1st place, gold medalist(s)	2nd place, silver medalist(s)	3rd place, bronze medalist(s)	Total
1	Australia	1st place, gold medalist(s)	1st place, gold medalist(s)	2	0	0	2
1	Canada	1st place, gold medalist(s)	1st place, gold medalist(s)	2	0	0	2
1	France	1st place, gold medalist(s)	1st place, gold medalist(s)	2	0	0	2
1	Israel	1st place, gold medalist(s)	1st place, gold medalist(s)	2	0	0	2
1	United States	1st place, gold medalist(s)	1st place, gold medalist(s)	2	0	0	2
6	Great Britain	2nd place, silver medalist(s)	1st place, gold medalist(s)	1	1	0	2
6	Netherlands	1st place, gold medalist(s)	2nd place, silver medalist(s)	1	1	0	2
8	Sweden	3rd place, bronze medalist(s)	3rd place, bronze medalist(s)	0	0	2	2
9	Argentina	2nd place, silver medalist(s)		0	1	0	1
9	Germany	2nd place, silver medalist(s)		0	1	0	1
9	Japan	2nd place, silver medalist(s)		0	1	0	1
9	Spain	2nd place, silver medalist(s)		0	1	0	1
13	Iran		3rd place, bronze medalist(s)	0	0	1	1
13	Turkey		3rd place, bronze medalist(s)	0	0	1	1

==== Women ====
Last updated after the 2024 Summer Paralympics (As of 8 September 2024)
		Wheelchair basketball		Number of			
		Paralympic Games	World Championship	Number of			
Rk.	Nation	Women	Women	1st place, gold medalist(s)	2nd place, silver medalist(s)	3rd place, bronze medalist(s)	Total
1	Canada	1st place, gold medalist(s)	1st place, gold medalist(s)	2	0	0	2
1	United States	1st place, gold medalist(s)	1st place, gold medalist(s)	2	0	0	2
1	Netherlands	1st place, gold medalist(s)	1st place, gold medalist(s)	1	1	0	2
4	Germany	1st place, gold medalist(s)	2nd place, silver medalist(s)	1	1	0	2
5	China	2nd place, silver medalist(s)	2nd place, silver medalist(s)	0	2	0	2
6	Australia	2nd place, silver medalist(s)	3rd place, bronze medalist(s)	0	1	1	2
7	Argentina	1st place, gold medalist(s)		1	0	0	1
7	Israel	1st place, gold medalist(s)		1	0	0	1
7	West Germany^{*}	1st place, gold medalist(s)		1	0	0	1
10	Great Britain		2nd place, silver medalist(s)	0	1	0	1
10	Jamaica	2nd place, silver medalist(s)		0	1	0	1
12	Japan	3rd place, bronze medalist(s)		0	0	1	1

^{*}Defunct National Paralympic Committees (NPCs) or historical teams are shown in italic.

== See also ==
- FIBA World Rankings
- FIBA Women's World Ranking
- List of major achievements in sports by nation
