= Major achievements in luge by nation =

This article contains lists of achievements in major senior-level international luge tournaments according to first-place, second-place and third-place results obtained by teams representing different nations. The objective is not to create combined medal tables; the focus is on listing the best positions achieved by teams in major international tournaments, ranking the nations according to the most number of podiums accomplished by teams of these nations.

== Results ==
For the making of these lists, results from following major international tournaments were consulted:

Governing body	Tournament	Track
FIL & IOC	Luge at the Winter Olympics (since 1964, quadrennially)	Artificial track
FIL	FIL World Luge Championships (since 1955, annually)	Artificial track
FIL	Luge World Cup (since 1977, annually (Note: The FIL World Luge Championships have taken place on an almost annual basis in non-Winter Olympics years since 1955.))	Artificial track
FIL	FIL World Luge Natural Track Championships (since 1979, biennially)	Natural track

- FIL: International Luge Federation
- IOC: International Olympic Committee

Medals earned by athletes from defunct National Olympic Committees (NOCs) or historical teams are NOT merged with the results achieved by their immediate successor states. The International Olympic Committee (IOC) do NOT combine medals of these nations or teams.

The conventions used on this table are M for men's singles event, MSp for men's sprint event, W for women's singles event, WSp for women's sprint event, D for doubles event, DSp for doubles' sprint event, T for mixed team event.

The tables are pre-sorted by total number of first-place results, second-place results and third-place results, respectively. When equal ranks are given, nations are listed in alphabetical order.

=== Artificial and natural track events ===
==== All competitive disciplines ====
Last updated after the 2025–26 Luge World Cup (As of 8 March 2026)
		Artificial track															Natural track				Number of			
		Olympic Games				World Championships							World Cup				World Championships				Number of			
Rk.	Nation	M	W	D	T	M	W	D	T	MSp	WSp	DSp	M	W	D	T	M	W	D	T	1st place, gold medalist(s)	2nd place, silver medalist(s)	3rd place, bronze medalist(s)	Total
1	Austria	1st place, gold medalist(s)	1st place, gold medalist(s)	1st place, gold medalist(s)	2nd place, silver medalist(s)	1st place, gold medalist(s)	1st place, gold medalist(s)	1st place, gold medalist(s)	1st place, gold medalist(s)	1st place, gold medalist(s)		2nd place, silver medalist(s)	1st place, gold medalist(s)	1st place, gold medalist(s)	1st place, gold medalist(s)	1st place, gold medalist(s)	1st place, gold medalist(s)	1st place, gold medalist(s)	1st place, gold medalist(s)	1st place, gold medalist(s)	16	2	0	18
2	Italy	1st place, gold medalist(s)	1st place, gold medalist(s)	1st place, gold medalist(s)	3rd place, bronze medalist(s)	1st place, gold medalist(s)	1st place, gold medalist(s)	1st place, gold medalist(s)	1st place, gold medalist(s)	3rd place, bronze medalist(s)		2nd place, silver medalist(s)	1st place, gold medalist(s)	1st place, gold medalist(s)	1st place, gold medalist(s)	1st place, gold medalist(s)	1st place, gold medalist(s)	1st place, gold medalist(s)	1st place, gold medalist(s)	1st place, gold medalist(s)	15	1	2	18
3	Germany	1st place, gold medalist(s)	1st place, gold medalist(s)	1st place, gold medalist(s)	1st place, gold medalist(s)	1st place, gold medalist(s)	1st place, gold medalist(s)	1st place, gold medalist(s)	1st place, gold medalist(s)	1st place, gold medalist(s)	1st place, gold medalist(s)	1st place, gold medalist(s)	1st place, gold medalist(s)	1st place, gold medalist(s)	1st place, gold medalist(s)	1st place, gold medalist(s)				3rd place, bronze medalist(s)	15	0	1	16
4	Russia	2nd place, silver medalist(s)			2nd place, silver medalist(s)	1st place, gold medalist(s)	1st place, gold medalist(s)	2nd place, silver medalist(s)	1st place, gold medalist(s)	1st place, gold medalist(s)	1st place, gold medalist(s)	1st place, gold medalist(s)	1st place, gold medalist(s)	2nd place, silver medalist(s)		1st place, gold medalist(s)	2nd place, silver medalist(s)	1st place, gold medalist(s)	1st place, gold medalist(s)	2nd place, silver medalist(s)	10	6	0	16
5	Latvia	3rd place, bronze medalist(s)	2nd place, silver medalist(s)	2nd place, silver medalist(s)	3rd place, bronze medalist(s)	2nd place, silver medalist(s)		2nd place, silver medalist(s)	2nd place, silver medalist(s)	3rd place, bronze medalist(s)	3rd place, bronze medalist(s)	1st place, gold medalist(s)	2nd place, silver medalist(s)		2nd place, silver medalist(s)	2nd place, silver medalist(s)					1	8	4	13
6	United States	2nd place, silver medalist(s)	3rd place, bronze medalist(s)	2nd place, silver medalist(s)		1st place, gold medalist(s)	1st place, gold medalist(s)	2nd place, silver medalist(s)	2nd place, silver medalist(s)		1st place, gold medalist(s)		2nd place, silver medalist(s)	2nd place, silver medalist(s)	1st place, gold medalist(s)	2nd place, silver medalist(s)					4	7	1	12
7	Soviet Union^{*}	2nd place, silver medalist(s)	1st place, gold medalist(s)	2nd place, silver medalist(s)		1st place, gold medalist(s)	1st place, gold medalist(s)	1st place, gold medalist(s)	3rd place, bronze medalist(s)				2nd place, silver medalist(s)	1st place, gold medalist(s)	1st place, gold medalist(s)			3rd place, bronze medalist(s)			6	3	2	11
8	East Germany^{*}	1st place, gold medalist(s)	1st place, gold medalist(s)	1st place, gold medalist(s)		1st place, gold medalist(s)	1st place, gold medalist(s)	1st place, gold medalist(s)	1st place, gold medalist(s)				1st place, gold medalist(s)	1st place, gold medalist(s)	1st place, gold medalist(s)						10	0	0	10
9	West Germany^{*}	2nd place, silver medalist(s)	2nd place, silver medalist(s)	1st place, gold medalist(s)		1st place, gold medalist(s)	1st place, gold medalist(s)	1st place, gold medalist(s)					1st place, gold medalist(s)	1st place, gold medalist(s)	1st place, gold medalist(s)						7	2	0	9
10	Canada		3rd place, bronze medalist(s)		2nd place, silver medalist(s)	1st place, gold medalist(s)	3rd place, bronze medalist(s)		2nd place, silver medalist(s)					2nd place, silver medalist(s)		1st place, gold medalist(s)					2	3	2	7
11	Poland					1st place, gold medalist(s)	1st place, gold medalist(s)	1st place, gold medalist(s)											3rd place, bronze medalist(s)		3	0	1	4
12	Switzerland					2nd place, silver medalist(s)	1st place, gold medalist(s)				1st place, gold medalist(s)										2	1	0	3
13	United Team of Germany^{*}	1st place, gold medalist(s)	1st place, gold medalist(s)																		2	0	0	2
14	Czechoslovakia^{*}						3rd place, bronze medalist(s)	3rd place, bronze medalist(s)													0	0	2	2
15	CIS^{*}																	1st place, gold medalist(s)			1	0	0	1
15	Norway					1st place, gold medalist(s)															1	0	0	1
17	Liechtenstein												3rd place, bronze medalist(s)								0	0	1	1
17	ROC*		3rd place, bronze medalist(s)																		0	0	1	1
17	Slovenia																		3rd place, bronze medalist(s)		0	0	1	1
17	Ukraine						3rd place, bronze medalist(s)														0	0	1	1

^{*}Defunct National Olympic Committees (NOCs) or historical teams are shown in italic.

=== Artificial track events ===
==== All competitive disciplines ====
Last updated after the 2025–26 Luge World Cup (As of 8 March 2026)
		Artificial track															Number of			
		Olympic Games				World Championships							World Cup				Number of			
Rk.	Nation	M	W	D	T	M	W	D	T	MSp	WSp	DSp	M	W	D	T	1st place, gold medalist(s)	2nd place, silver medalist(s)	3rd place, bronze medalist(s)	Total
1	Germany	1st place, gold medalist(s)	1st place, gold medalist(s)	1st place, gold medalist(s)	1st place, gold medalist(s)	1st place, gold medalist(s)	1st place, gold medalist(s)	1st place, gold medalist(s)	1st place, gold medalist(s)	1st place, gold medalist(s)	1st place, gold medalist(s)	1st place, gold medalist(s)	1st place, gold medalist(s)	1st place, gold medalist(s)	1st place, gold medalist(s)	1st place, gold medalist(s)	15	0	0	15
2	Austria	1st place, gold medalist(s)	1st place, gold medalist(s)	1st place, gold medalist(s)	2nd place, silver medalist(s)	1st place, gold medalist(s)	1st place, gold medalist(s)	1st place, gold medalist(s)	1st place, gold medalist(s)	1st place, gold medalist(s)		2nd place, silver medalist(s)	1st place, gold medalist(s)	1st place, gold medalist(s)	1st place, gold medalist(s)	1st place, gold medalist(s)	12	2	0	14
3	Italy	1st place, gold medalist(s)	1st place, gold medalist(s)	1st place, gold medalist(s)	3rd place, bronze medalist(s)	1st place, gold medalist(s)	1st place, gold medalist(s)	1st place, gold medalist(s)	1st place, gold medalist(s)	3rd place, bronze medalist(s)		2nd place, silver medalist(s)	1st place, gold medalist(s)	1st place, gold medalist(s)	1st place, gold medalist(s)	1st place, gold medalist(s)	11	1	2	14
4	Russia	2nd place, silver medalist(s)			2nd place, silver medalist(s)	1st place, gold medalist(s)	1st place, gold medalist(s)	2nd place, silver medalist(s)	1st place, gold medalist(s)	1st place, gold medalist(s)	1st place, gold medalist(s)	1st place, gold medalist(s)	1st place, gold medalist(s)	2nd place, silver medalist(s)		1st place, gold medalist(s)	8	5	0	13
5	Latvia	3rd place, bronze medalist(s)	2nd place, silver medalist(s)	2nd place, silver medalist(s)	3rd place, bronze medalist(s)	2nd place, silver medalist(s)		2nd place, silver medalist(s)	2nd place, silver medalist(s)	3rd place, bronze medalist(s)	3rd place, bronze medalist(s)	1st place, gold medalist(s)	2nd place, silver medalist(s)		2nd place, silver medalist(s)	2nd place, silver medalist(s)	1	8	4	13
6	United States	2nd place, silver medalist(s)	3rd place, bronze medalist(s)	2nd place, silver medalist(s)		1st place, gold medalist(s)	1st place, gold medalist(s)	2nd place, silver medalist(s)	2nd place, silver medalist(s)		1st place, gold medalist(s)		2nd place, silver medalist(s)	2nd place, silver medalist(s)	1st place, gold medalist(s)	2nd place, silver medalist(s)	4	7	1	12
7	East Germany^{*}	1st place, gold medalist(s)	1st place, gold medalist(s)	1st place, gold medalist(s)		1st place, gold medalist(s)	1st place, gold medalist(s)	1st place, gold medalist(s)	1st place, gold medalist(s)				1st place, gold medalist(s)	1st place, gold medalist(s)	1st place, gold medalist(s)		10	0	0	10
8	Soviet Union^{*}	2nd place, silver medalist(s)	1st place, gold medalist(s)	2nd place, silver medalist(s)		1st place, gold medalist(s)	1st place, gold medalist(s)	1st place, gold medalist(s)	3rd place, bronze medalist(s)				2nd place, silver medalist(s)	1st place, gold medalist(s)	1st place, gold medalist(s)		6	3	1	10
9	West Germany^{*}	2nd place, silver medalist(s)	2nd place, silver medalist(s)	1st place, gold medalist(s)		1st place, gold medalist(s)	1st place, gold medalist(s)	1st place, gold medalist(s)					1st place, gold medalist(s)	1st place, gold medalist(s)	1st place, gold medalist(s)		7	2	0	9
10	Canada		3rd place, bronze medalist(s)		2nd place, silver medalist(s)	1st place, gold medalist(s)	3rd place, bronze medalist(s)		2nd place, silver medalist(s)					2nd place, silver medalist(s)		1st place, gold medalist(s)	2	3	2	7
11	Poland					1st place, gold medalist(s)	1st place, gold medalist(s)	1st place, gold medalist(s)									3	0	0	3
12	Switzerland					2nd place, silver medalist(s)	1st place, gold medalist(s)				1st place, gold medalist(s)						2	1	0	3
13	United Team of Germany^{*}	1st place, gold medalist(s)	1st place, gold medalist(s)														2	0	0	2
14	Czechoslovakia^{*}						3rd place, bronze medalist(s)	3rd place, bronze medalist(s)									0	0	2	2
15	Norway					1st place, gold medalist(s)											1	0	0	1
16	Liechtenstein												3rd place, bronze medalist(s)				0	0	1	1
16	ROC*		3rd place, bronze medalist(s)														0	0	1	1
16	Ukraine						3rd place, bronze medalist(s)										0	0	1	1

^{*}Defunct National Olympic Committees (NOCs) or historical teams are shown in italic.

=== Men ===
Last updated after the 2025–26 Luge World Cup (As of 8 March 2026)
		Artificial track				Number of			
		Olympic Games	World Championships		World Cup	Number of			
Rk.	Nation	Men's singles	Men's singles	Men's sprint	Men's singles	1st place, gold medalist(s)	2nd place, silver medalist(s)	3rd place, bronze medalist(s)	Total
1	Austria	1st place, gold medalist(s)	1st place, gold medalist(s)	1st place, gold medalist(s)	1st place, gold medalist(s)	4	0	0	4
1	Germany	1st place, gold medalist(s)	1st place, gold medalist(s)	1st place, gold medalist(s)	1st place, gold medalist(s)	4	0	0	4
3	Italy	1st place, gold medalist(s)	1st place, gold medalist(s)	3rd place, bronze medalist(s)	1st place, gold medalist(s)	3	0	1	4
4	Russia	2nd place, silver medalist(s)	1st place, gold medalist(s)	1st place, gold medalist(s)	1st place, gold medalist(s)	3	1	0	4
5	Latvia	3rd place, bronze medalist(s)	2nd place, silver medalist(s)	3rd place, bronze medalist(s)	2nd place, silver medalist(s)	0	2	2	4
6	East Germany^{*}	1st place, gold medalist(s)	1st place, gold medalist(s)		1st place, gold medalist(s)	3	0	0	3
7	West Germany^{*}	2nd place, silver medalist(s)	1st place, gold medalist(s)		1st place, gold medalist(s)	2	1	0	3
8	Soviet Union^{*}	2nd place, silver medalist(s)	1st place, gold medalist(s)		2nd place, silver medalist(s)	1	2	0	3
9	United States	2nd place, silver medalist(s)	1st place, gold medalist(s)		2nd place, silver medalist(s)	1	2	0	3
10	Canada		1st place, gold medalist(s)			1	0	0	1
10	Norway		1st place, gold medalist(s)			1	0	0	1
10	Poland		1st place, gold medalist(s)			1	0	0	1
10	United Team of Germany^{*}	1st place, gold medalist(s)				1	0	0	1
14	Switzerland		2nd place, silver medalist(s)			0	1	0	1
15	Liechtenstein				3rd place, bronze medalist(s)	0	0	1	1

^{*}Defunct National Olympic Committees (NOCs) or historical teams are shown in italic.

=== Women ===
Last updated after the 2025–26 Luge World Cup (As of 8 March 2026)
		Artificial track				Number of			
		Olympic Games	World Championships		World Cup	Number of			
Rk.	Nation	Women's singles	Women's singles	Women's sprint	Women's singles	1st place, gold medalist(s)	2nd place, silver medalist(s)	3rd place, bronze medalist(s)	Total
1	Germany	1st place, gold medalist(s)	1st place, gold medalist(s)	1st place, gold medalist(s)	1st place, gold medalist(s)	4	0	0	4
2	United States	3rd place, bronze medalist(s)	1st place, gold medalist(s)	1st place, gold medalist(s)	2nd place, silver medalist(s)	2	1	1	4
3	Austria	1st place, gold medalist(s)	1st place, gold medalist(s)		1st place, gold medalist(s)	3	0	0	3
3	East Germany^{*}	1st place, gold medalist(s)	1st place, gold medalist(s)		1st place, gold medalist(s)	3	0	0	3
3	Italy	1st place, gold medalist(s)	1st place, gold medalist(s)		1st place, gold medalist(s)	3	0	0	3
3	Soviet Union^{*}	1st place, gold medalist(s)	1st place, gold medalist(s)		1st place, gold medalist(s)	3	0	0	3
7	Russia		1st place, gold medalist(s)	1st place, gold medalist(s)	2nd place, silver medalist(s)	2	1	0	3
7	West Germany^{*}	2nd place, silver medalist(s)	1st place, gold medalist(s)		1st place, gold medalist(s)	2	1	0	3
9	Canada	3rd place, bronze medalist(s)	3rd place, bronze medalist(s)		2nd place, silver medalist(s)	0	1	2	3
10	Switzerland		1st place, gold medalist(s)	1st place, gold medalist(s)		2	0	0	2
11	Latvia	2nd place, silver medalist(s)		3rd place, bronze medalist(s)		0	1	1	2
12	Poland		1st place, gold medalist(s)			1	0	0	1
12	United Team of Germany^{*}	1st place, gold medalist(s)				1	0	0	1
14	Czechoslovakia^{*}		3rd place, bronze medalist(s)			0	0	1	1
14	ROC*	3rd place, bronze medalist(s)				0	0	1	1
14	Ukraine		3rd place, bronze medalist(s)			0	0	1	1

^{*}Defunct National Olympic Committees (NOCs) or historical teams are shown in italic.

=== Doubles ===
Last updated after the 2025–26 Luge World Cup (As of 8 March 2026)
		Artificial track				Number of			
		Olympic Games	World Championships		World Cup	Number of			
Rk.	Nation	Doubles	Doubles	Doubles' sprint	Doubles	1st place, gold medalist(s)	2nd place, silver medalist(s)	3rd place, bronze medalist(s)	Total
1	Germany	1st place, gold medalist(s)	1st place, gold medalist(s)	1st place, gold medalist(s)	1st place, gold medalist(s)	4	0	0	4
2	Austria	1st place, gold medalist(s)	1st place, gold medalist(s)	2nd place, silver medalist(s)	1st place, gold medalist(s)	3	1	0	4
2	Italy	1st place, gold medalist(s)	1st place, gold medalist(s)	2nd place, silver medalist(s)	1st place, gold medalist(s)	3	1	0	4
4	Latvia	2nd place, silver medalist(s)	2nd place, silver medalist(s)	1st place, gold medalist(s)	2nd place, silver medalist(s)	1	3	0	4
5	East Germany^{*}	1st place, gold medalist(s)	1st place, gold medalist(s)		1st place, gold medalist(s)	3	0	0	3
5	West Germany^{*}	1st place, gold medalist(s)	1st place, gold medalist(s)		1st place, gold medalist(s)	3	0	0	3
7	Soviet Union^{*}	2nd place, silver medalist(s)	1st place, gold medalist(s)		1st place, gold medalist(s)	2	1	0	3
8	United States	2nd place, silver medalist(s)	2nd place, silver medalist(s)		1st place, gold medalist(s)	1	2	0	3
9	Russia		2nd place, silver medalist(s)	1st place, gold medalist(s)		1	1	0	2
10	Poland		1st place, gold medalist(s)			1	0	0	1
11	Czechoslovakia^{*}		3rd place, bronze medalist(s)			0	0	1	1

^{*}Defunct National Olympic Committees (NOCs) or historical teams are shown in italic.

=== Mixed team ===
Last updated after the 2025–26 Luge World Cup (As of 8 March 2026)
		Artificial track			Number of			
		Olympic Games	World Championships	World Cup	Number of			
Rk.	Nation	Mixed team	Mixed team	Mixed team	1st place, gold medalist(s)	2nd place, silver medalist(s)	3rd place, bronze medalist(s)	Total
1	Germany	1st place, gold medalist(s)	1st place, gold medalist(s)	1st place, gold medalist(s)	3	0	0	3
2	Austria	2nd place, silver medalist(s)	1st place, gold medalist(s)	1st place, gold medalist(s)	2	1	0	3
2	Russia	2nd place, silver medalist(s)	1st place, gold medalist(s)	1st place, gold medalist(s)	2	1	0	3
4	Italy	3rd place, bronze medalist(s)	1st place, gold medalist(s)	1st place, gold medalist(s)	2	0	1	3
5	Canada	2nd place, silver medalist(s)	2nd place, silver medalist(s)	1st place, gold medalist(s)	1	2	0	3
6	Latvia	3rd place, bronze medalist(s)	2nd place, silver medalist(s)	2nd place, silver medalist(s)	0	2	1	3
7	United States		2nd place, silver medalist(s)	2nd place, silver medalist(s)	0	2	0	2
8	East Germany^{*}		1st place, gold medalist(s)		1	0	0	1
9	Soviet Union^{*}		3rd place, bronze medalist(s)		0	0	1	1

^{*}Defunct National Olympic Committees (NOCs) or historical teams are shown in italic.

=== Natural track events ===
==== All competitive disciplines ====
Last updated after the FIL World Luge Natural Track Championships 2025 (As of 19 January 2025)
		Natural track				Number of			
		World Championships				Number of			
Rk.	Nation	Men's singles	Women's singles	Doubles	Mixed team	1st place, gold medalist(s)	2nd place, silver medalist(s)	3rd place, bronze medalist(s)	Total
1	Austria	1st place, gold medalist(s)	1st place, gold medalist(s)	1st place, gold medalist(s)	1st place, gold medalist(s)	4	0	0	4
1	Italy	1st place, gold medalist(s)	1st place, gold medalist(s)	1st place, gold medalist(s)	1st place, gold medalist(s)	4	0	0	4
3	Russia	2nd place, silver medalist(s)	1st place, gold medalist(s)	1st place, gold medalist(s)	2nd place, silver medalist(s)	2	2	0	4
4	CIS^{*}		1st place, gold medalist(s)			1	0	0	1
5	Germany				3rd place, bronze medalist(s)	0	0	1	1
5	Poland			3rd place, bronze medalist(s)		0	0	1	1
5	Slovenia			3rd place, bronze medalist(s)		0	0	1	1
5	Soviet Union^{*}		3rd place, bronze medalist(s)			0	0	1	1

^{*}Defunct National Olympic Committees (NOCs) or historical teams are shown in italic.

== See also ==
- List of major achievements in sports by nation
