= List of major achievements in sports by nation =

The following articles list major achievements in team sports and individual sports by nation:

== Team sport ==
Article	Sport	Form
Major achievements in Olympic team ball sports by nation	Olympic team ball sports	**Association football**^{*}, **baseball**^{*}, **basketball**^{*}, **field hockey**^{*}, **ice hockey**^{*}, **indoor handball**^{*}, **indoor volleyball**^{*}, **rugby sevens**^{*}, **softball**^{*}, **water polo**^{*}
Major achievements in association football by nation	Association football	**Association football**^{*}, beach soccer, futsal
Major achievements in baseball and softball by nation	Baseball and softball	**Baseball**^{*}, **softball**^{*}
Major achievements in basketball by nation	Basketball	**Basketball**^{*}, 3x3 basketball, wheelchair basketball^{†}
Major achievements in curling by nation	Curling	**Curling**^{*}, wheelchair curling^{†}
Major achievements in field hockey by nation	Field hockey	**Field hockey**^{*}, indoor field hockey
Major achievements in handball by nation	Handball	**Indoor handball**^{*}, beach handball, field handball
Major achievements in ice hockey by nation	Ice hockey	**Ice hockey**^{*}, Para ice hockey^{†}
Major achievements in roller hockey by nation	Roller hockey	Quad hockey, roller in-line hockey
Major achievements in rugby by nation	Rugby football	Rugby league, **rugby sevens**^{*}, rugby union, wheelchair rugby^{†}
Major achievements in volleyball by nation	Volleyball	**Indoor volleyball**^{*}, **beach volleyball**^{*}, sitting volleyball^{†}
Major achievements in water polo by nation	Water polo	**Water polo**^{*}

^{*}Sports (and forms of a sport) shown in bold are currently on the program of the Olympic Games.
^{†}Sports (and forms of a sport) shown in italic are currently on the program of the Paralympic Games.

== Individual sport ==
Article	Sport	class, discipline or form
Major achievements in cycling by nation	Cycling	**Road bicycle racing**^{*}, **track cycling**^{*}, **mountain bike racing**^{*}, **BMX racing**^{*}, **freestyle BMX**^{*}, marathon mountain bike races, cycle ball
Major achievements in figure skating by nation	Figure skating	**Men's single skating**^{*}, **women's single skating**^{*}, **pair skating**^{*}, **ice dance**^{*}, synchronized skating, **team event**^{*}
Major achievements in gymnastics by nation	Gymnastics	Acrobatic gymnastics, aerobic gymnastics, **artistic gymnastics**^{*}, parkour, **rhythmic gymnastics**^{*}, **trampoline**^{*}, tumbling
Major achievements in judo by nation	Judo	**Extra lightweight**^{*}, **half lightweight**^{*}; **lightweight**^{*}; **half middleweight**^{*}, **middleweight**^{*}, **half heavyweight**^{*}, **heavyweight**^{*}, open category, team event
Major achievements in luge by nation	Luge	**Men's singles**^{*}, men's sprint, **women's singles**^{*}, women's sprint, **doubles**^{*}, doubles' sprint, **team event**^{*}
Major achievements in swimming by nation	Swimming	**Swimming**^{*}, **open water swimming**^{*}
Major achievements in table tennis by nation	Table tennis	**Singles**^{*}, **doubles**^{*}, **team event**^{*}

^{*}Sports (and classes, disciplines or forms of a sport) shown in bold are currently on the program of the Olympic Games.
^{†}Sports (and classes, disciplines or forms of a sport) shown in italic are currently on the program of the Paralympic Games.

== See also ==
- Olympic Games
- Paralympic Games
- World championship
