= Major achievements in curling by nation =

This article contains lists of achievements in major senior-level international curling and wheelchair curling tournaments according to first-place, second-place and third-place results obtained by teams representing different nations. The objective is not to create combined medal tables; the focus is on listing the best positions achieved by teams in major international tournaments, ranking the nations according to the most number of podiums accomplished by teams of these nations.

== Results ==
For the making of these lists, results from following major international tournaments were consulted:

| Form | Governing body | Tournament |
|---|---|---|
| Curling | WCF & IOC | Curling at the Winter Olympics (since 1924, quadrennially (Note: Curling was included in the program of the inaugural Winter Olympic Games in 1924 in Chamonix, although the results of that competition were not considered official by the International Olympic Committee until 2006. The sport was finally added to the official program for the 1998 Winter Olympics.)) |
| Curling | WCF | World Curling Championships (since 1959, annually) |
| Curling | WCF | World Mixed Curling Championship (since 2015, annually) |
| Curling | WCF | World Mixed Doubles Curling Championship (since 2008, annually) |
| Wheelchair curling | WCF & IPC | Wheelchair curling at the Winter Paralympics (since 2006, quadrennially) |
| Wheelchair curling | WCF | World Wheelchair Curling Championship (since 2002, annually) |

- IOC: International Olympic Committee
- IPC: International Paralympic Committee
- WCF: World Curling Federation

Medals earned by athletes from defunct National Olympic Committees (NOCs) and National Paralympic Committees (NPCs) or historical teams are NOT merged with the results achieved by their immediate successor states. The International Olympic Committee (IOC) and International Paralympic Committee (IPC) do NOT combine medals of these nations or teams.

The tables are pre-sorted by total number of first-place results, second-place results and third-place results, respectively. When equal ranks are given, nations are listed in alphabetical order.

=== Curling and wheelchair curling ===
Last updated after the 2026 World Mixed Doubles Curling Championship (As of 2 May 2026)
| | | Curling | | | | | | | Wheelchair curling | | Number of | | | |
| | | Olympic Games | | | World Championships | | | | Paralympic Games | World Championship | Number of | | | |
| Rk. | Nation | Men | Women | Mixed doubles | Men | Women | Mixed | Mixed Doubles | Mixed | Mixed | 1st place, gold medalist(s) | 2nd place, silver medalist(s) | 3rd place, bronze medalist(s) | Total |
|---|---|---|---|---|---|---|---|---|---|---|---|---|---|---|
| 1 | Canada | 1st place, gold medalist(s) | 1st place, gold medalist(s) | 1st place, gold medalist(s) | 1st place, gold medalist(s) | 1st place, gold medalist(s) | 1st place, gold medalist(s) | 2nd place, silver medalist(s) | 1st place, gold medalist(s) | 1st place, gold medalist(s) | 8 | 1 | 0 | 9 |
| 2 | Sweden | 1st place, gold medalist(s) | 1st place, gold medalist(s) | 1st place, gold medalist(s) | 1st place, gold medalist(s) | 1st place, gold medalist(s) | 1st place, gold medalist(s) | 1st place, gold medalist(s) | 2nd place, silver medalist(s) | 2nd place, silver medalist(s) | 7 | 2 | 0 | 9 |
| 3 | Norway | 1st place, gold medalist(s) | | 2nd place, silver medalist(s) | 1st place, gold medalist(s) | 1st place, gold medalist(s) | 1st place, gold medalist(s) | 2nd place, silver medalist(s) | 2nd place, silver medalist(s) | 1st place, gold medalist(s) | 5 | 3 | 0 | 8 |
| 4 | Switzerland | 1st place, gold medalist(s) | 2nd place, silver medalist(s) | 2nd place, silver medalist(s) | 1st place, gold medalist(s) | 1st place, gold medalist(s) | 3rd place, bronze medalist(s) | 1st place, gold medalist(s) | | 1st place, gold medalist(s) | 5 | 2 | 1 | 8 |
| 5 | United States | 1st place, gold medalist(s) | | 2nd place, silver medalist(s) | 1st place, gold medalist(s) | 1st place, gold medalist(s) | | 1st place, gold medalist(s) | | 3rd place, bronze medalist(s) | 4 | 1 | 1 | 6 |
| 6 | China | | 3rd place, bronze medalist(s) | | | 1st place, gold medalist(s) | 3rd place, bronze medalist(s) | 2nd place, silver medalist(s) | 1st place, gold medalist(s) | 1st place, gold medalist(s) | 3 | 1 | 2 | 6 |
| 7 | Scotland^{†} | | | | 1st place, gold medalist(s) | 1st place, gold medalist(s) | 1st place, gold medalist(s) | 1st place, gold medalist(s) | | 1st place, gold medalist(s) | 5 | 0 | 0 | 5 |
| 8 | Russia | | | | | 2nd place, silver medalist(s) | 1st place, gold medalist(s) | 1st place, gold medalist(s) | 2nd place, silver medalist(s) | 1st place, gold medalist(s) | 3 | 2 | 0 | 5 |
| 9 | Germany | | | | 2nd place, silver medalist(s) | 1st place, gold medalist(s) | 2nd place, silver medalist(s) | 3rd place, bronze medalist(s) | | 3rd place, bronze medalist(s) | 1 | 2 | 2 | 5 |
| 10 | Denmark | | 2nd place, silver medalist(s) | | 2nd place, silver medalist(s) | 1st place, gold medalist(s) | | | | 2nd place, silver medalist(s) | 1 | 3 | 0 | 4 |
| 11 | Japan | | 2nd place, silver medalist(s) | | | 2nd place, silver medalist(s) | 2nd place, silver medalist(s) | 2nd place, silver medalist(s) | | | 0 | 4 | 0 | 4 |
| 12 | South Korea | | 2nd place, silver medalist(s) | | | 3rd place, bronze medalist(s) | | | 2nd place, silver medalist(s) | 2nd place, silver medalist(s) | 0 | 3 | 1 | 4 |
| 13 | Finland | 2nd place, silver medalist(s) | | | 3rd place, bronze medalist(s) | | | 2nd place, silver medalist(s) | | 3rd place, bronze medalist(s) | 0 | 2 | 2 | 4 |
| 14 | Great Britain | 1st place, gold medalist(s) | 1st place, gold medalist(s) | | | | | | 2nd place, silver medalist(s) | | 2 | 1 | 0 | 3 |
| 15 | Italy | | | 1st place, gold medalist(s) | 3rd place, bronze medalist(s) | | | 1st place, gold medalist(s) | | | 2 | 0 | 1 | 3 |
| 16 | France | 3rd place, bronze medalist(s) | | | 3rd place, bronze medalist(s) | | | 3rd place, bronze medalist(s) | | | 0 | 0 | 3 | 3 |
| 17 | West Germany^{*} | | | | 2nd place, silver medalist(s) | 1st place, gold medalist(s) | | | | | 1 | 1 | 0 | 2 |
| 18 | Spain | | | | | | 2nd place, silver medalist(s) | 3rd place, bronze medalist(s) | | | 0 | 1 | 1 | 2 |
| 19 | Czech Republic | | | | | | 3rd place, bronze medalist(s) | 3rd place, bronze medalist(s) | | | 0 | 0 | 2 | 2 |
| 20 | Australia | | | | | | | 1st place, gold medalist(s) | | | 1 | 0 | 0 | 1 |
| 20 | Hungary | | | | | | | 1st place, gold medalist(s) | | | 1 | 0 | 0 | 1 |
| 22 | Estonia | | | | | | | 2nd place, silver medalist(s) | | | 0 | 1 | 0 | 1 |
| 22 | New Zealand | | | | | | | 2nd place, silver medalist(s) | | | 0 | 1 | 0 | 1 |
| 24 | Austria | | | | | | | 3rd place, bronze medalist(s) | | | 0 | 0 | 1 | 1 |

^{*}Defunct National Olympic Committees (NOCs) and National Paralympic Committees (NPCs) or historical teams are shown in italic.
^{†}Non International Olympic Committee (IOC) members.

=== Curling ===
==== Men, women and mixed ====
Last updated after the 2026 World Mixed Doubles Curling Championship (As of 2 May 2026)
| | | Curling | | | | | | | Number of | | | |
| | | Olympic Games | | | World Championships | | | | Number of | | | |
| Rk. | Nation | Men | Women | Mixed doubles | Men | Women | Mixed | Mixed Doubles | 1st place, gold medalist(s) | 2nd place, silver medalist(s) | 3rd place, bronze medalist(s) | Total |
|---|---|---|---|---|---|---|---|---|---|---|---|---|
| 1 | Sweden | 1st place, gold medalist(s) | 1st place, gold medalist(s) | 1st place, gold medalist(s) | 1st place, gold medalist(s) | 1st place, gold medalist(s) | 1st place, gold medalist(s) | 1st place, gold medalist(s) | 7 | 0 | 0 | 7 |
| 2 | Canada | 1st place, gold medalist(s) | 1st place, gold medalist(s) | 1st place, gold medalist(s) | 1st place, gold medalist(s) | 1st place, gold medalist(s) | 1st place, gold medalist(s) | 2nd place, silver medalist(s) | 6 | 1 | 0 | 7 |
| 3 | Switzerland | 1st place, gold medalist(s) | 2nd place, silver medalist(s) | 2nd place, silver medalist(s) | 1st place, gold medalist(s) | 1st place, gold medalist(s) | 3rd place, bronze medalist(s) | 1st place, gold medalist(s) | 4 | 2 | 1 | 7 |
| 4 | Norway | 1st place, gold medalist(s) | | 2nd place, silver medalist(s) | 1st place, gold medalist(s) | 1st place, gold medalist(s) | 1st place, gold medalist(s) | 1st place, gold medalist(s) | 5 | 1 | 0 | 6 |
| 5 | United States | 1st place, gold medalist(s) | | 2nd place, silver medalist(s) | 1st place, gold medalist(s) | 1st place, gold medalist(s) | | 1st place, gold medalist(s) | 4 | 1 | 0 | 5 |
| 6 | Scotland^{†} | | | | 1st place, gold medalist(s) | 1st place, gold medalist(s) | 1st place, gold medalist(s) | 1st place, gold medalist(s) | 4 | 0 | 0 | 4 |
| 7 | China | | 3rd place, bronze medalist(s) | | | 1st place, gold medalist(s) | 3rd place, bronze medalist(s) | 2nd place, silver medalist(s) | 1 | 1 | 2 | 4 |
| 8 | Japan | | 2nd place, silver medalist(s) | | | 2nd place, silver medalist(s) | 2nd place, silver medalist(s) | 2nd place, silver medalist(s) | 0 | 4 | 0 | 4 |
| 9 | Russia | | | | | 2nd place, silver medalist(s) | 1st place, gold medalist(s) | 1st place, gold medalist(s) | 2 | 1 | 0 | 3 |
| 10 | Italy | | | 1st place, gold medalist(s) | 3rd place, bronze medalist(s) | | | 1st place, gold medalist(s) | 2 | 0 | 1 | 3 |
| 11 | Denmark | | 2nd place, silver medalist(s) | | 2nd place, silver medalist(s) | 1st place, gold medalist(s) | | | 1 | 2 | 0 | 3 |
| 12 | Germany | | | | 2nd place, silver medalist(s) | 1st place, gold medalist(s) | | 3rd place, bronze medalist(s) | 1 | 1 | 1 | 3 |
| 13 | Finland | 2nd place, silver medalist(s) | | | 3rd place, bronze medalist(s) | | | 2nd place, silver medalist(s) | 0 | 2 | 1 | 3 |
| 14 | France | 3rd place, bronze medalist(s) | | | 3rd place, bronze medalist(s) | | | 3rd place, bronze medalist(s) | 0 | 0 | 3 | 3 |
| 15 | Great Britain | 1st place, gold medalist(s) | 1st place, gold medalist(s) | | | | | | 2 | 0 | 0 | 2 |
| 16 | West Germany^{*} | | | | 2nd place, silver medalist(s) | 1st place, gold medalist(s) | | | 1 | 1 | 0 | 2 |
| 17 | South Korea | | 2nd place, silver medalist(s) | | | 2nd place, silver medalist(s) | | | 0 | 2 | 0 | 2 |
| 18 | Spain | | | | | | 2nd place, silver medalist(s) | 3rd place, bronze medalist(s) | 0 | 1 | 1 | 2 |
| 19 | Czech Republic | | | | | | 3rd place, bronze medalist(s) | 3rd place, bronze medalist(s) | 0 | 0 | 2 | 2 |
| 20 | Australia | | | | | | | 1st place, gold medalist(s) | 1 | 0 | 0 | 1 |
| 20 | Hungary | | | | | | | 1st place, gold medalist(s) | 1 | 0 | 0 | 1 |
| 22 | Estonia | | | | | | | 2nd place, silver medalist(s) | 0 | 1 | 0 | 1 |
| 22 | New Zealand | | | | | | | 2nd place, silver medalist(s) | 0 | 1 | 0 | 1 |
| 24 | Austria | | | | | | | 3rd place, bronze medalist(s) | 0 | 0 | 1 | 1 |

^{*}Defunct National Olympic Committees (NOCs) or historical teams are shown in italic.
^{†}Non International Olympic Committee (IOC) members.

==== Men ====
Last updated after the 2026 World Men's Curling Championship (As of 4 April 2026)
| | | Curling | | Number of | | | |
| | | Olympic Games | World Championships | Number of | | | |
| Rk. | Nation | Men | Men | 1st place, gold medalist(s) | 2nd place, silver medalist(s) | 3rd place, bronze medalist(s) | Total |
|---|---|---|---|---|---|---|---|
| 1 | Canada | 1st place, gold medalist(s) | 1st place, gold medalist(s) | 2 | 0 | 0 | 2 |
| 1 | Norway | 1st place, gold medalist(s) | 1st place, gold medalist(s) | 2 | 0 | 0 | 2 |
| 1 | Sweden | 1st place, gold medalist(s) | 1st place, gold medalist(s) | 2 | 0 | 0 | 2 |
| 1 | Switzerland | 1st place, gold medalist(s) | 1st place, gold medalist(s) | 2 | 0 | 0 | 2 |
| 1 | United States | 1st place, gold medalist(s) | 1st place, gold medalist(s) | 2 | 0 | 0 | 2 |
| 6 | Finland | 2nd place, silver medalist(s) | 3rd place, bronze medalist(s) | 0 | 1 | 1 | 2 |
| 7 | France | 3rd place, bronze medalist(s) | 3rd place, bronze medalist(s) | 0 | 0 | 2 | 2 |
| 8 | Great Britain | 1st place, gold medalist(s) | | 1 | 0 | 0 | 1 |
| 8 | Scotland^{†} | | 1st place, gold medalist(s) | 1 | 0 | 0 | 1 |
| 10 | Denmark | | 2nd place, silver medalist(s) | 0 | 1 | 0 | 1 |
| 10 | Germany | | 2nd place, silver medalist(s) | 0 | 1 | 0 | 1 |
| 10 | Italy | | 2nd place, silver medalist(s) | 0 | 1 | 0 | 1 |
| 10 | West Germany^{*} | | 2nd place, silver medalist(s) | 0 | 1 | 0 | 1 |

^{*}Defunct National Olympic Committees (NOCs) or historical teams are shown in italic.
^{†}Non International Olympic Committee (IOC) members.

==== Women ====
Last updated after the 2026 World Women's Curling Championship (As of 22 March 2026)
| | | Curling | | Number of | | | |
| | | Olympic Games | World Championships | Number of | | | |
| Rk. | Nation | Women | Women | 1st place, gold medalist(s) | 2nd place, silver medalist(s) | 3rd place, bronze medalist(s) | Total |
|---|---|---|---|---|---|---|---|
| 1 | Canada | 1st place, gold medalist(s) | 1st place, gold medalist(s) | 2 | 0 | 0 | 2 |
| 1 | Sweden | 1st place, gold medalist(s) | 1st place, gold medalist(s) | 2 | 0 | 0 | 2 |
| 3 | Denmark | 2nd place, silver medalist(s) | 1st place, gold medalist(s) | 1 | 1 | 0 | 2 |
| 3 | Switzerland | 2nd place, silver medalist(s) | 1st place, gold medalist(s) | 1 | 1 | 0 | 2 |
| 5 | China | 3rd place, bronze medalist(s) | 1st place, gold medalist(s) | 1 | 0 | 1 | 2 |
| 6 | Japan | 2nd place, silver medalist(s) | 2nd place, silver medalist(s) | 0 | 2 | 0 | 2 |
| 6 | South Korea | 2nd place, silver medalist(s) | 2nd place, silver medalist(s) | 0 | 2 | 0 | 2 |
| 8 | Germany | | 1st place, gold medalist(s) | 1 | 0 | 0 | 1 |
| 8 | Great Britain | 1st place, gold medalist(s) | | 1 | 0 | 0 | 1 |
| 8 | Norway | | 1st place, gold medalist(s) | 1 | 0 | 0 | 1 |
| 8 | Scotland^{†} | | 1st place, gold medalist(s) | 1 | 0 | 0 | 1 |
| 8 | United States | | 1st place, gold medalist(s) | 1 | 0 | 0 | 1 |
| 8 | West Germany^{*} | | 1st place, gold medalist(s) | 1 | 0 | 0 | 1 |
| 14 | Russia | | 2nd place, silver medalist(s) | 0 | 1 | 0 | 1 |

^{*}Defunct National Olympic Committees (NOCs) or historical teams are shown in italic.
^{†}Non International Olympic Committee (IOC) members.

==== Mixed ====
Last updated after the 2026 World Mixed Doubles Curling Championship (As of 2 May 2026)
| | | Curling | | | Number of | | | |
| | | Olympic Games | World Championships | | Number of | | | |
| Rk. | Nation | Mixed doubles | Mixed | Mixed Doubles | 1st place, gold medalist(s) | 2nd place, silver medalist(s) | 3rd place, bronze medalist(s) | Total |
|---|---|---|---|---|---|---|---|---|
| 1 | Sweden | 1st place, gold medalist(s) | 1st place, gold medalist(s) | 1st place, gold medalist(s) | 3 | 0 | 0 | 3 |
| 2 | Canada | 1st place, gold medalist(s) | 1st place, gold medalist(s) | 2nd place, silver medalist(s) | 2 | 1 | 0 | 3 |
| 3 | Norway | 2nd place, silver medalist(s) | 1st place, gold medalist(s) | 2nd place, silver medalist(s) | 1 | 2 | 0 | 3 |
| 4 | Switzerland | 2nd place, silver medalist(s) | 3rd place, bronze medalist(s) | 1st place, gold medalist(s) | 1 | 1 | 1 | 3 |
| 5 | Italy | 1st place, gold medalist(s) | | 1st place, gold medalist(s) | 2 | 0 | 0 | 2 |
| 5 | Russia | | 1st place, gold medalist(s) | 1st place, gold medalist(s) | 2 | 0 | 0 | 2 |
| 5 | Scotland^{†} | | 1st place, gold medalist(s) | 1st place, gold medalist(s) | 2 | 0 | 0 | 2 |
| 8 | United States | 2nd place, silver medalist(s) | | 1st place, gold medalist(s) | 1 | 1 | 0 | 2 |
| 9 | Japan | | 2nd place, silver medalist(s) | 2nd place, silver medalist(s) | 0 | 2 | 0 | 2 |
| 10 | China | | 3rd place, bronze medalist(s) | 2nd place, silver medalist(s) | 0 | 1 | 1 | 2 |
| 10 | Spain | | 2nd place, silver medalist(s) | 3rd place, bronze medalist(s) | 0 | 1 | 1 | 2 |
| 12 | Czech Republic | | 3rd place, bronze medalist(s) | 3rd place, bronze medalist(s) | 0 | 0 | 2 | 2 |
| 13 | Australia | | | 1st place, gold medalist(s) | 1 | 0 | 0 | 1 |
| 13 | Hungary | | | 1st place, gold medalist(s) | 1 | 0 | 0 | 1 |
| 15 | Estonia | | | 2nd place, silver medalist(s) | 0 | 1 | 0 | 1 |
| 15 | Finland | | | 2nd place, silver medalist(s) | 0 | 1 | 0 | 1 |
| 15 | New Zealand | | | 2nd place, silver medalist(s) | 0 | 1 | 0 | 1 |
| 18 | Austria | | | 3rd place, bronze medalist(s) | 0 | 0 | 1 | 1 |
| 18 | France | | | 3rd place, bronze medalist(s) | 0 | 0 | 1 | 1 |
| 18 | Germany | | | 3rd place, bronze medalist(s) | 0 | 0 | 1 | 1 |

^{†}Non International Olympic Committee (IOC) members.

=== Wheelchair curling ===
Last updated after the 2026 Winter Paralympics (As of 14 March 2026)
| | | Wheelchair curling | | Number of | | | |
| | | Paralympic Games | World Championship | Number of | | | |
| Rk. | Nation | Mixed | Mixed | 1st place, gold medalist(s) | 2nd place, silver medalist(s) | 3rd place, bronze medalist(s) | Total |
|---|---|---|---|---|---|---|---|
| 1 | Canada | 1st place, gold medalist(s) | 1st place, gold medalist(s) | 2 | 0 | 0 | 2 |
| 1 | China | 1st place, gold medalist(s) | 1st place, gold medalist(s) | 2 | 0 | 0 | 2 |
| 3 | Norway | 2nd place, silver medalist(s) | 1st place, gold medalist(s) | 1 | 1 | 0 | 2 |
| 3 | Russia | 2nd place, silver medalist(s) | 1st place, gold medalist(s) | 1 | 1 | 0 | 2 |
| 5 | South Korea | 2nd place, silver medalist(s) | 2nd place, silver medalist(s) | 0 | 2 | 0 | 2 |
| 5 | Sweden | 2nd place, silver medalist(s) | 2nd place, silver medalist(s) | 0 | 2 | 0 | 2 |
| 7 | Scotland^{†} | | 1st place, gold medalist(s) | 1 | 0 | 0 | 1 |
| 7 | Switzerland | | 1st place, gold medalist(s) | 1 | 0 | 0 | 1 |
| 9 | Denmark | | 2nd place, silver medalist(s) | 0 | 1 | 0 | 1 |
| 9 | Great Britain | 2nd place, silver medalist(s) | | 0 | 1 | 0 | 1 |
| 11 | Finland | | 3rd place, bronze medalist(s) | 0 | 0 | 1 | 1 |
| 11 | Germany | | 3rd place, bronze medalist(s) | 0 | 0 | 1 | 1 |
| 11 | United States | | 3rd place, bronze medalist(s) | 0 | 0 | 1 | 1 |

^{†}Non International Paralympic Committee (IPC) members.

== See also ==
- World Curling Rankings
- List of major achievements in sports by nation
