= Swimming injuries =

Injuries caused by swimming

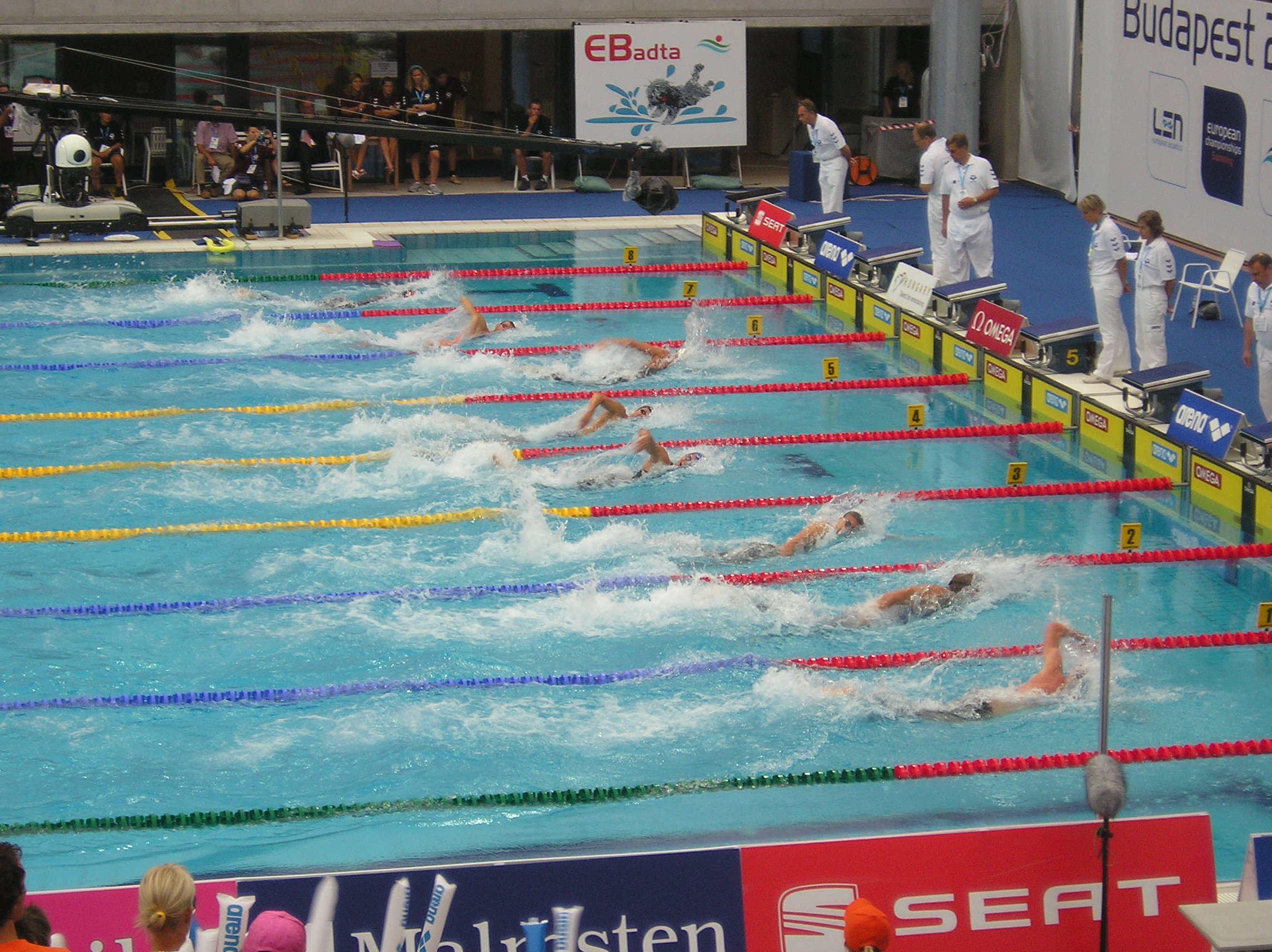

Swimming injuries have many different causes, and can occur immediately or can occur as the result of a long-term swimming career. Some ways that swimmers can increase the risk of an injury are by overuse of a specific part of the body, lacking crucial flexibility and strength, etc. These injuries, like swimmer's shoulder and breaststroker’s knee, cause pain to the swimmer in certain regions that permit necessary movement for the required precise technique. Although these injuries can halt a professional swimmer's career, many can be treated and some can even be prevented. There are different procedures and exercises that can either prevent an injury or help with recovering from an injury. Many of the exercises are specific to the injury and vary in helpfulness according to the person and the technique used for the exercise.

Compared to athletes who play other sports, competitive swimmers are at higher than average risk of overuse injuries and injuries caused by early sports specialization among children and teenagers.

== Swimmer's shoulder ==
Swimmer's shoulder is the name given to a broad range of repetitive motion injuries that typically occur in swimmers. Typical swim-related shoulder pain occurs in the front and side of the upper shoulder complex. Pain often will radiate into the upper arm or can extend into the lower neck and upper back region. Pain associated with swimmer's shoulder often starts as an irritating soreness following swim training and can persist, escalating to a constant, intense pain that limits shoulder mobility and ultimately athletic performance.

While there are a number of contributing factors leading to the development of swimmer's shoulder, it is believed that the three main causes of swimmer's shoulder are: 1. faulty swim stroke technique, 2. repetitive use with inadequate rest, and 3. overdeveloped anterior shoulder and chest musculature.

The primary cause of swimmer's shoulder is faulty biomechanics due to improper swim stroke technique. Professional swim coaches are trained on finding and correcting improper swim stroke technique before it becomes a problem for the athlete. Correcting the swimmer's technique is key to the recovery process. If a swimmer is allowed to continue with improper technique, repetitive irritation of the shoulder structures occurs, eventually creating a "pincher-type impingement" within the shoulder. Elevating the arm and forward circumduction of the shoulder becomes painful. A few examples of improper techniques that can contribute to a swimmer's shoulder are initiating an arm pull before finishing a breath, training with unilateral breathing, and faulty hand placement during entry.

Another cause of swimmer's shoulder is repetitive use with inadequate rest. Overuse of the shoulder muscles and surrounding muscles can lead to fatigue of the muscles. When muscles are fatigued, they respond less effectively. With each stroke, biomechanics break down causing vital structures to inflame. If the soft tissue structures such as tendons and ligaments are not given enough time to repair and for the swelling to resolve, the structures can become damaged.

=== Treatment methods ===
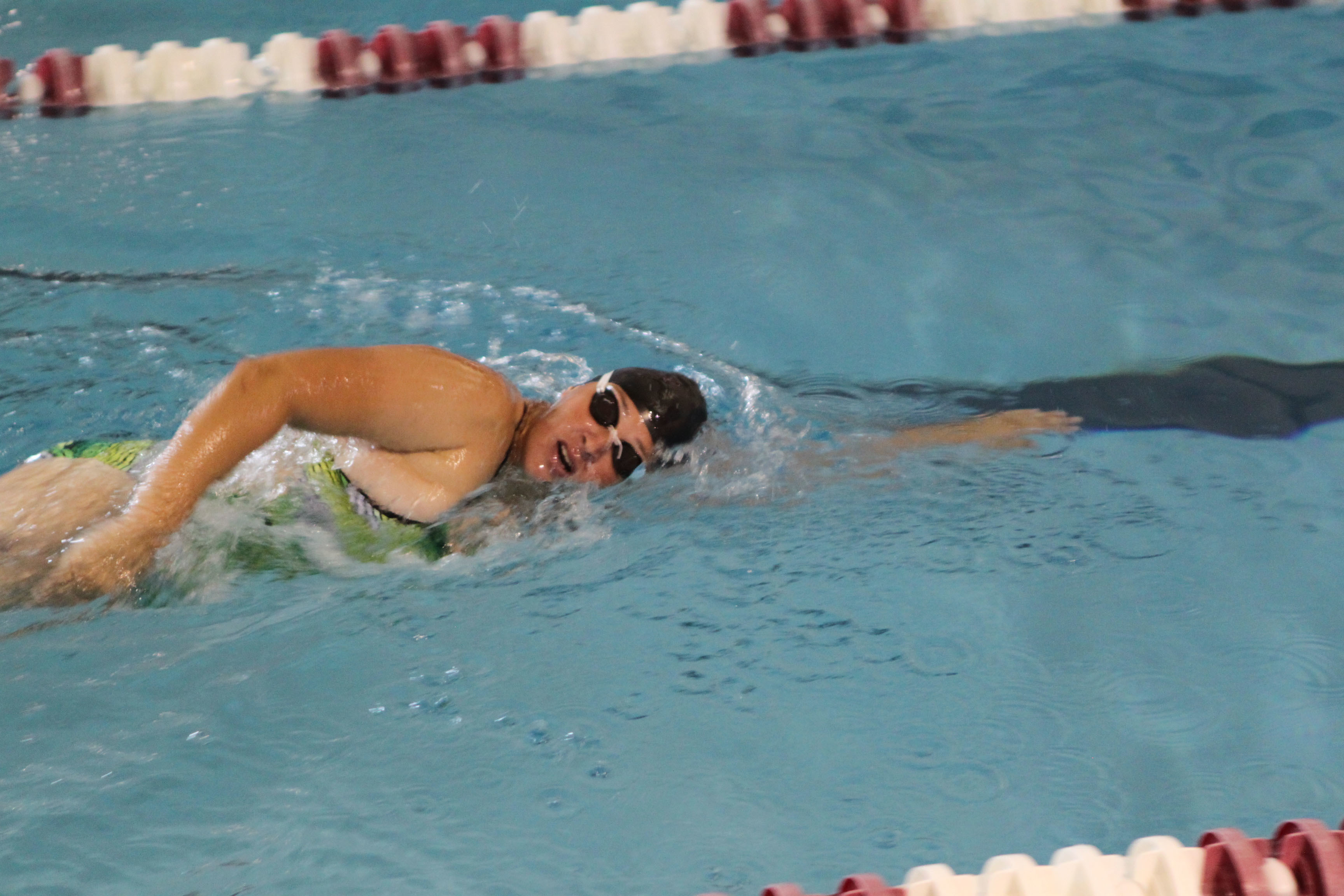

Some treatment methods include; warming up slowly prior to training, avoiding strokes and positions that cause pain (butterfly or freestyle), fixing any bad technique that could be causing the pain, adjusting the distance and frequency of training to avoid further overuse of the muscles, discontinue the use of paddles, increase kick sets to allow the shoulder to rest however limit the use of kickboards and avoid pulling sets. Increase the use of fins to assist with maintaining a good body position and to avoid drag, avoid dry land upper body weight training, ice the shoulder daily, consider the use of anti-inflammatory creams and medicines, and seek the advice of a medical professional.

== Breaststroker's knee ==
Breaststroker’s knee is the name given to pain felt within and around the knee that is experienced by swimmers. It is named this due to the fact it is most commonly only breaststrokers that experience pain within the knee and around the knee. Most swimmers will have no problems with their knees however ‘the majority (86%) of breaststroke swimmers will have experienced knee pain at one point in their career and 47.2% of them will have had this problem at least one time every week.’

There are several factors that increase the swimmer's chances of developing knee pain and inflammation of the knee muscles such as the increasing age of the swimmer, the length of the competitive career, the length of the event, inadequate warm-up, strength imbalance of hip abductors/adductors and flexibility imbalance of hip abductors/adductors.

=== Prevention and treatment ===
In order to prevent the development of knee pain and inflammation of the knee muscles it is recommended that swimmers use a well-designed strength and stretching program, warm up adequately, use the correct breaststroke kick technique, gradually build up the distance of breaststroke swimming and a balanced training program that focuses on not only breaststroke and also has training sessions that allows for adequate recovery of the knee muscles to prevent fatigue of the muscles causing overuse, inflammation, and pain.

Treatment of breaststroker's knee includes resting the knee muscles, icing daily, elevating the limb, strengthening and stretching, support e.g. strapping or knee braces, seeking medical advice which can lead to physiotherapy, cortisone injections, and in few cases surgery.
