= Preadolescence =

Stage of human development

Preadolescence is a stage of human development following middle childhood and preceding adolescence. It commonly ends with the beginning of puberty. Preadolescence is commonly defined as ages 9–12 ending with the major onset of puberty. It may also be defined as simply the 2-year period before the major onset of puberty. Preadolescence can bring its own challenges and anxieties.

== Terminology ==
A term used to refer to the preadolescent stage in everyday speech is tween and its perhaps older variants tweenie, tweeny, tweenager, preteen and tweener. It is a blend (portmanteau) of the words "teen" and "between" in the sense of "between childhood and adolescence" and refers to 9- to 12-year-olds. Sometimes the terms tweenie and tweenager are used to differentiate between older (10 to 15) and younger (7 to 11) age groups, respectively.

While known as preadolescent in psychology, the terms preteen or tween are common in everyday use. A preteen or preteenager is a person below 13 years of age. Generally, the term is restricted to those close to reaching age 13, especially ages 9 to 12. Tween is an American neologism and marketing term for preteen, which is a blend of between and teen. People within this age range are variously described as tweens, preadolescents, tweenies, preteens, pubescents, middle schoolers, or tweenagers.

A junior high school can sometimes be confused with a middle school. Though serving a similar purpose in bridging a gap between elementary school and high school, a junior high school typically serves 7th to 9th grade students, whereas a middle school serves 6th to 8th grade students. Therefore, middle schools serve a slightly younger demographic, more befitting of preadolescents, while junior high schools typically serve young adolescents.

== Prepubescence, puberty, and age range ==
Approximate outline of development periods in child development. Preadolescence and preteen marked at center right

Illustration of the Tanner scale for males

Being prepubescent is not the same thing as being preadolescent. Instead, prepubescent (and sometimes child) is a term for boys and girls who have not developed secondary sex characteristics, while preadolescent is generally defined as those ranging from age 9 to 12 years. Preadolescence may also be defined as the period from 10 to 13 years.

The point at which a child becomes an adolescent is defined by the major onset of puberty. However, in some individuals (particularly females), puberty begins in the preadolescence years. Studies indicate that the onset of puberty has been one year earlier with each generation since the 1950s.

One can also distinguish middle childhood and preadolescence – middle childhood from approximately 5–8 years, as opposed to the time children are generally considered to reach preadolescence. There is no exact agreement as to when preadolescence starts and ends.

=== Hormonal development and the development of secondary sex characteristics ===
Early puberty begins as the result of the initiation of the pulsatile gonadotropin-releasing hormone (GnRH) secretion by the hypothalamus; the exact mechanism of this initiation is currently unknown and remains under investigation. Pulsatile GnRH secretion results in the pulsatile secretions of gonadotropins Luteinizing Hormone (LH) and Follicle Stimulating Hormone (FSH), which act on the gonads (ovaries in females or testicles in males) to cause increase secretion of sex steroids. In females, the predominant sex steroid released is estrogen and in males, the predominant sex steroid released is testosterone. These sex hormones then lead to the development of secondary sex characteristics.

Illustration of the Tanner scale for females

The stages of puberty can be described with the Tanner scale, also known as the Sexual Maturity Rating, which incorporates measurements and characteristics of primary and secondary sex characteristics. For example, genital and breast development, as well as pubic hair growth. Pubertal development is regulated by the hypothalamic-pituitary-gonadal (HPG) axis. Tanner staging ranges from 1 through 5 (with 5 being the most developed).

With regard to pubic hair development, the scale goes as follows: Stage 1-no hair; 2-downy hair; 3-scant terminal hair; 4-terminal hair overlying the pubic triangle; 5-terminal hair extending to the thigh. With regard to male genitalia development, the scale goes as follows: 1-testes at the same size and proportion of early childhood; 2-enlargement of the scrotum/change in texture of scrotal skin; 3-growth of the penis length-wise; 4-growth of the penis in terms of length and circumference; 5-adult-sized genitalia.

With regard to female breast development, the scale is as follows: 1-no palpable gland tissue; 2-palpable breast bud under areola; 3-breast tissue palpable outside of areola; 4-areola elevated above breast contour; 5-areolar mound recedes into single breast contour. The average age in which both males and females reach Tanner stage 5 of pubertal development is around 15–16.

== Neurological development ==
There are significant neurological changes that are expressed during preadolescence. White matter refers to the region of the nervous system corresponding to neuronal axons, which form fibers that convey information across different regions of the brain. In contrast, grey matter refers to the region of the nervous system corresponding to neuronal cell bodies, which process and relay neuronal signals. White matter volume increases at a relatively linear rate of about 12% from ages 4 through 22, specifically focused in the frontal, parietal, and occipital lobes. Increases in white matter volume may be correlated to improvements of fine motor performance, auditory processing, as well as sensory information transfer between language areas of the brain. In contrast, cortical gray matter increases in early life, peaks in preadolescence, and declines through adulthood, with the exception of occipital lobe gray matter. For example, parietal lobe gray matter peaks at age 10 in girls and 12 in boys, while frontal lobe gray matter peaks at age 11 in girls and 12 in boys. Such changes might reflect overproduction of synapses in the preadolescent years; in subsequent years, there seems to be pruning dependent on environmental context, corresponding to increased synchronicity of neuron firing. A key caveat from these imaging studies, however, is that there exists significant variability in the timing and characteristics of neurological change in preadolescents. Neurological changes, particularly in the prefrontal cortex, appear to be highly dependent on environmental input. Toxins, hormones, and lifestyle factors including stress and nutrition impact neurological maturation, demonstrating the importance of early lifestyle health interventions in preadolescence with regard to neurological and psychological development.

== Psychological and social development ==
Of the 'two major socializing agents in children's lives: the family environment...and formal educational institutions,' it is 'the family in its function a primary socializer of the child' that predominates in the first five years of life: middle childhood by contrast is characterized by 'a child's readiness for school...being self-assured and interested; knowing what kind of behavior is expected...being able to wait, to follow directions, and getting along with other children.'

Preadolescent children have a different view of the world from younger children in many significant ways. Typically, theirs is a more realistic view of life than the intense, fantasy-oriented world of earliest childhood. Preadolescents have more mature, sensible, realistic thoughts and actions: 'the most "sensible" stage of development...the child is a much less emotional being now.' They will often have developed a sense of ' intentionality. The wish and capacity to have an impact, and to act upon that with persistence'; and will have a more developed sense of looking into the future and seeing effects of their actions (as opposed to early childhood where children often do not worry about their future). This can include more realistic job expectations ("I want to be an engineer when I grow up", as opposed to "I want to be a wizard"). Middle children generally show more investment 'in control over external reality through the acquisition of knowledge and competence': where they do have worries, these may be more a fear of kidnappings, rapes, and scary media events, as opposed to fantasy things (e.g., witches, monsters, ghosts).

Preadolescents may well view human relationships differently (e.g. they may notice the flawed, human side of authority figures). Alongside that, they may begin to develop a sense of self-identity, and to have increased feelings of independence: 'may feel an individual, no longer "just one of the family."' A different view on morality can emerge; and the middle child will also show more cooperativeness. The ability to balance one's own needs with those of others in group activities'. Many preadolescents will often start to question their home life and surroundings around this time and they may also start to form opinions that may differ from their upbringing in regards to issues such as politics, religion, sexuality, and gender roles.

They may choose their own activities, though they are still susceptible to pressure from others around them. Many preadolescents play organized sports, but necessary free play (self-directed, freely chosen, independent play) may get overlooked. Early sports specialization (choosing a single sport to play intensively or year-round) before puberty has a high risk of injuries. Youth sports organizations recommend a minimum of five hours of free play per week for preadolescent athletes.

Greater responsibility within the family can also appear, as middle children become responsible for younger siblings and relatives, as with babysitting; while preadolescents may start caring about what they look like and what they are wearing.

Prior to adolescence, children may have a dependence on their family as their main agent of socialization. This helps the child establish their attitudes, viewpoints, social norms, and societal roles.

Among these changes is the shift from elementary to middle (or junior high) school. In this unfamiliar environment, the child may find the pressure to rapidly adapt and fit in. Children start to spend less time with family and more time with friends. At this time, socialization by the school and peer environment can become more predominant, as the preadolescent starts to learn more about how they would wish to hold themselves during interpersonal relationships.

While children find this need to fit in, preadolescents have a conflicting desire to establish their own individualism. As the child grows into the transitionary period of preadolescence, the child often starts to develop a sense of autonomy as the child is exposed to a larger world around them full of sudden and unfamiliar changes. Compounded with a sense of self-consciousness, the preadolescent starts to explore their own self-identity and their role in society further.

=== Development of sexual orientation ===
During preadolescence (early adolescence), individuals may become more preoccupied with body image and privacy, corresponding to physical changes seen during adrenarche and puberty. Early adolescents may become aware of their sexuality for the first time, and experience attraction towards others. Homosexual and heterosexual experimentation is not uncommon, although many teens who eventually identify as LGBT do not always do so during adolescence. On average, gay, lesbian, and bisexual individuals report experiencing same-sex attraction in early adolescence, at age 12. About 4 in 10 gay men, and 2 in 10 lesbian women report experiencing same-sex attraction before age 10. For individuals who begin to experience same-sex attraction, familial support and acceptance consistently predicts positive outcomes. Parents and guardians can support preadolescents, regardless of sexual orientation, by having honest conversations about sex. Specifically, parents can talk and listen in a way that invites preadolescents to have an open discussion about sexual orientation.

=== Home from home ===
Where development has been optimal, preadolescents 'come to school for something to be added to their lives; they want to learn lessons...which can lead to their eventually working in a job like their parents.' When earlier developmental stages have gone astray, however, then, on the popular assumption that 'if you miss a stage, you can always go through it later,' some middle children 'come to school for another purpose...[not] to learn but to find a home from home...a stable emotional situation in which they can exercise their own emotional lability, a group of which they can gradually become a part.'

=== Divorce ===
Children at the threshold of adolescence in the nine-to-twelve-year-old group would seem to have particular vulnerabilities to parental separation. Among such problems were the very "eagerness of these youngsters to be co-opted into the parental battling; their willingness to take sides...and the intense, compassionate, caretaking relations which led these youngsters to attempt to rescue a distressed parent often to their own detriment".

=== Media ===
Preadolescents may well be more exposed to popular culture than younger children and have interests based on internet trends, television shows and movies (no longer just cartoons), fashion, technology, music and social media. Preadolescents generally prefer certain brands, and are a heavily targeted market of many advertisers. Their tendency to buy brand-name items may be due to a desire to fit in, although the desire is not as strong as it is with teenagers.

Some scholars suggest that 'pre-adolescents ... reported frequent encounters with sexual material in the media, valued the information received from it, and used it as a learning resource ... and evaluated such content through what they perceived to be sexual morality.' However, other research has suggested that sexual media influences on preadolescent and adolescent sexual behavior is minimal.

== Freud ==
Freud called this stage the latency period to indicate that sexual feelings and interest went underground. Erik H. Erikson noted that latency period children in middle childhood can then direct more of their energy into asexual pursuits such as school, athletics, and same-sex friendships. Nevertheless, recent research contradicts these notions—suggesting that sexual development, interest, and behavior among latent period children does not cease. Instead, the apparent lack of sexual interest is due to children not sharing their sexual interests/emotions with adults.

== See also ==
- Middle grade literature
- Precocious puberty

Preceded by Childhood	Stages of human development Preadolescence	Succeeded by Adolescence
