= Early sports specialization =

Childhood concentration on a particular sport

Early sports specialization is the phenomenon of a child or teenaged athlete intensively pursuing a single sport or athletic activity year-round, instead of participating in a wide variety of activities. Premature emphasis on a single sport is associated with physical injuries, mental health problems, and psychosocial harm to young athletes. Many young athletes who are pushed to excel in a single sport quit playing prematurely, or are forced to stop because of injuries.

Early sports specialization and the intensive training that accompanies it is associated with sports injuries, especially overuse injuries, and a higher rate of serious or career-ending injury among teenagers and young adults compared to multi-sport athletes. In addition to overtraining, early sports specialization risks burnout and a refusal to continue playing. Multi-sport youth athletes also have more fun playing sports, and once the young athlete becomes a teenager, are more likely to enjoy their sports activities and are less likely to quit than those who specialized early.

Early sports specialization is often motivated by a mistaken belief that starting early will result in better performance as a young adult. However, most successful elite athletes did not specialize until at least the middle of adolescence, and some remain multi-sport athletes. Long-term athlete development programs encourage young athletes to develop the ABCs of physical literacy (agility, balance, coordination, and speed) by playing a variety of different sports. Playing a variety of sports before specializing (if wanted) in the late teens increases the likelihood that the youth athlete will experience a lifetime of sports and physical fitness. Early sports specialization is associated with shorter athletic careers. Early sports specialization is part of the increasing dominance of adults in children's leisure activities.

Early sports specialization is opposed by many sports and medical organizations, including the International Olympic Committee and the American Orthopaedic Society for Sports Medicine.

== Definition ==
Sports specialization means pursuing one sport for all, or most of, the year. This typically includes playing the sport as part of an adult-organized sports program or team for at least eight months each year. Early sports specialization is choosing one sport before the age of 16, and especially before the age of 12 (or before puberty). The alternative to sports specialization is being a multi-sport athlete. Late sports specialization, after growing up playing a variety of different sports, does not carry the same risks.

For most young athletes, early sports specialization includes giving up other sports and following an intensive training regimen. An intensive training program usually means more hours per week of organized sports activities than the athlete is years old (e.g., 8 hours per week for an 8 year old, 16 hours per week for a 16 year old). While this is more than a casual recreational player, who might attend a gymnastics class for an hour or two a week, it is less than some young athletes have been pushed to do.

== Causes ==
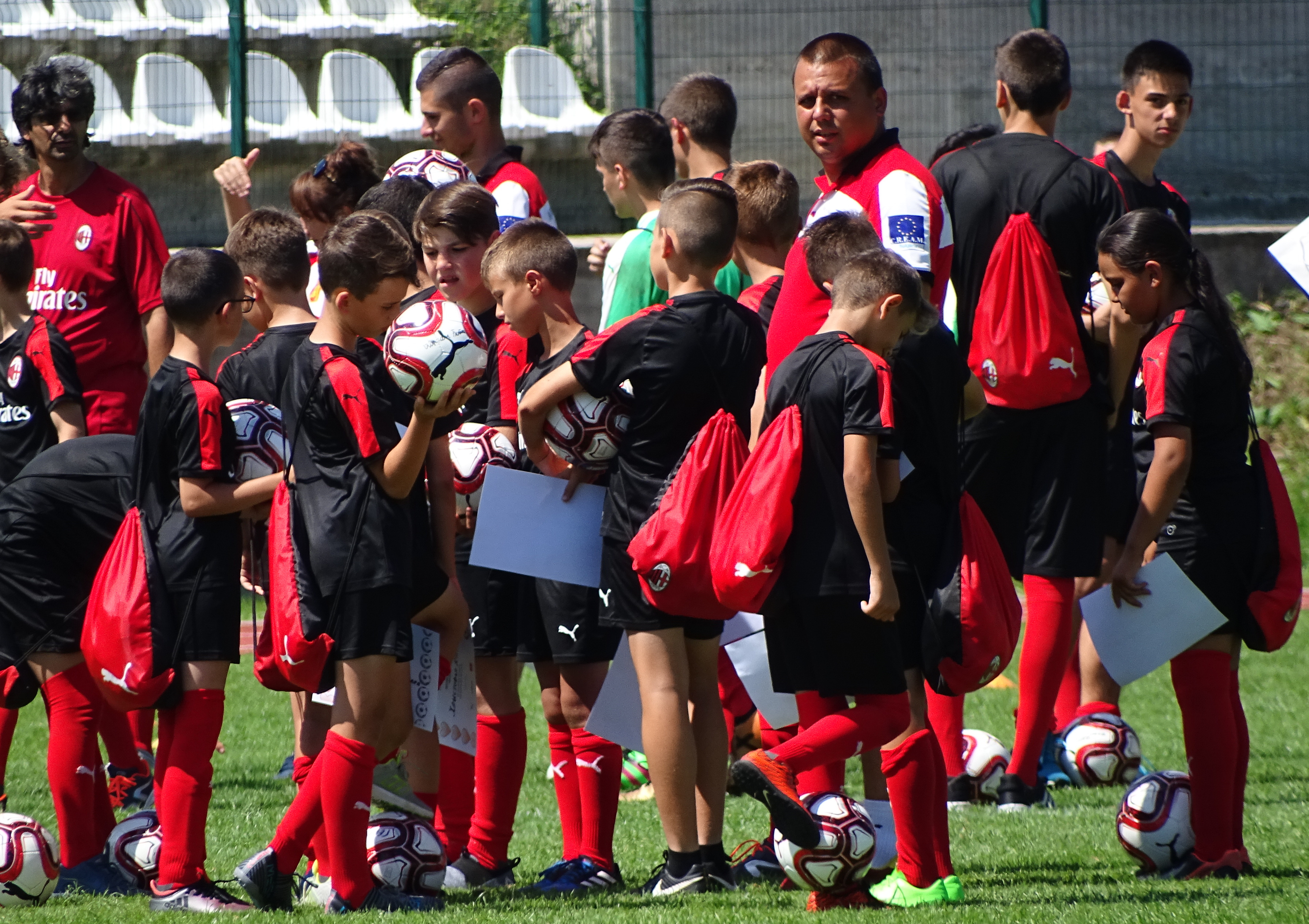
The coach has significant influence on whether young players specialize in a single sport.

Early sports specialization is encouraged by parents, paid coaches, and other people, some of whom hope to produce the next star athlete, rather than by the children or teenagers. These adults may put young athletes in travel league sports at a young age or create a high-pressure, intensive training program that emphasizes competition and neglects the biological need for rest and recovery. The willingness of travel leagues to take children as young as age 7 increases the risk of early sports specialization. Coaches have significant influence on the decision to specialize in one sport and to train intensively for that one sport. A third of adolescent athletes have been pressured to specialize by a coach. Parents are generally trying to do the best thing for their children, but most are unaware that early sports specialization is unnecessary and can be harmful. Parents are one of the most significant determinants of early sports specialization by younger children.

Parents and coaches may encourage early sports specialization out of the mistaken belief that this specialization is necessary for elite performance as an adult. However, early diversification followed by late specialization is more likely to lead to elite status. Playing multiple sports may improve performance through development of foundational transferable athletic skills. A large majority of elite young adult athletes, such as NCAA Division I athletes and first-round NFL draft picks, were multi-sport athletes, and many played multiple sports even through the end of high school. Most elite athletes did not specialize or begin intensive training until they were older teenagers. Elite athletes in most sports, such as track and field, weightlifting, cycling, rowing, swimming, skiing, are less likely to have done intensive training at a young age than the near-elite athletes. NCAA Division I athletes tended to play multiple sports in high school, and only one in six specialized in a single sport before the age of 12. In the 2015 NFL Scouting Combine, six out of seven invited college athletes were multi-sport athletes in high school.

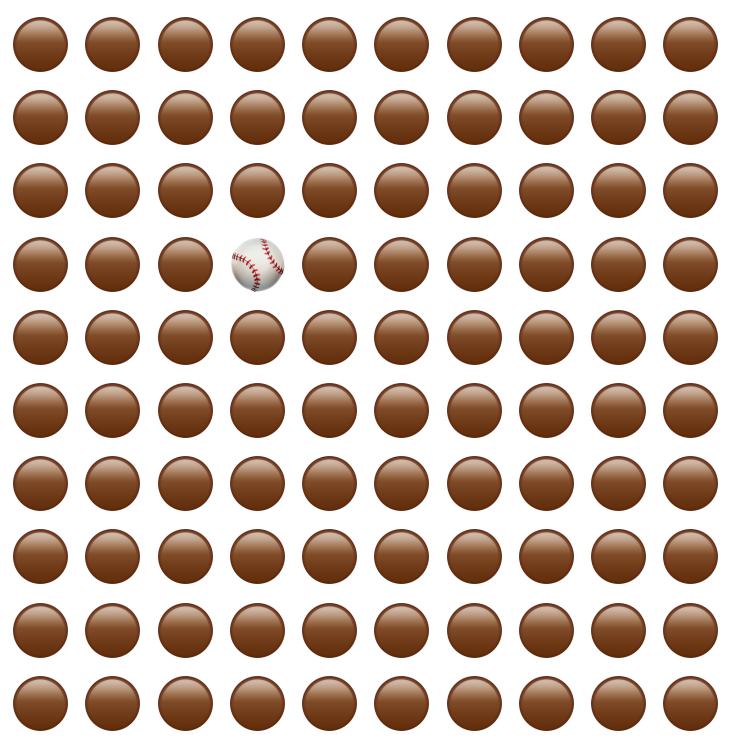
Less than 1% of high school baseball players are ever hired by a professional baseball team, even in the minor leagues. In many other sports, the chances are even lower.

Coaches and expensive sports programs sometimes overstate the likelihood of a young athlete becoming a professional athlete or winning college scholarships. Colleges in the US feed into this fantasy by scouting and ranking players as early as sixth grade. Although many high school athletes specialize in one year-round sport, less than 1% of high school athletes become professional athletes, and early sports specialization does not appear to contribute to that goal in most sports. Only a very small minority of US high school athletes play at the college level, and even fewer are hired by a professional team. As a result, aiming for professional sports is an unrealistic and unreasonable goal for nearly all school-aged athletes. Basketball players even at the college level have only a 1% chance of joining a professional team. Alternatively, in the US, the family may hope that sports specialization will help the young athlete win an athletic scholarship. However, only 1% of US high school athletes win a sports scholarship.

The motivations for young athletes include believing what they have heard from adults about the necessity of early sports specialization, but they may also participate out of a desire to please these adults or be praised by them. Youth athletes in high school say they are also motivated by doing the sport they enjoy the most, that they are best at, and that they believe will win them a college scholarship.

== Effects ==
Playing a wide variety of sports improves the athlete's motor skills and athletic ability while reducing the risk of injury. Multi-sport participation can result in better strength, endurance and balance, which in turn results in fewer injuries, particularly of the knee and ankle. Specializing in a single sport, on the other hand, increases the risks for injury. The more severe the degree of specialization (e.g., quitting all other sports to train year-round in a single sport, versus playing one sport, but only for part of the year), the higher the risk of a severe overuse injury. Specializing in a single sport before puberty has the highest risks. In addition to specialization itself, intensive training programs carry their own risks. Teenagers who spend more than 16 hours per week in an organized training program are at the highest risk of injury.

Other effects of early sports specialization including burnout, worse athletic performance, loss of interest in sports, and quitting. There is research that also links early specialization to higher rates of anxiety and depression among youth athletes, especially when the amount of training is high and the time to rest is limited.

=== Injuries ===
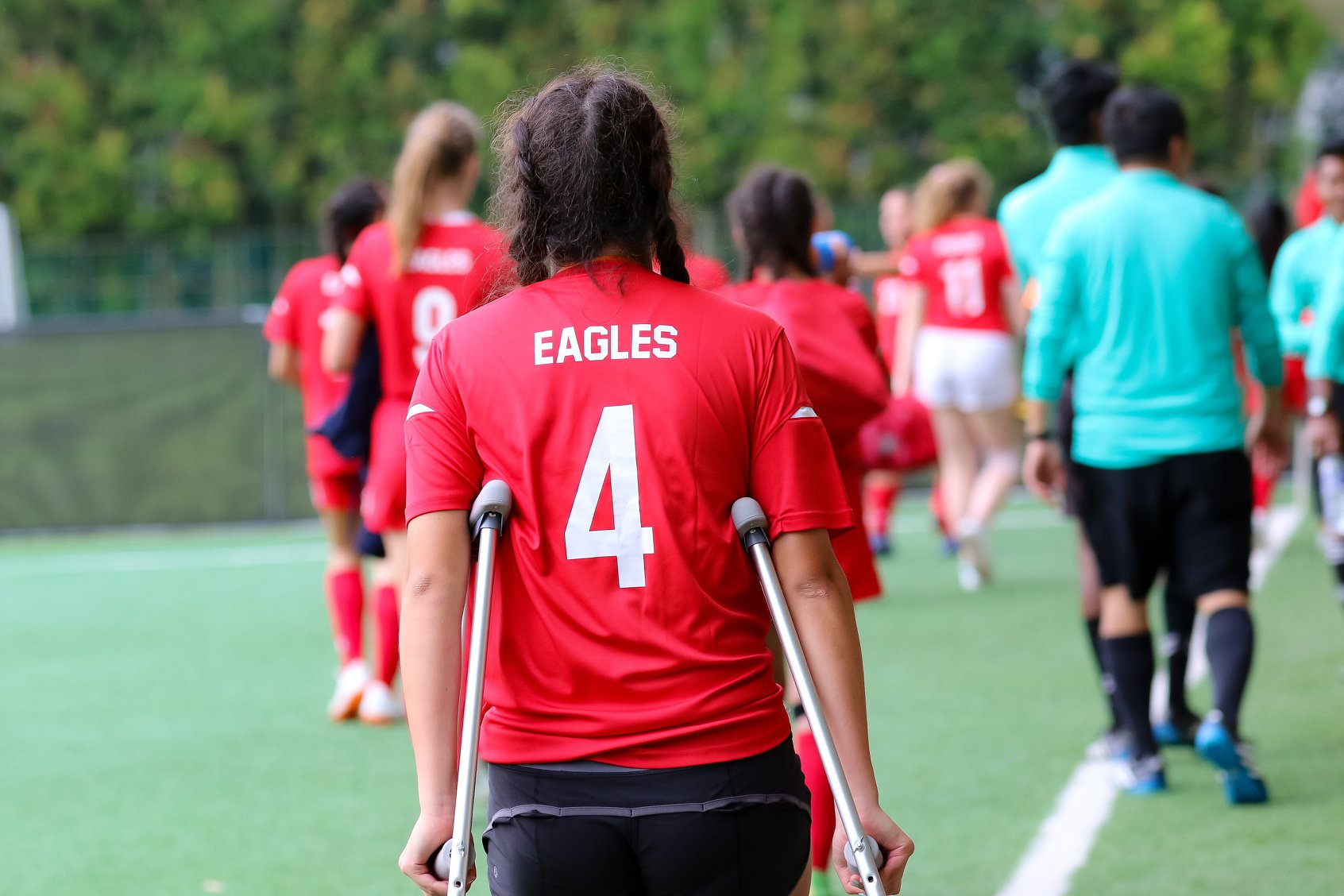
Overuse injuries are common among young athletes who specialize in a single sport year-round, or who engage in intensive training programs.

About half of sports injuries are preventable.

Overuse injuries are the most significant cause of sports injuries among young athletes. About half of athletic injuries in children and teenagers are overuse injuries. Early sports specialization is an independent risk factor for overuse injury. After controlling for the intensity of the program, young athletes who specialize in a single sport are more than twice as likely to sustain a serious overuse injury than similarly active multi-sport athletes. Additionally, many young athletes who are specializing in a single year-round sport are also in adult-directed intensive training programs, and these programs add to the risk of injury.

Another significant risk factor for overuse injury is the number of hours spent in practice, relative to other activities and the youth's age. To reduce this risk of injuries, a young athlete should spend at least one-third of their active time in free play, and the hours of organized sports time each week should not exceed the child's age. For example, for a 10-year-old athlete, the maximum amount of time spent in organized sporting activities (including all team practices and all games for all sports as well as all independent practice assigned by the coach or other adult) should not exceed a total of 10 hours per week, and the player should also spend a minimum of five hours per week in self-directed, freely chosen, independent play, such as climbing trees or playing with other children on a playground. Unstructured play time reduces the risk of injuries.

Injuries that are associated with early sports specialization include patellofemoral pain syndrome and anterior cruciate ligament injury.

Some injuries are sport-specific or action-specific. Too much overhead throwing is a particular concern. This can produce overuse injuries such as ulnar collateral ligament tears, ulnar neuritis, flexor-pronator tendinitis, apophysitis of the medial epicondyle, valgus extension overload syndrome, olecranon stress fractures, and osteochondritis dissecans. For example, baseball players who play year-round are at risk for Tommy John surgery (ulnar collateral ligament reconstruction). Early sports specialization in baseball is a risk factor for elbow injuries. Athletes who specialize young in baseball and play in the Southeastern Conference are more likely to have this surgery than professional pitchers for US Major League Baseball – who disproportionately come from the colder, northern climates, where they could not play baseball year round as children and teenagers. The number of pitches thrown is the most significant factor, outweighing even other important factors such as the type of pitch, using proper technique, and the player's physical condition. (Throwing curveballs, on the other hand, is not an important risk factor.) Early specialization in tennis seems to increase the risk of femoroacetabular impingement.

A particularly concerning injury category is disruption of the growth plate in the long bones. Injuries to the growth plate in children and teens can cause lifelong damage. Repetitive forceful throwing, which is seen not just in baseball and softball pitchers but also in javelin throwers and American football quarterbacks and others whose sport or role focuses on throwing, can develop damage to bones and growth plates. Many of these injuries are due to cumulative effects rather than a single event. Gymnast wrist is another example of an overuse injury that can damage growth plates. Even without damage to the growth plate itself, early sports specialization in impact sports may be driving an increase bone deformities. Young athletes' bones may not reach skeletal maturity until as late as age 22 in males, and the strong loads put on their more flexible bones through long hours of practice and intense competitions can result in problems such as cam deformities in the hips of American football players .

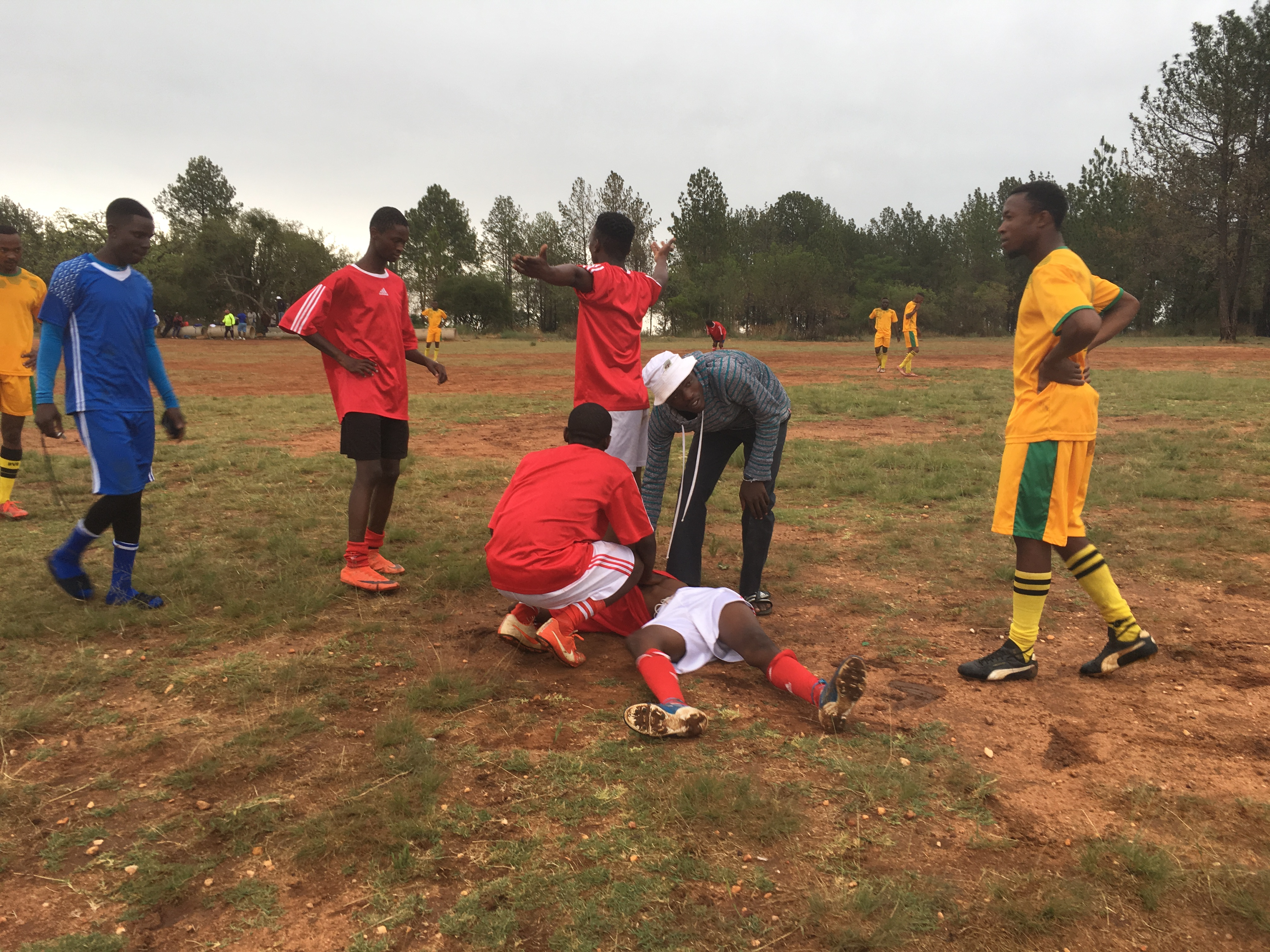
For most sports, injuries are more likely to happen during games than during practice.

About 20% of highly competitive young athletes quit because of an injury. Injuries are more likely during competitions than during practice. In addition to the physical impairment itself, injuries can damage the young athlete's mental health. They may become afraid of re-injury. The pressure to perform at high levels increases the risk of injury. Some coaching practices, such as punishing athletes who do not want to compete while injured, are abusive. In other cases, the young athletes' concern about missing the opportunity to show off in front of a scout causes them to balk at the necessary time for rest and recovery, and can push them into playing more intensively, which puts them at higher risk of an injury. Some sports, such as youth baseball, have recommended evidence-based limits on some activities, such as pitching, that are associated with overuse injuries. Year-round baseball is associated with a need for shoulder and elbow surgery.

=== Other physical effects ===
Other physical effects include:

- Changes related to physical growth: When youth athletes have growth spurts during puberty, they have a higher risk of injuries, including broken bones or a condition such as Osgood–Schlatter disease. A growth spurt can also cause temporary reduction in coordination, which can cause a young athlete to lose confidence and self-esteem.
- Uneven physical development: Early sports specialization often results in uneven neuromuscular development. Some motor skills will be advanced and others will be delayed.
- Female reproductive health: Female athletes are at risk of relative energy deficiency in sport, sometimes called the female athlete triad. They are at higher risk of delayed menarche (usually by one or two years), secondary amenorrhea, stress fractures, and lower bone density.

Time to rest is essential for youth athletes who have chronic medical conditions, such as asthma, anemia, or diabetes. Young athletes who are in a high-intensity program may also spend too little time sleeping, even if they are otherwise healthy.

=== Personal effects ===
The social, emotional, and mental effects include stress, losing interest in the sport, and an imbalanced lifestyle that has long-term consequences for the young athlete. For example, young athletes who are in a high-intensity program may also spend too little time doing schoolwork.

Although practice time as an older teenager or young adult is essential to high performance, intrinsic motivation (such as wanting to do something related to that sport on their own, even when nobody reminds them) and genuine enjoyment of the sport are also significant predictors of high achievement in sports. Early sports specialization reduces motivation and enjoyment, making it less likely that a promising child or younger teenager will become an elite athlete.

- Psychological stress: Coaches, parents, and sometimes the young athletes themselves may put unreasonable mental demands on the athletes. This may result in anxiety, depression, burnout, feelings of shame, perfectionism, and other mental health problems that it is not developmentally reasonable to expect the younger athlete to be able to manage independently. They may feel like they have no control. The stress of competitions can cause performance anxiety and can be overwhelming. Many young athletes who have specialized in a single sport and connected it to their personal identity, especially adolescent girls, are afraid of being rejected or criticized, and even well-intended criticism can feel like a personal rejection. Young athletes who feel pressured by their parents or stressed while participating are more likely to quit.
- Eating disorders: Eating disorders appear most often in athletes who have specialized in a sport with an aesthetic component (such as gymnastics), and they are most likely to appear around the time the athlete specializes in a single sport with a strong emphasis on competition.
- Emotional development: Early sports specialization, especially before puberty, is associated with emotional and developmental problems. Early sports specialization can displace age-appropriate play. Children who are put in intensive or competition-focused sports programs before puberty may be disadvantaged in negotiating the emotionally complex developmental stage of industry versus inferiority. They may become overly dependent on adults, which can put them at risk for physical, emotional, and sexual abuse. If they have constructed their personal identity around being an athlete, then being forced out of the sport can trigger depression.
- Social isolation: Young athletes may also have trouble forming and maintaining friendships with people who are not involved in the same activities. This can limit their social and emotional development, and if they have to stop participating (e.g., due to an injury), it can cause them to feel isolated. Multi-sport families are also more likely to have parents and children exercising together.
- Education: Youth who specialize do worse academically than those who do not play a year-round sport.
- Limited experience with other sports: Early sports specialization may keep children from finding a different sport that they like even better.

One survey indicated that most professional athletes do not want their own children to specialize in a single sport.

=== Performance effects ===
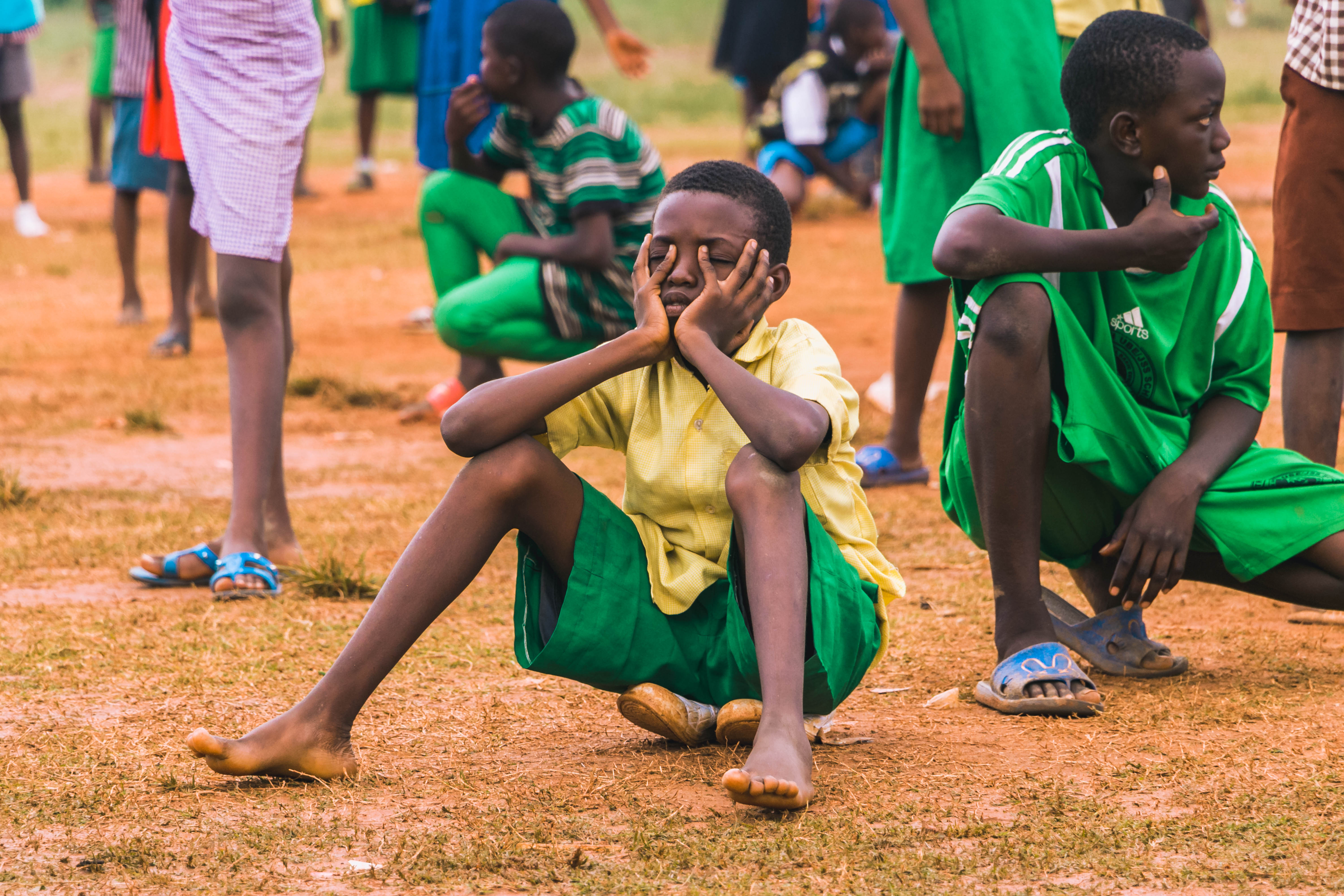
A child who is tired during free play will sit down to rest. During adult-directed sports activities, the child's need for rest may not be respected.

Early sports specialization may be more effective at producing athletes who peak at an early age. Adult elite athletes, such as competitors in the Olympic Games, are more likely to have joined a variety of sports teams when they were younger.

Early sports specialization frequently puts the youth athlete at risk for physical and mental burnout, which worsens performance. This can result in a vicious circle, in which the stressed athlete performs poorly, overtrains, feels more stressed, performs worse, and may even end up injured.

The training approaches and coaching practices that are common to or effective for elite adults are frequently ineffective for children and adolescents, especially when considered from a long-term perspective. Athletes who specialize in a single sport or are pushed into intense training are at high risk of quitting. The earlier they start playing, and the more time they put in during the early years, the more likely they are to quit. By contrast, children who have time for playing however they want and to organize their own pick-up games are less likely to quit organized sports. Quitting may also be precipitated by overtraining, which worsens performance, injuries, and psychological stress.

== High-risk sports ==
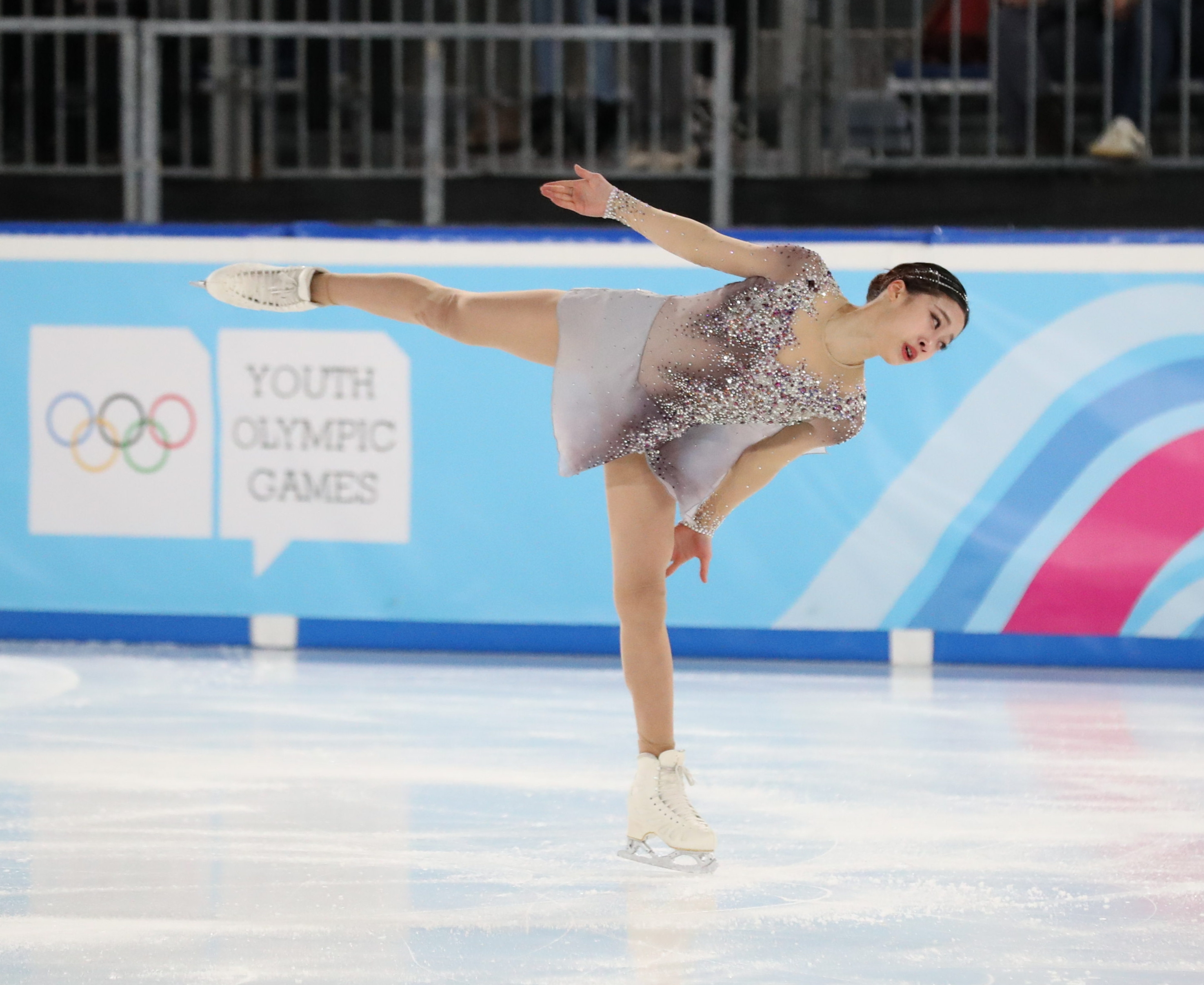
Elite figure skaters, such as You Young at the 2020 Winter Youth Olympics, often specialize in their sport from a young age.

There are a few sports in which intense training and early specialization are common. The highest rate of single-sport specialization is in tennis. These include women's gymnastics, figure skating, and diving, as well as dance, because they are highly technical sports, and because peak performance in these sports usually happens before the athlete matures into an adult body. Among elite college athletes, early sports specialization is uncommon overall, but it is somewhat more common among youth playing individual sports than team sports. Elite US college athletes in swimming, diving, tennis, and fencing tended to specialize around age 12, compared to age 15 for athletes who play team sports. Elite figure skaters also tend to specialize before the age of 10. At the other end of the spectrum, most athletes playing lacrosse, American football, and field hockey did not specialize in a single sport until age 17 or later.

Sports such as ice hockey, swimming, gymnastics, and baseball are high risk for causing overuse injuries in youth who specialize in them early. Sometimes an individual position, such as a baseball pitcher, may have higher risk than other positions due to highly specialized and repetitive training. Baseball pitchers tend to develop overuse injuries of the elbow (sometimes called Little League elbow) with the number of times they pitch the ball (including during practice), being tired or experiencing pain while pitching, and increased torque in the elbow all being risk factors for an injury. Some techniques, such as the kick serve in tennis, are high risk for causing injuries due to their biomechanics.

Sports that train every day of the week, that have sport-specific, technical training, or that have frequent, long, or intense competitions with young athletes – gymnastics and figure skating have all of these risk factors – are at particularly high risk for causing injuries. Training every day gives the body no time to rest and recover from minor strains. This is a risk factor for developing gymnast's wrist.

Tennis is a sport with early specialization and the risks that go with it, including promising young athletes dropping out. To reduce the number of young women who were quitting, the Women's Tennis Association banned competitions until age 14 and restricted the number of competitions a player could compete in before age 18.

== Health and safety guidelines ==
Early sports specialization is opposed by many sports and medical organizations, including the International Olympic Committee, the National Athletic Trainers' Association (NATA), the American Orthopaedic Society for Sports Medicine, the American Academy of Pediatrics, the American Medical Society for Sports Medicine, and the National Strength and Conditioning Association.

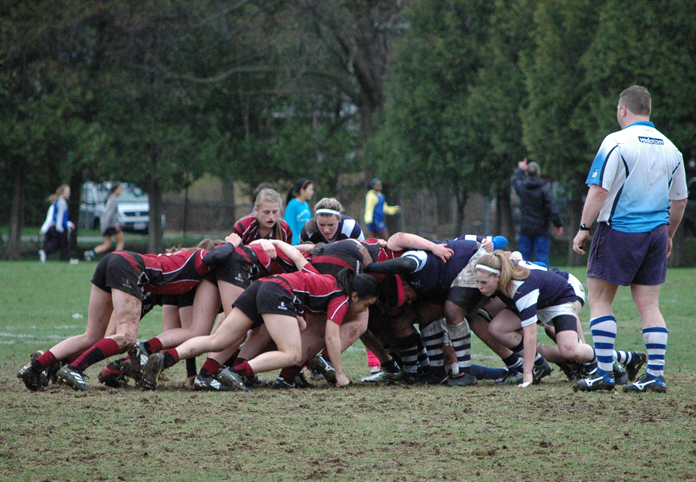
Sports medicine organizations recommend against playing sports that rely on static strength, such as rugby, until age 15.

The American Development Model, developed by the International Olympic Committee based on long-term athlete development principles, reserves high-performance work for athletes who are at least 15 years old. The International Olympic Committee encourages youth athletes not to specialize in a single sport until after puberty. They recommend that children and youth athletes participate in a variety of age-appropriate activities that will allow them to develop a wide range of athletic and social skills. The IOC also recommends that coaches be trained in evidence-based athletic development and that they strictly enforce a rule against young athletes competing with or training any injured body part or while experiencing pain. The Polish Society of Sports Medicine recommends that athletes not undertake serious endurance sports until age 13 and that athletes limit sports focused on static strength (e.g., rugby scrum) until age 15. The American Academy of Pediatrics recommends that no child specialize in a single sport before puberty.

Many groups discourage young athletes from participating in organized sports activities for more than a total of 16 hours per week, due to the high risk of injury. In some sports, the limit may need to be lower. NATA issued guidelines in 2019 recommending that children and teenagers limit the time spent on organized sports activities (including games and practice) to a weekly maximum of one hour per year old, e.g., 10 hours per week for 10 year olds and 15 hours per week for 15 year olds. Some programs are sport-specific. For example, USA Baseball developed the Pitch Smart educational program to reduce the risk of major injuries among children, and recommends that no youth baseball player pitch more than 100 innings per year (at a time when some players are pitching in 70 games per year), and that they take several months per year with no overhead throwing of any kind. FIFA produced the Marc11+ conditioning program to reduce youth injuries by promoting core strength and hamstring strength.

The American Academy of Pediatrics recommends that all youth athletes take one full month off from all organized sports activities at least three times per year, and taking one or two days away from organized sports activities every week. NATA's guidelines recommend that players invest at least four months per year out of organized sports activities, to recover from the unique physical stresses imposed by a given sport, placing a maximum limit of eight months participation in a year-round sports club. NATA additionally recommends that young athletes always have at least two days per week with no organized sports activities and that they take breaks during which the player is not participating in any organized sports. These breaks prevent injuries as well as physical and mental burnout.

NATA also recommends that youth play multiple sports during the year, instead of specializing in one, and that at any point in time they join no more than one sports team per season. (One team at a time, for a multi-sport athlete, might look like playing football in the fall, basketball in the winter, baseball in the spring, and then spending the summer playing outdoors.)

== See also ==
- Elena Mukhina, whose career-ending injury resulted in worldwide scrutiny of intense youth sports programs in 1980
- Yips, potentially dangerous performance problem which may be associated with stress
