= Physical literacy =

Ability to move with competence in physical activities

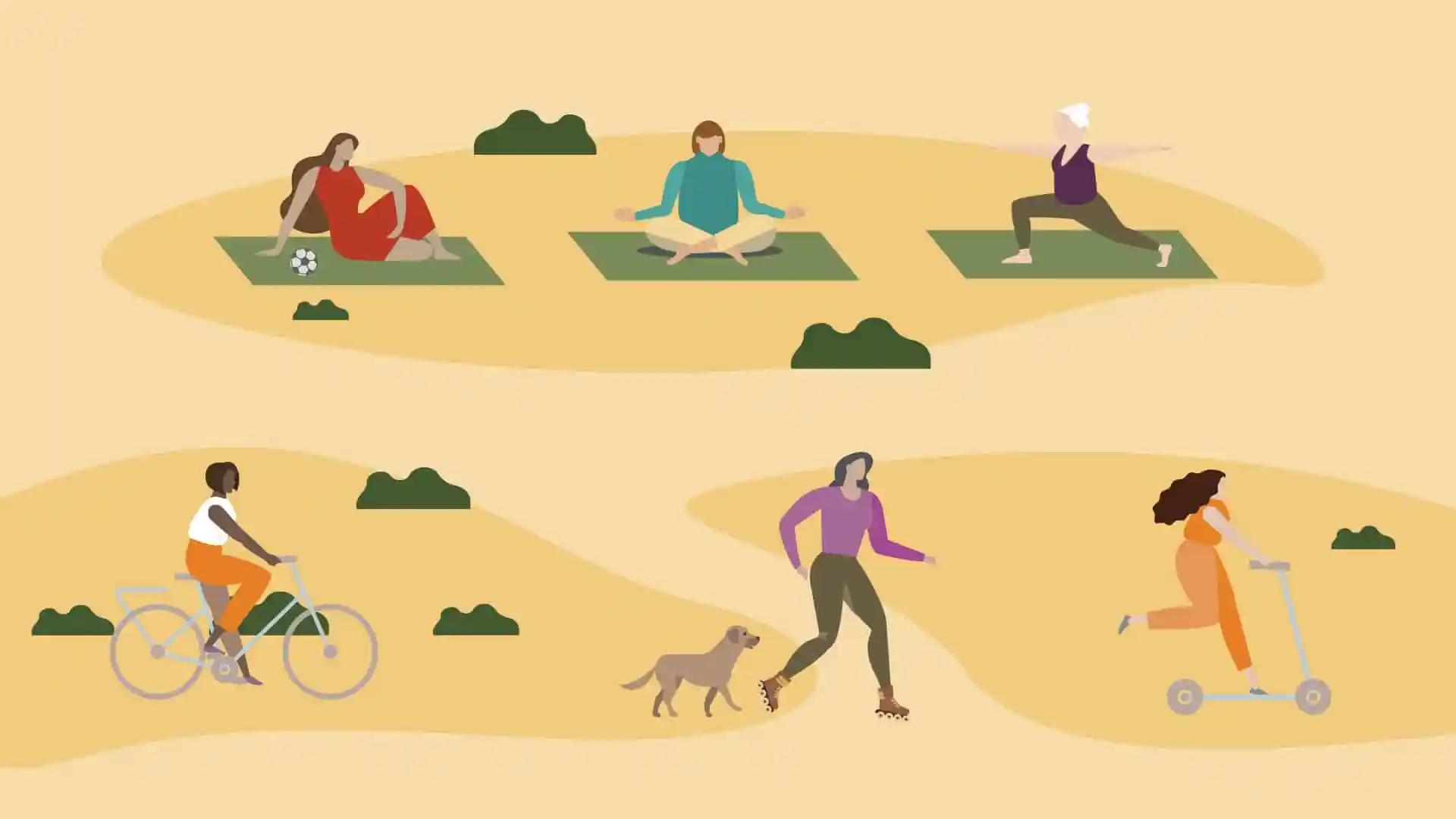
Physical Literacy Options

Physical literacy is the ability to move with competence and confidence in a wide variety of physical activities in multiple environments that benefit the healthy development of the whole person.

Importance of physical literacy for overall well-being:

1. Social
2. Aesthetic
3. Competition
4. Survival

Being able to be simply engaged in physical literacy allows a person to examine their own movements and in turn better performance and development.

The fundamental and significant aspects of physical literacy are:

- everyone can be physically literate as it is appropriate to each individual's endowment
- everyone's physical literacy journey is unique
- physical literacy is relevant and valuable at all stages and ages of life
- at the heart of the concept is the motivation and commitment to be active
- the disposition is evidenced by a love of being active, born out of the pleasure and satisfaction individuals experience in participation

Physical literacy is seen as a skill that is available and achievable for all. It involves a variety of experiences and develops from the day we are all born. Various advancements in physical literacy have shown the key aspects of being able to workout with confidence and competence while making physical literacy a daily practice and development.

== History ==
=== Margaret Whitehead ===
In 1993, Dr. Margaret Whitehead proposed the concept of Physical literacy at the International Association of Physical Education and Sport for Girls and Women Congress in Melbourne, Australia. From this research, the concept and definition of physical literacy was developed. In addition, the implications of physical literacy being the goal of all structures were drawn up.

Margaret Whitehead's framework formed around:

1. Being able to move and make a significant contribution to quality of life in the culture that we live in along while considering our own physical abilities
2. Using movement and confidence in physically challenging situations to adapt and anticipate.
3. Understanding of non-verbal communication and the ability to express oneself
4. Ability to identify and communicate with the elements that affect one's own performance, and understanding the framework of health in the aspects of exercise, sleep, and nutrition

=== Other Philosophical Roots ===
==== Monism ====
Rooted mainly in Gibs & Sartre in 2006, this philosophical theory views physical literacy as an appreciation of the individual as a holistic being viewing the body as an object—somewhat removed from the real person. This theory should be looking at teaching individuals from the point of a learner rather than working from a starting point of teaching an activity.

==== Existentialism ====
Originally founded by Levins, Lewotin, and Burkitt, this philosophical view looks at how learning should be seen as interaction with situations and settings with other people. The nature of the demands in terms of challenge and breath should match one's competence.

==== Phenomenology ====
This philosophy was mainly talked upon by Gallager who examined the reality of differences between learners. Each individual will see, appreciate and understand a situation or environment based on experience.

Three Main Considerations

1. Sensitive appreciation, respect
2. Experience should positively impact future perceptions
3. Evaluate the success of a lesson from the perspective of the individual's experiences

=== Modern Philosophy ===
Since 1993 to the present day, much has been done to advance physical literacy. Research has been conducted on Physical Literacy and presented at conferences around the world. In addition, the book Physical Literacy: throughout the life course was written and numerous conferences and workshops have been delivered, to train educators, parents, health practitioners, early childhood educators, coaches, and more. It is a novel name given to the concept of Physical Culture, known in Eastern European countries.

== Components of Physical Literacy ==
=== 1. Fundamental Movement Skills ===
This is the basis of movement and varies from movement patterns as this looks at the basis of skills and muscle memory. Most fundamental movement skills are considered as building blocks and are learned from a young age. Some of the main categories include;

- Balance Skills (body remains in one space)
- Locomotor Skills (running and jumping)
- Ball Skills (catching, throwing and kicking)

=== 2. Foundation Sport Skills ===
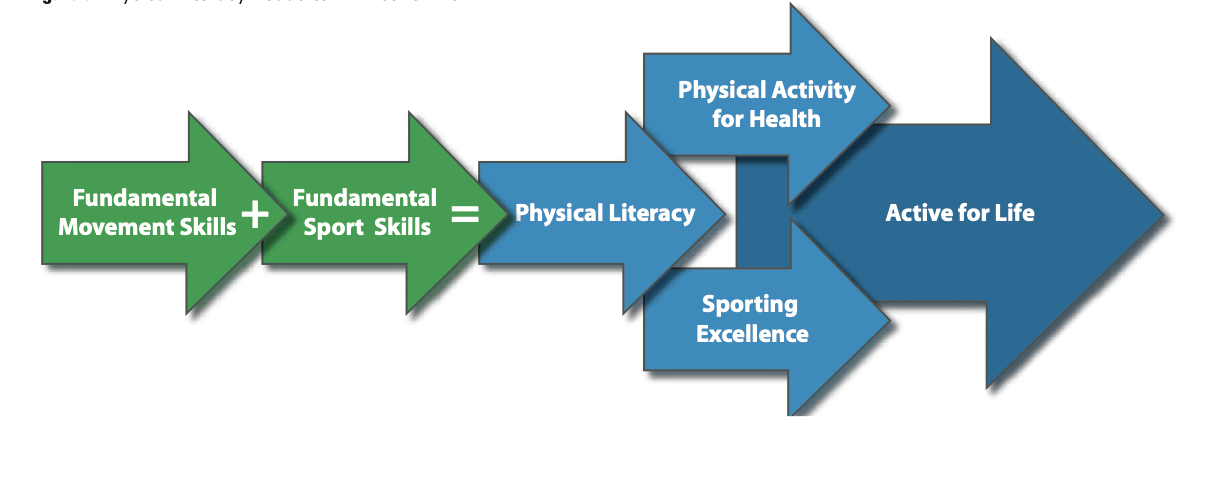
6 Elements of Physical Literacy Competence

There are a variety of movement patterns that can become more specialized to attend to specific sports and activities.

Some of the main categories include;

- Adventure
- Aesthetic
- Athletic
- Competitive
- Fitness and Health
- Interpersonal/Relational

Movement patterns:

- General Movement Patterns: sending, striking, and rotating
- Refined Movement Patterns: throwing, bowling, and shooting
- Specific Movement Patterns: spin bowling, penalty kick, and somersault

Movement patterns are more specific than movement skills and can relate to any sport and also develop from a young age.

The concept of physical literacy has been developed over many years. It is seen, by a growing number of people, as the goal of the school subject, physical education. However, whilst this is extremely relevant, it is important to recognize that physical literacy is not restricted to the school years – it is relevant throughout the life course. In this respect, six phases of physical literacy have been identified: infancy, childhood, adolescence, young adulthood, adulthood, and older adulthood.

Over the past few years, there has been considerable interest, worldwide, in the concept of physical literacy. In Great Britain, several local authorities have adopted it as an overall guiding principle for their work in school-based physical education. In countries such as Northern Ireland and Canada, physical literacy has been the focus of considerable rethinking in respect of children's physical development and has consequently been the inspiration behind the development of new programs. In India this principle has been adapted by Sportism for training the Indian kids on the basis of Physical literacy concepts.

However, there have been a number of interpretations of the concept that have moved away from the central tenets of physical literacy. For example, in some instances physical literacy has been the name given to a program of fundamental movement skills, implying that the concept is solely about the acquisition of physical competence. Other interpretations have focused on knowledge and understanding, particularly in the context of the game. Both these scenarios include elements of physical literacy but do not represent the whole story.

== Importance for Children's Development ==
=== Relationship to Physical Fitness ===
Physical Activity Engagement

1. Important to promote early and regular physical activity
2. Use strategies that are age dependent on promoting healthy lifestyles and habits

Knowledge and Understanding

1. Teaching health-related fitness concepts to kids from teachers and parents
2. Engaging in a conversation of anatomy and physiology

Motivation and Coaching

1. Implementing strategies that use psychological factors to influence physical activity and participation
2. Using strategies to build motivation and self confidence/competence

=== Developmental Stages of Physical Literacy ===
There are a variety of different stages and strategies for children to promote physical activity when referring to the ages of 0-14.

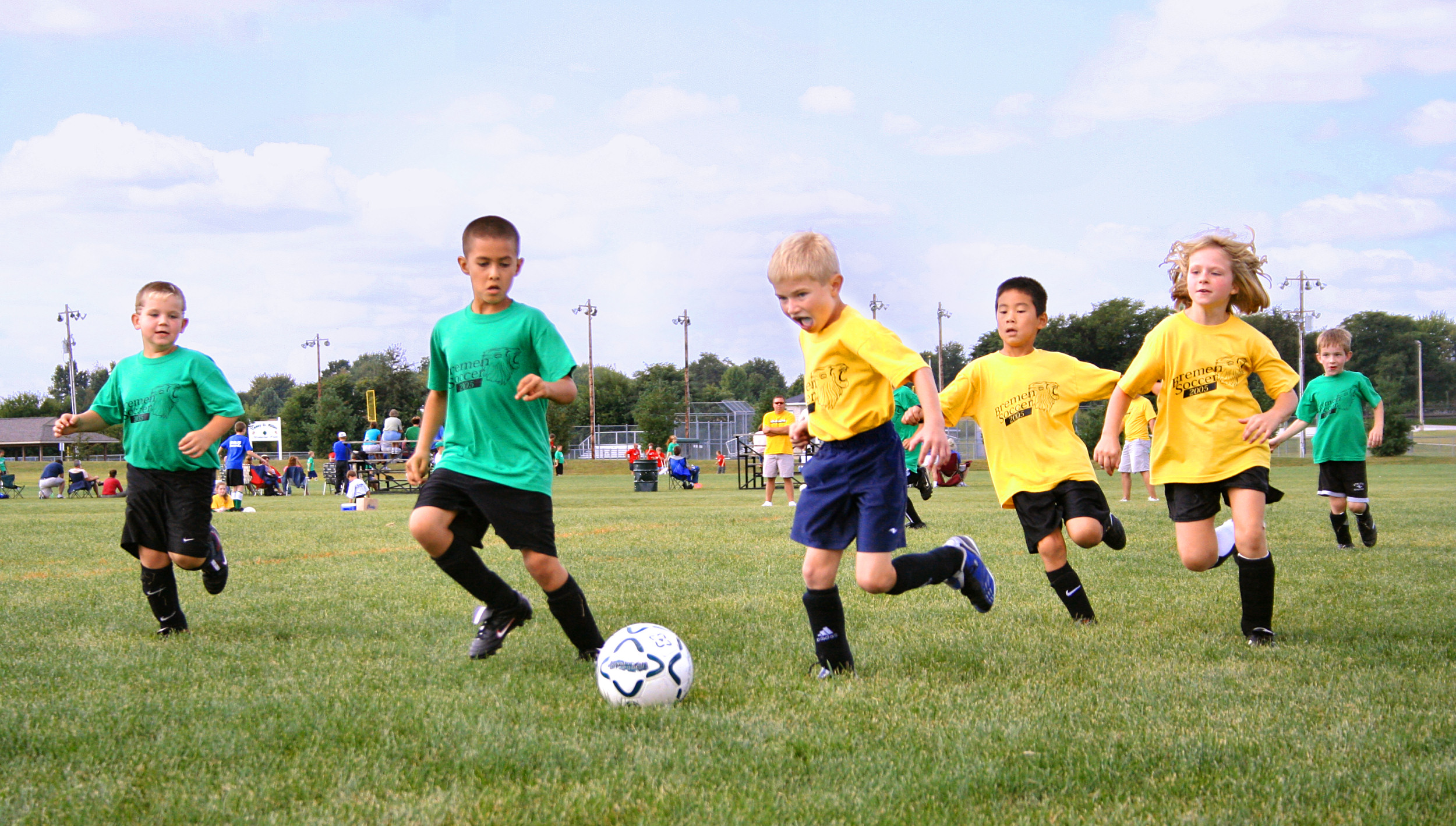
Youth Recreation and Sport

==== Early Childhood (0-5): Motor Skill Development Milestones ====
This section is focused on developing milestones for children that engages a new individual in fun and basic physical activity.

- Starting with basic fundamental movement skills
- Provide a couple of hours of active play per day
- Make play fun and integrate low-moderate fitness activities
- Enhances the development of brain function, coordination, social skills, and gross motor skills

During this stage, it is recommended to look at play-based activities. A child and toddler are more likely to enact activities into a daily routine if they believe it to be enjoyable and basic in terms of skill level and equipment required. It is recommended to have devices and accessories available at this stage for children with a disability to have additional mobility aids. It is also recommended to provide more fitness activities to those who have sensory disabilities as it can take longer to develop movement skills.

==== Childhood (6-12): Acquisition of Fundamental Movement Skills ====
A stage that is well structured focusing on agility, balance, coordination, speed, and rhythmic activities. Also known as the FUNdamental stage as children are looking to advance their skills in multiple sports and activities. Some of the main goals for this stage include:

- playing at least 2-3 different sports
- 70% practice and 30% games
- develop endurance
- keep sport fun and an encouraging activity at all times throughout the year

==== Adolescence (13-18): Refinement ====
Near this age, many of the habits and abilities have been developed at least on a basic level. Many children at this age will be in different skill levels depending on if they are "early" or "late" developers. Some key reminders at this stage include:

- balance between recreation, organized sports, physical education, and school sport
- develop habits for lifetime recreation through increased fundamental sports skills with greater ease and efficiency
- Stick to at least 60 minutes of moderate to vigorous physical activity

== Adults & Physical Literacy ==
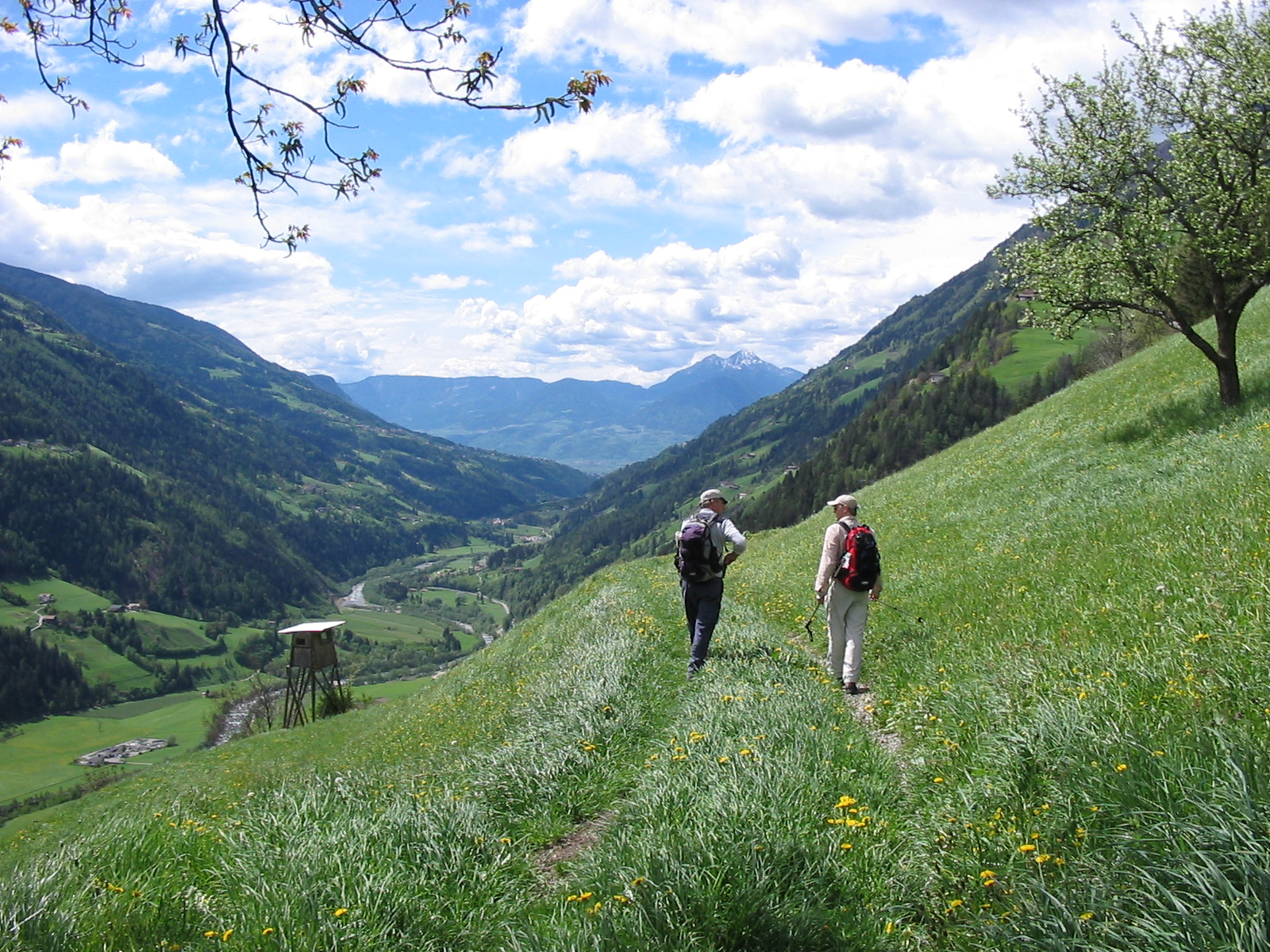
Physical Literacy in Adulthood

Developing strong physical activity habits during childhood is considered important for maintaining physical literacy into adulthood. Similarly to its recommendations for adolescents, the Government of Canada provides guidelines for maintaining physical literacy in adulthood.

- exercise at least 150 minutes per week
- moderate to vigorous activity

=== Benefits of Physical Literacy ===
Physical Health Benefits

- improve your ability to do everyday activities
- improve your cardiovascular ability

Cognitive Benefits

- reduce your risk of cognitive decline, including dementia

Social and Emotional Benefits

- decreases stress, anxiety, and fatigue
- Improves confidence and well-being

Long Term Implications

- improve muscular and cardiorespiratory fitness
- improve bone functional health
- reduce risk of hypertension, coronary heart disease, stroke, diabetes, cancer
- reduce the risk of falls and hip fractures
- help maintain body weight

== Attributes ==
A physically literate individual will display the following attributes:

- Physical literacy can be described as a disposition characterised by the motivation to capitalise on innate movement potential to make a significant contribution to the quality of life.
- All human beings exhibit this potential. However, its specific expression will depend on individuals' endowment in respect of all capabilities, significantly their movement potential, and will be particular to the culture in which they live.
- Individuals who are physically literate will move with poise, economy and confidence in a wide variety of physically challenging situations
- Physically literate individuals will be perceptive in 'reading' all aspects of the physical environment, anticipating movement needs or possibilities and responding appropriately to these with intelligence and imagination
- These individuals will have a well-established sense of self as embodied in the world. This, together with an articulate interaction with the environment, will engender positive self-esteem and self-confidence
- Sensitivity to and awareness of embodied capability will lead to fluent self-expression through non-verbal communication and to perceptive and empathetic interaction with others
- In addition, physically literate individuals will have the ability to identify and articulate the essential qualities that influence the effectiveness of their own movement performance, and will have an understanding of the principles of embodied health with respect to basic aspects such as exercise, sleep and nutrition
- Physically literate individuals, in addition to having the ability of performing various physical skills, sports movements with ease and poise, will also have the ability to use the body and body segments while carrying out the daily activities like sitting, sleeping, mounting steps, getting down from height, carrying weights etc. so that there will be no negative impact on the body alignment and spinal posture.

== Physical Literacy Worldwide ==
=== Canada ===
One element of physical literacy is the mastering of basic human movements, fundamental movement skills and fundamental sport skills that permit a child to read their environment and make appropriate decisions, allowing them to move confidently and with control in a wide range of physical activity situations. Physical literacy is the foundation of long-term participation and performance to the best of one's ability. Physical Literacy is the cornerstone of both participation and excellence in physical activity and sport. Ideally, physical literacy is developed prior to the adolescent growth spurt.

Fundamental Movement Skills and Fundamental Sport Skills

Fundamental movement skills play a significant role in a child's physical development. When a child is confident and competent in these skills, children can develop sport-specific and complex movement skills as well as enjoy a long life of physical activity. To become physically literate children need to master the 13 fundamental movement skills:

The Locomotor and Body Skills:

- Walking
- Running
- Balance
- Skating/Skiing
- Jumping
- Swimming
- Cycling
- Skipping

The Sending Skills

- Throwing
- Kicking
- Striking

The Receiving Skills

- Catching
- Trapping

The daily activities

- Sitting
- Sleeping posture
- Lifting weights properly
- Getting down from heights
- Mounting steps etc.

These skills can be developed through the four following activities: athletics, gymnastics, swimming, and skating, slip, and slide movements. Each skill will involve a series of developmental stages that the child will go through in order to master that particular skill. Fundamental Sport Skills involve using Fundamental Movement Skills in a sport specific setting (i.e. a child can kick a ball, this is a Fundamental Movement Skill; when she kicks a penalty kick in a soccer game, she has used this skill as a Fundamental Sport Skill, the skill of kicking a penalty kick). These skills should be introduced through fun and inclusive games and activities, providing children with positive physical activity experiences, further increasing their confidence, competence, and motivation to be active.

The Four Environments

To develop physical literacy children should learn fundamental movement skills and fundamental sport skills in each of the four basic environments:

1. On the ground: as the basis for most games, sport, dance and physical activities
2. In the water: as the basis for all aquatic activities
3. On snow and ice: as the basis for all winter sliding activities
4. In the air: basis for gymnastics, diving and other aerial activities

People with Disabilities

Everyone deserves the right to have opportunities to develop physical literacy. Although not all people with a disability will pursue physical activity or sport, they should still be provided with the same opportunities to learn fundamental movement skills, fundamental sport skills, and become active for life. There are both many opportunities and challenges that people with permanent disabilities experience in pursuing sport and physical activity. As a result, many resources have been created to support coaches, educators, recreation leaders, health practitioners, and parents in accommodating the needs of all participants to have increased physical activity and positive experiences.

== Promoting Physical Literacy ==
=== Educational Strategies in Schools ===
==== Integration into curriculum ====
As physical literacy is such a wide topic, and as such there are many ways that it can be incorporated into a schools curriculum. Broadly, physical literacy should be incorporated into curricula in a way that encourages knowledge and understanding of physical movement and activity, and its importance to physical health. Within this broad scope, there are four main principles that experts say should be covered:

1. A wide range of activities should be covered
2. The time given to a particular activity must be sufficient for meaningful learning to take place
3. Opportunities for participant choice should be available at some stage in schooling
4. Provision must be made for further involvement in extracurricular time, on site and off site.

==== Physical education programs ====
Physical literacy is a key piece of many physical education programs. Many current physical education programs only focus on one or two aspects of physical literacy, such as athletic development, community involvement, fundamental movement skills, or sport-specific skills.

=== Community-based initiatives ===
==== Sports leagues and clubs ====
Many sports leagues and clubs have started implement physical literacy plans into their training regimens. Physical literacy programs like CS4L, Skills 4 Sport, and Nike Designed to Move, are all geared towards sports clubs and provide assessment techniques, fundamental skills training, and more.

=== Family and parental involvement ===
==== Role of parents in promoting physical activity ====
Parents are very important role models when it comes to promoting activity for their children. The more active parents are, the more likely their kids are to be active as well. Parents also play the role of encouraging their kids to encourage and facilitate the participation of their kids in organized and unorganized sports and activities.

==== Creating supportive environments at home ====
Family-based activity goals have been shown to increase fitness and physical activity levels. This is especially true if fitness is not presented as the primary goal of the exercise.

== Assessment and Evaluation of Physical Literacy ==
=== Tools and measures for assessing physical literacy ===
Because of the unique nature of physical literacy, there are a number of different tools for tracking it. Many tools focus entirely on movement skills, which do not fully capture the scope of physical literacy. Effective assessments should include all of the main elements of physical literacy, including motivation, confidence, physical competence, and knowledge and understanding. Some of the best tools for charting physical literacy are listed below:

1. Canada's Passport for Life
2. Sport 4 Life's Physical Literacy Assessment for Youth (PLAY)
3. Canadian Assessment of Physical Literacy
4. Physical Literacy Environmental Assessment (PLEA)
5. Physical Literacy Observation Tool
6. Youth Sport Trust's Start to Move Program and Skills2Achieve
7. Society of Health and Physical Educators (SHAPE) America Standards

Each listed method of assessment and evaluation of physical literacy comes with its own benefits and drawbacks. As such, one should take into consideration what their specific needs and aims are in utilizing them.

=== Importance of ongoing evaluation and monitoring ===
Whichever method one chooses to monitor physical literacy, it is crucial to keep an ongoing record of evaluations. Keeping an ongoing record allows for the individual, or person tracking an individual, to watch their personal growth over their life, and allows for a holistic and reflective approach to ones physical literacy. This holistic approach encourages individuals to keep going by being able to look back at where they started, and track their progress along the way.

=== Incorporating physical literacy assessment into educational and healthcare settings ===
Incorporating physical literacy assessment into educational and healthcare settings has a number of benefits. By incorporating physical literacy assessment into educational settings not only benefits individuals motivation and confidence, but also encourages a lifelong active lifestyle. A benefit of incorporating physical literacy assessment into healthcare settings is financial savings; country's like Australia predict that the incorporation of physical literacy into their society will save their healthcare system billions of dollars in the future.

== Challenges and Barriers ==
=== Sedentary lifestyles and screen time ===
Screen time is becoming more common amongst children and adults, and it takes away valuable physical activity time. Unfortunately, it is becoming normal for parents to use screen time as a substitute for physical activity; this has been shown to have potential knock-on effects in lowering overall motor function and physical literacy. Sedentary lifestyles have also been shown to lead to a number of non-communicable diseases.

=== Socioeconomic disparities in access to physical activity opportunities ===
Another major barrier that is faced when trying to implement physical literacy are the socioeconomic disparities amongst families. Factors such as access to schools with robust physical education programs, to doctors that can effectively counsel on the detriments due to lack of physical literacy, and to environments that encourage physical literacy, all must be taken into account when enacting policies that promote physical literacy amongst diverse communities. When this is taken into account physical literacy can be used not only as a tool for health, but also as a tool for socioeconomic development.

=== Lack of awareness and understanding of physical literacy concept ===
A lack of awareness and understanding around the concept of physical literacy is something that can lead to major issues in the areas of implementation and evaluation of physical literacy. There have been documented issues of not focusing on the validity of content within certain physical literacy assessments. This kind of improper assessment can often be caused by a lack of understanding of physical literacy,

== Future Directions and Research ==
=== Emerging trends in physical literacy promotion ===
Physical literacy is becoming more relevant in today's society. Because of this major countries like Canada, Australia, the UK, and New Zealand have been investing hundreds of millions of dollars in programs that promote physical literacy through schools, community centres, and sports clubs.

=== Areas for further research and investigation ===
One area that some researchers are looking into is use of technology in the physical literacy assessments of the future. More specifically, the use of commercial motion capture technologies (e.g., Microsoft Kinect, Nintendo Wii, etc.) in the assessment of movements. These technologies are readily available and offer relatively cost-effective ways of detailed assessment in physical literacy initiatives.

=== Potential impact of technology on physical literacy initiatives ===
Constantly changing technology has the ability to improve physical literacy initiatives in many ways. By utilizing technology in physical literacy initiatives, it would be possible to provide feedback that is as personalized as possible to each individual. The use of technology has also been shown to increase the motivation and enjoyment of participants in physical literacy initiatives.

== Notable Organizations and Resources ==
=== International Physical Literacy Association (IPLA) ===
The IPLA is a UK based international organization with four key aims:

1. "Co-ordinate a networked community that encourages dialogue between practitioners, researchers, and policy makers to facilitate and support the adoption, evolution and promotion of physical literacy in communities worldwide."
2. "Encourage and support physical literacy research and development."
3. "Provide advocacy, policy and consultancy support to assist in incorporating physical literacy into communities worldwide."
4. "Develop and provide education and training that supports the adoption, evolution and promotion of physical literacy worldwide."

Their broader mission is to both promote physical literacy, and take steps towards helping communities adopt physical literacy across the world.

=== Sport for Life (S4L) ===
Sport for Life is a Canadian based organization that is recognized nationally. Their main efforts are centred around improving the physical literacy of governments, schools, institutions, and sports organizations, through promoting improved programming that will be beneficial to all members.
