= Steeden =

Australian sports equipment manufacturer

Steeden Sports
- Type: Subsidiary
- Industry: Sports equipment, textile
- Founded: 1958; 68 years ago
- Headquarters: Cheltenham, Victoria, Australia
- Area served: Worldwide
- Products: rugby balls, protective gear, teamwear
- Parent: Gray-Nicolls
- Website: www.steeden.com.au

Steeden Sports is an Australian sports equipment manufacturing company. The company is mostly known for its rugby league footballs. Steeden was established in Queensland in 1958, when twins Eric and Raymond Steeden opened a factory in Brisbane, Australia, producing leather cricket balls, rugby league balls and boxing bags. The company moved to New South Wales in the 1960s, and was acquired by British sporting goods corporation Grays International (marketed through its brand Gray-Nicolls) in 1995.

The company has a large range of rugby products that includes footballs, protective gear (shoulder pads, head protectors), clothing (uniforms), and accessories (bags). Steeden also produces netball uniforms.

== Overview ==
The Steeden name has become so synonymous with rugby league in Australia that it is often used as noun to describe the ball itself.

== Sponsorships ==
Steeden is the official ball supplier of the Rugby League World Cup since 2008.

It has supplied balls for the National Rugby League (NRL) since 1973 and will continue to do so through 2027.

The company is also the official ball supplier for the National Rugby League (NRL), Rugby League State of Origin, Australia Rugby League, New South Wales Rugby League, Queensland Rugby League, New Zealand Rugby League, European Rugby League, Australian Touch Association, The Betfred Super League, Betfred Championship and the Betfred League 1.

Steeden is also a partner of NRL teams Melbourne Storm, Penrith Panthers, South Sydney Rabbitohs and Wests Tigers

== See also ==
- List of fitness wear brands
- List of sporting goods manufacturers
- List of companies named after people
