= Gray-Nicolls =

British cricket equipment company

- Industry: Sport, textile
- Founded: 1855; 171 years ago
- Founders: H.J. Gray; L.J. Nicolls
- Headquarters: Robertsbridge, East Sussex, England
- Area served: Europe, Oceania, Asia
- Products: Cricket clothing and equipment, team uniforms, accessories
- Parent: Grays International
- Subsidiaries: Steeden
- Website: gray-nicolls.co.uk

Gray-Nicolls is an English cricket equipment and clothing brand and is a subsidiary of Grays International. Gray-Nicolls founded in 1855. Formed as a result of merger between two companies, Grays and Nicolls, the company is based in Robertsbridge, East Sussex.

Gray-Nicolls manufactures and commercialises a wide range of products for cricket equipment, such as bats, batting gloves, balls, pads, athletic shoes, team uniforms, and bags.

== History ==
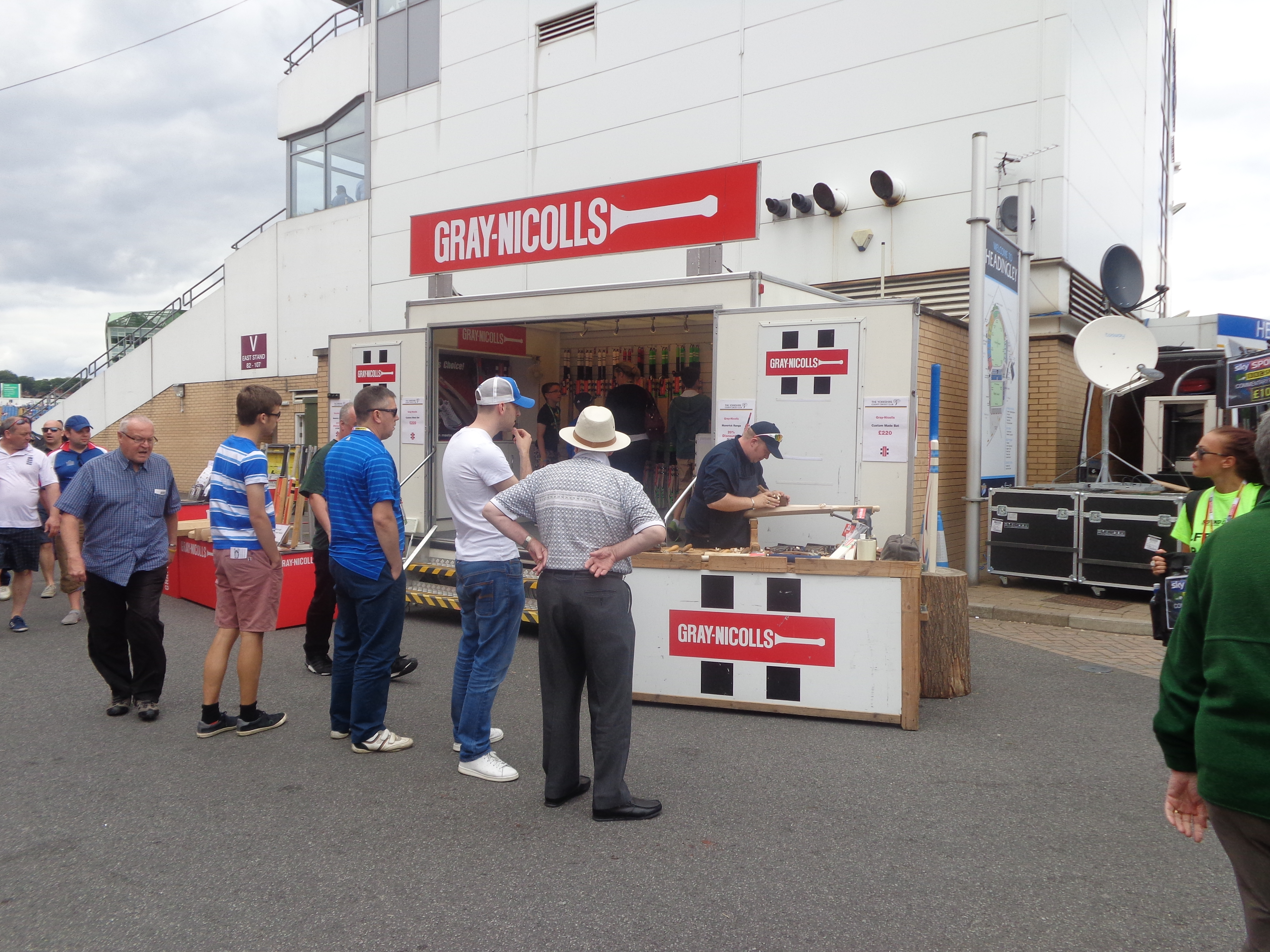
A Gray-Nicolls stand at Headingley Cricket Ground in 2014

The Gray company was founded as H.J. Gray and Sons by H.J. Gray in 1855. This company later began manufacturing cricket bats for leading Cambridge University cricketers such as Ranjitsinjhi and the then Prince of Wales and remained a family business. L.J. Nicolls started manufacturing cricket bats in 1876.

These two manufacturers merged in the early 1940s and thus Gray-Nicolls was formed. After World War II, famous cricket stars such as England Captain Wally Hammond and Australian all-rounder Keith Miller started to use Gray-Nicolls bats.

In 1974 the company introduced the 'scoop' bat, a revolutionary design at the time and sometimes named as cricket's most famous bat.

== Gray-Nicolls Athletes ==
Gray-Nicolls has had sponsorship deals with many leading international cricketers,

List of Athletes
Country	Athlete
Pakistan	Babar Azam
Pakistan	Mohammad Rizwan
Pakistan	Mohammad Yousuf
Pakistan	Shan Masood
Pakistan	Usama Mir
Pakistan	Saud Shakeel
Nepal	Kushal Bhurtel
India	Karun Nair
India	Manish Pandey
India	Priyank Panchal
India	Shreyas Gopal
India	Sunil Gavaskar
Sri Lanka	Charith Asalanka
Sri Lanka	Kusal Mendis
South Africa	Kyle Verreynne
South Africa	JP Duminy
South Africa	David Bedingham
South Africa	Kagiso Rabada
South Africa	Corbin Bosch
(Cricket West Indies) West Indies	Brian Lara
(Cricket West Indies) West Indies	Kraigg Braithwhaite
Zimbabwe	Brendan Taylor
Australia	Aaron Finch
Australia	David Warner
Australia	Annabel Sutherland
Australia	Ashton Turner
Australia	Ben Cutting
Australia	Mitchell Owen
Australia	Ben McDermott
Australia	Beth Mooney
Australia	Cameron Green
Australia	Jess Jonassen
Australia	Marcus Stoinis
Australia	Mitch Marsh
Australia	Shaun Marsh
Australia	Tahlia McGrath
Australia	Travis Head
England	Andrew Strauss
England	Alastair Cook
England	Chris Woakes
England	Harry Brook
England	James Anderson
England	Sam Billings
England	Ben Foakes
England	Maia Bouchier
England	Mike Atherton
England	Ollie Pope
England	Tammy Beaumont
England	Sophia Dunkley
England	Zak Crawley
(Netherlands) Netherland	Bas de Leede
New Zealand	Amelia Kerr
New Zealand	Daryl Mitchell
New Zealand	Henry Nicholls
New Zealand	Kane Williamson

=== National teams ===
- Netherlands
- Scotland

=== Clubs ===
- (England) Northamptonshire CCC
- (England) Central Sparks

== See also ==
- Grays International
