= Grays International =

British sports equipment company

Grays of Cambridge (International) Limited
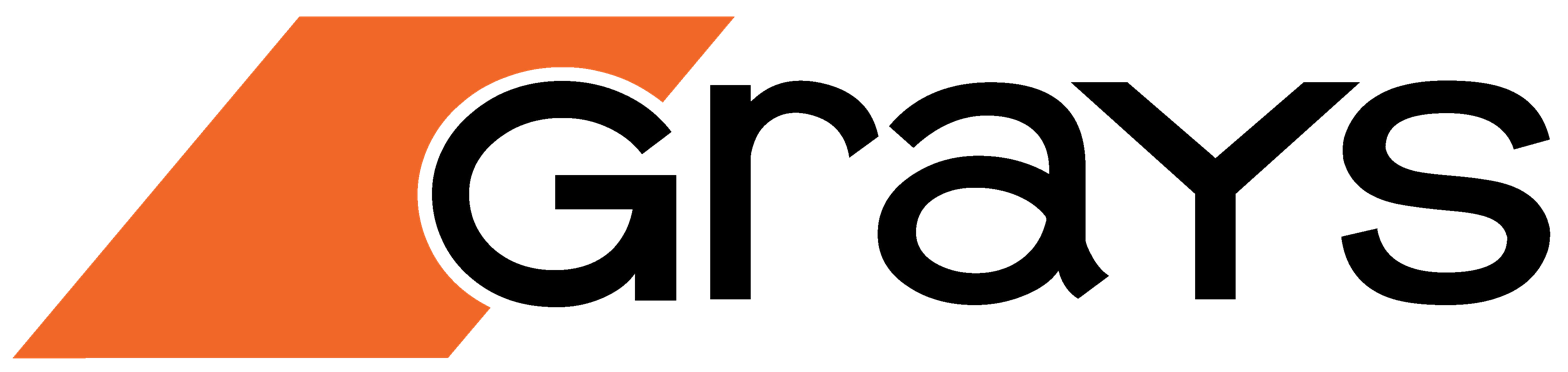
- Formerly: H.J. Gray & Sons
- Company type: Private
- Industry: Sport
- Founded: 1858; 168 years ago
- Founder: Henry John Gray
- Headquarters: Robertsbridge, East Sussex, England
- Area served: Worldwide
- Products: List: Cricket bats, balls, helmets, gloves, caps, leg pads, team uniforms, apparel, footwear; Field hockey sticks, bags, shoes, balls, activewear, team uniforms; Netball balls, teamwear, footwear; Rugby union balls, activewear, team uniforms, footwear, hoodies, jackets
- Brands: Gray-Nicolls; Gilbert Netball; Gilbert Rugby; Grays Hockey; Grays of Cambridge
- Website: grays-int.com

Grays International is an English sports equipment manufacturing company based in Robertsbridge, East Sussex. The company was founded in 1858 by Rackets champion H.J. Gray, producing equipment for cricket, field hockey, netball, rugby union and tennis, through its brands and subsidiaries.

It has a sister company, "Gray-Nicolls Sports Pty Ltd.", based in Cheltenham, Australia.

== History ==
In 1858 the company "H.J. Gray & Sons" was founded in Cambridge by Henry John "Harry" Gray, who started manufacturing wooden racquets for Cambridge students, among them Ranjitsinjhi, King Edward VII and King George VI. In 1940 Alison Gray merged the company with hockey stick manufacturer J. Hazells, to form Grays Hockey and also acquired the world-renowned cricket bat business of L.J. Nicolls, resulting in Gray-Nicolls.

The 1980s and 90s expansion meant Grays International had to move the headquarters to larger premises in Robertsbridge, a village in East Sussex, where it remains to this day. The company grew by expanding into clothing and footwear, and by acquisitions including the Gilbert Rugby brand, which doubled the size of the company in 2002. In 2019 the company resumed the manufacture of wooden lawn tennis racquets. It is still run by members of the Gray family.

== Brands and products ==
Each brand of Grays International is focused on one sport:

Brand	Sport	Products
Gray-Nicolls	Cricket	Bats, balls, helmets, gloves, caps, leg pads, team uniforms, apparel, footwear
Gilbert Netball	Netball	Balls, teamwear, footwear, apparel
Gilbert Rugby	Rugby union	Balls, team uniforms, shoulder pads, boots
Grays Hockey	Field hockey	Sticks, balls, team uniforms, footwear, accessories
Grays of Cambridge	Real Tennis, Rackets, Lawn Tennis	Wooden rackets
