= IRewind =

Video software company

- Founded: 2013
- Products: Video software
- Parent: Yoveo
- Website: irewind.com

iRewind is a technology company developing video software to deliver personalized movies for the sports industry. The start-up was acquired in 2017 by Zürich based company Yoveo.

== History ==
iRewind was founded in 2013 by six entrepreneurs: Bogdan Manoiu, Christian Mauriand, Salvador Garcia Zalduegui, Mihai Nicolescu, and David Delarive and became a "global leader in the personalized video industry for sports events", delivering over one million movies. The company obtained public attention in 2014, when it won both the Grand Prize of the Geneva Invention Show, the largest invention show in the world and the Swiss ICT Newcomer Award.
