= Protective gear in sports =

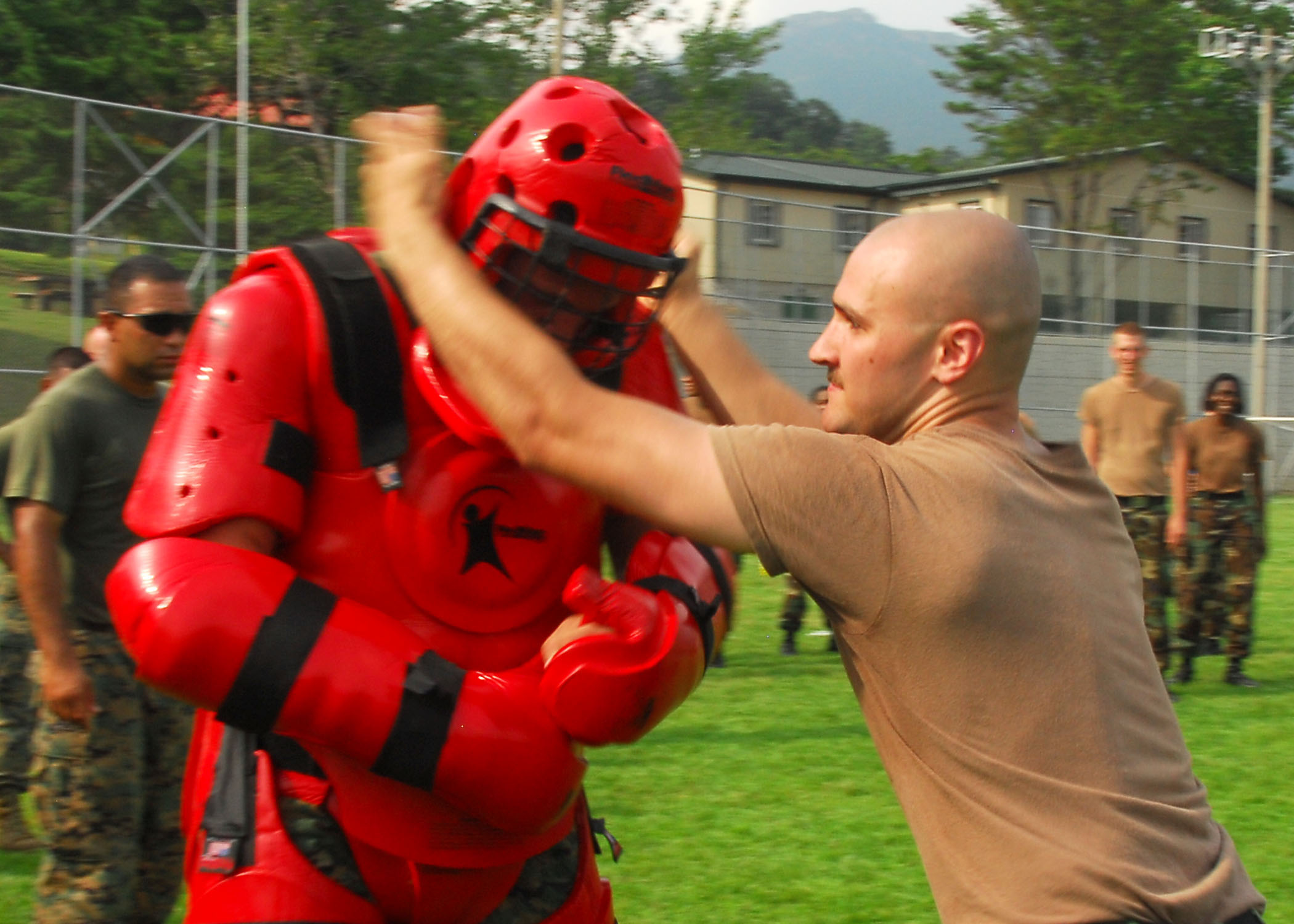
A maximum-safety protective gear for multiple sports training

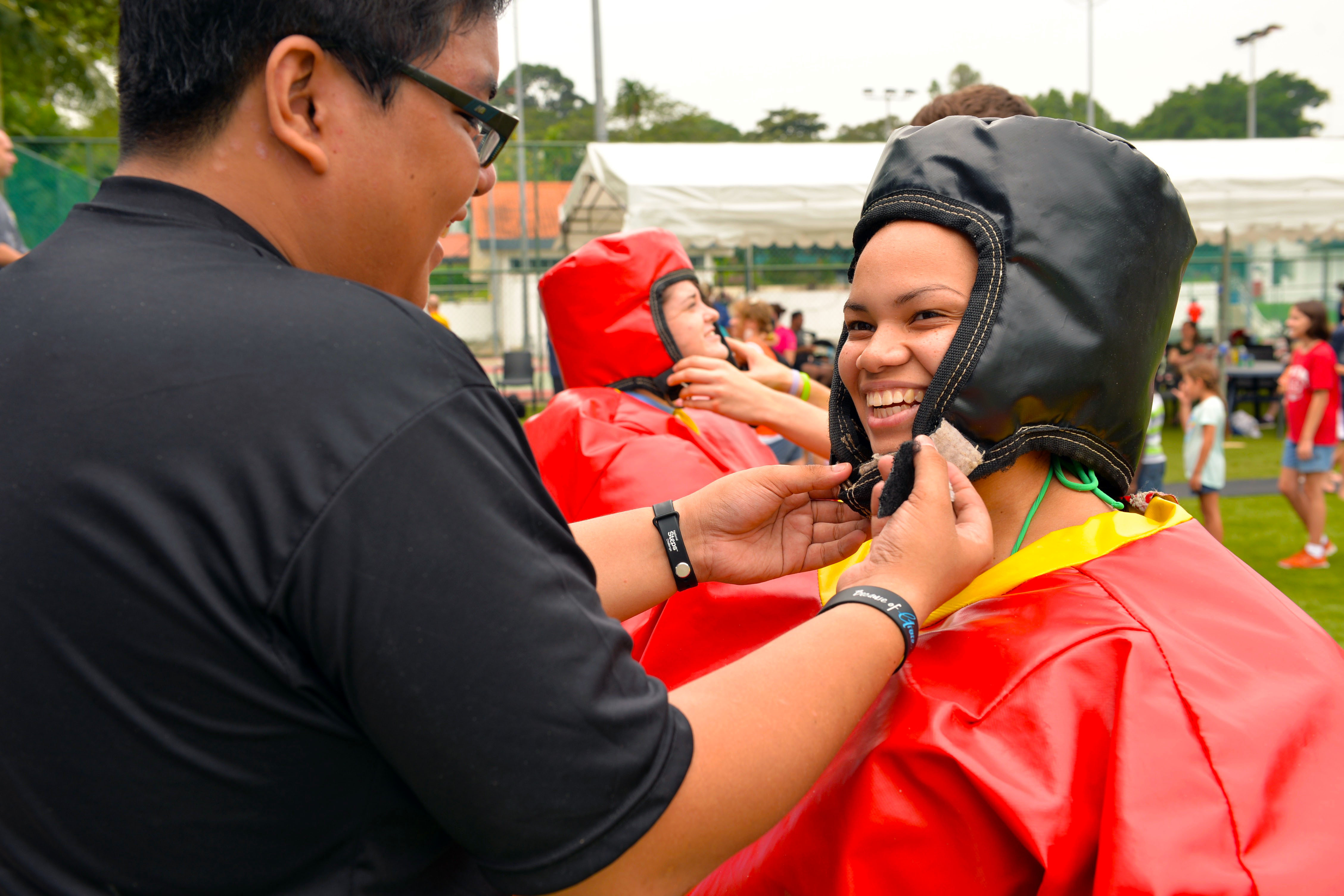
Soft-type equipment for family sports and weekend activities

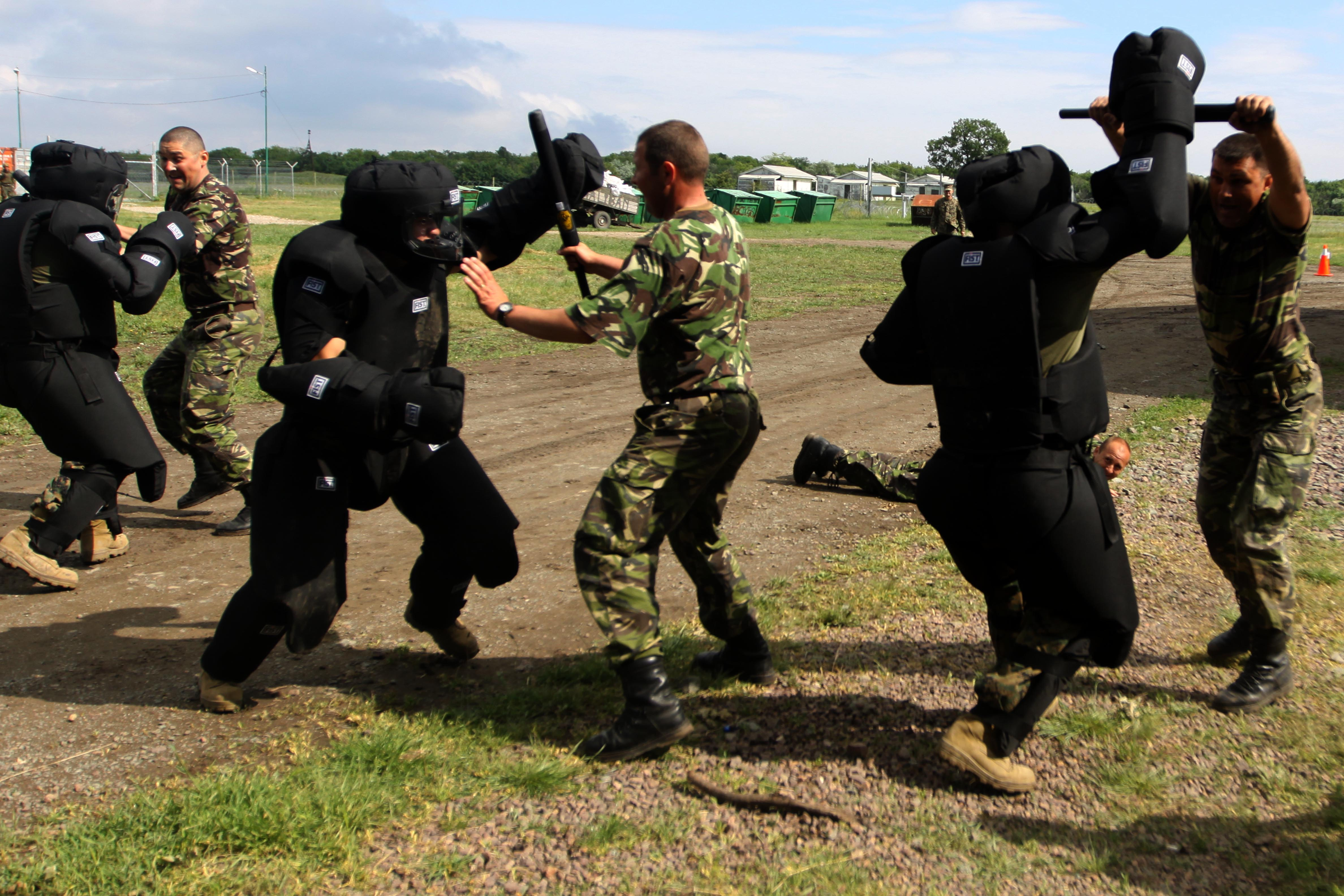
A full-body protective gear variant

Personal protective equipment serves an integral role in maintaining the safety of an athlete participating in a sport. The usage and development of protective gear in sports has evolved through time, and continues to advance over time. Many sports league or professional sports mandate the provision and usage of protective gear for athletes in the sport. Usage of protective gear is also mandated in college athletics and occasionally in amateur sports.

== American football ==
- football helmet
- eyeshield
- rib protector
- shoulder pads
- jockstrap with or without a cup pocket and protective cup
- hip, tail, thigh, knee pads
- mouthguard
- Gloves : Gloves can help a receiver keep his hands more warm and protected in poor weather.
- cleats/shoes

== Association football ==
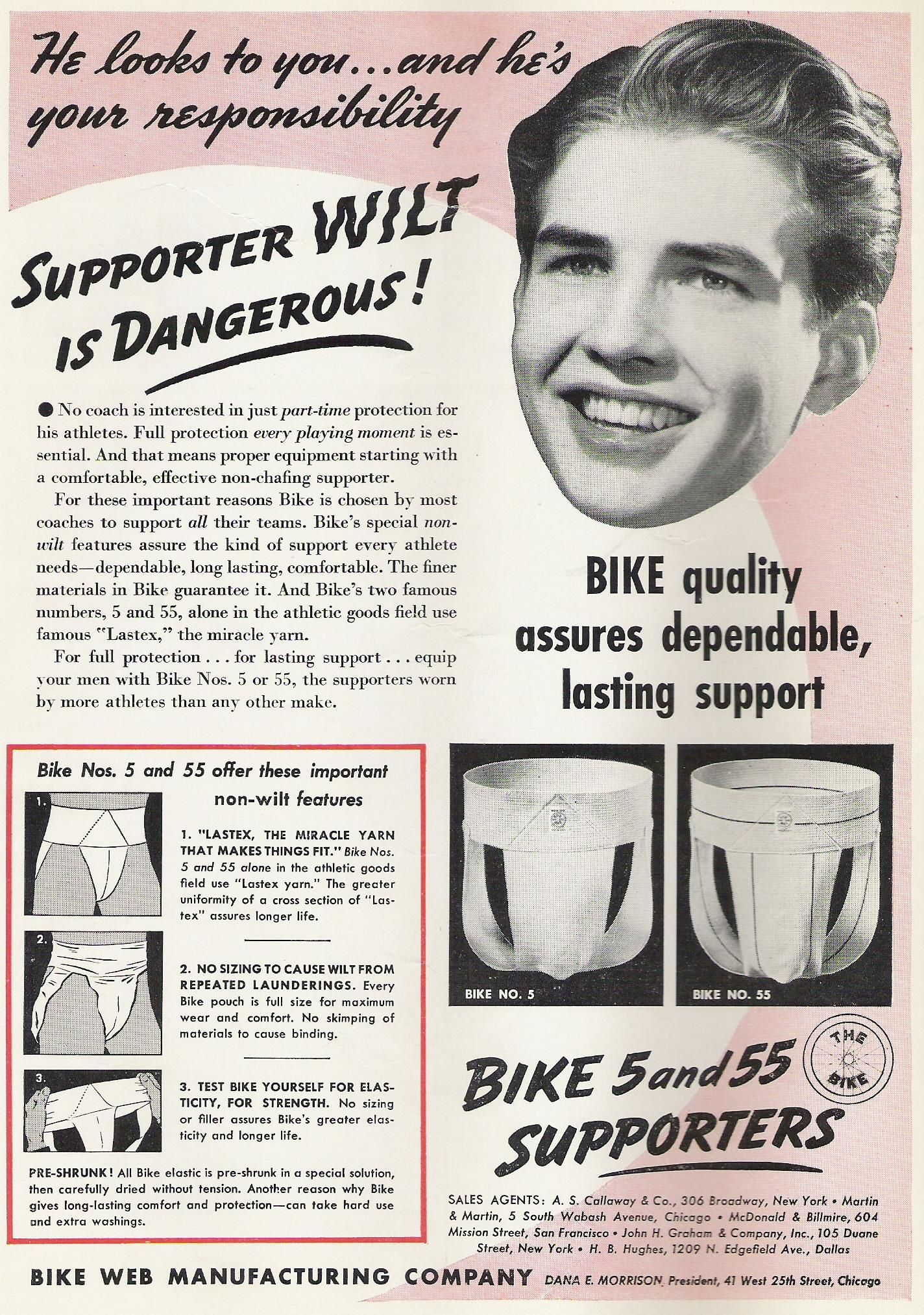
jock strap

- jockstrap with or without a cup pocket and protective cup
- shin guards

== Auto racing ==
- Racing helmet
- Fire suit
- Head and neck restraint

== Baseball ==
- batting helmet
- Gloves
- batting gloves
- cleats
- Shin, elbow, upper arm guards
- Hand and wrist guard for runners
- chest protectors, shin guards, and a helmet with a face mask for catchers
- jockstrap with a cup pocket and protective cup

== Basketball ==
- Protective sports glasses or sports goggles, which are also available with prescription lenses.
- jockstrap (optional)

== Bowling ==
- Bowling Gloves optional

== Cycling ==
- jockstrap (optional)
- jockstrap with a cup pocket and protective cup for mountain biking
- spandex shorts
- helmet

== Cricket ==
- Helmet
- Leg pads
- Arm guard
- Jockstrap with a cup pocket and protective cup
- Gloves (for batting and wicketkeeping)
- Thigh pad

== Extreme sports ==
- jockstrap with a cup pocket and protective cup
- Helmet
- Knee pad
- Elbow pad
- Wrist guard
- Mouthguard
- Shin guard
- Back protector

== Fencing ==
- Mask
- Jacket
- Chest Protector
- Plastron
- Breeches
- Glove
- Socks
- Foil
- jockstrap with a cup pocket and protective cup

== Figure skating ==
- pole harness

== Golf ==
- Clothes
- Club(s)
- Glove(s) (Not necessary and usually only worn on the opposite to dominant hand)
- Golf shoes
- Sun hat or visor
- Sunglasses (UV Protection)

== Gymnastics ==
- jockstrap
- Hand grips
- Wrist guard
- Chalk (Magnesium carbonate for grip)

== Field hockey ==
- shin guards
- mouthguard
- Helmet (Goalkeeper)
- Padding (Goalkeeper)
- jockstrap with a cup pocket and protective cup

== Horse racing ==
- Hat
- Body protector
- Boots
- Gloves
- Breeches
- Jockstrap
- Goggles

== Ice hockey ==
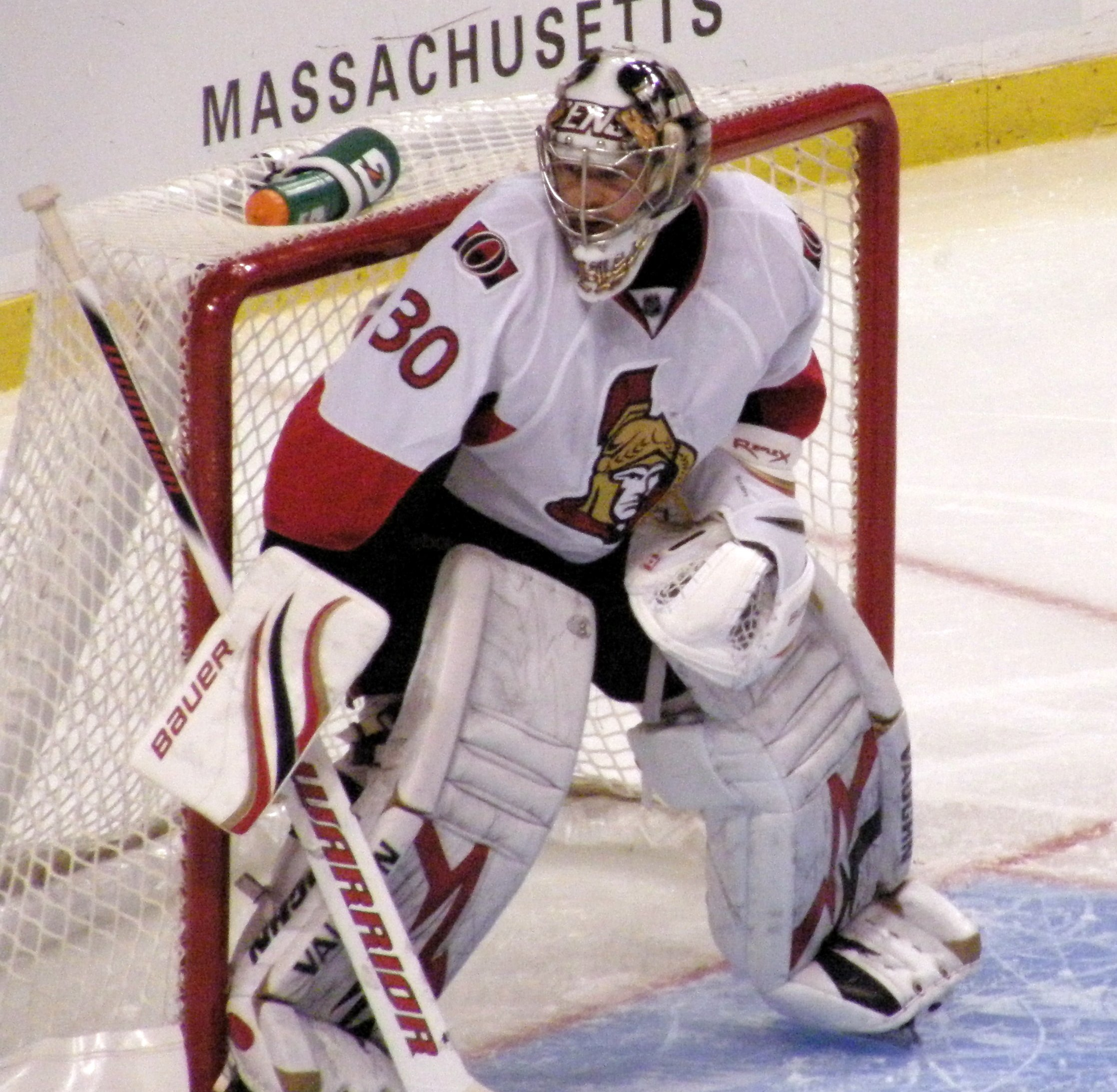
National Hockey League goaltender wearing the required PPE to play.

- Shin guards
- Mouthguard
- Helmet
- Shoulder pads
- Elbow pads
- Jock (males) or jill (females)
- Ice pants or protective girdle
- Neck guard
- Gloves
- Specialized protective equipment for goalkeepers (Mask, pants, chest protector, leg pads, skates with toe protection, blocker, catcher, hockey jock or jill)

== Martial arts ==
- jockstrap with a cup pocket and protective cup
- High Gear suit
- Compression shorts
- bandage
- Mouth guard

== Racquet sports ==
- jockstrap with a cup pocket and protective cup

In Squash: Goggles to protect the eyes from the ball

== Rugby union ==
All Optional:

- Mouthguard
- Underguards (pads)
- Headguard

== Underwater Hockey ==
- Helmet
- Gloves
- Mouthguard
- Twin-lens diving mask

== Volleyball ==
- Knee pads
- Elbow pads
- Palm guards
- Anklets
