= Hockey stick =

Stick used to propel the puck in hockey

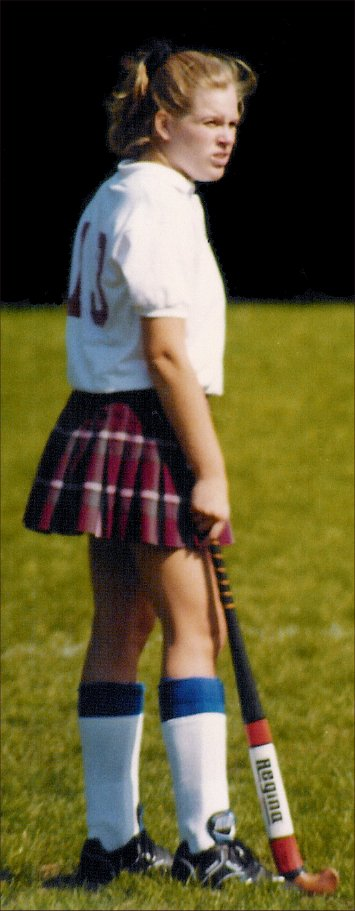
Girl with a field hockey stick

A hockey stick is a piece of sports equipment used by the players in all the forms of hockey to move the ball or puck (as appropriate to the type of hockey) either to push, pull, hit, strike, flick, steer, launch or stop the ball/puck during play with the objective being to move the ball/puck around the playing area using the stick, and then trying to score.

The word "stick" is a generic term for the equipment since different types of hockey require different forms and sizes to be effective. Field/ice/roller hockey all have a visually similar form of stick with a long shaft or handle which can be held with two hands, and a curved and flattened end; the end and curvature of these sticks are generally the most visible differences between the sticks for these sports. A modern underwater hockey stick bears little resemblance to any field/ice/roller hockey stick, since it is much smaller to enable it to be used exclusively in one hand, and it also has to be produced in one of two colours in order to identify which of the competing teams a player is playing for.

== Field hockey ==
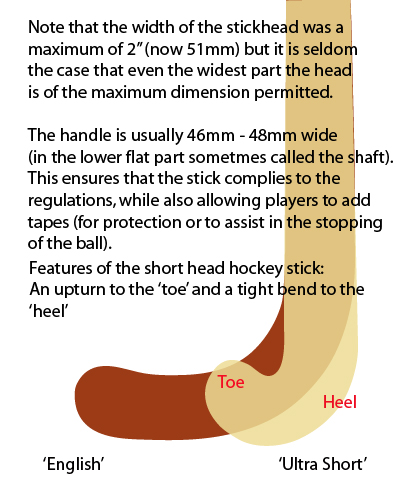
Field hockey stick

Field hockey sticks have an end that varies in shape, often depending on the player's position. In general, there are four main variations on the head:

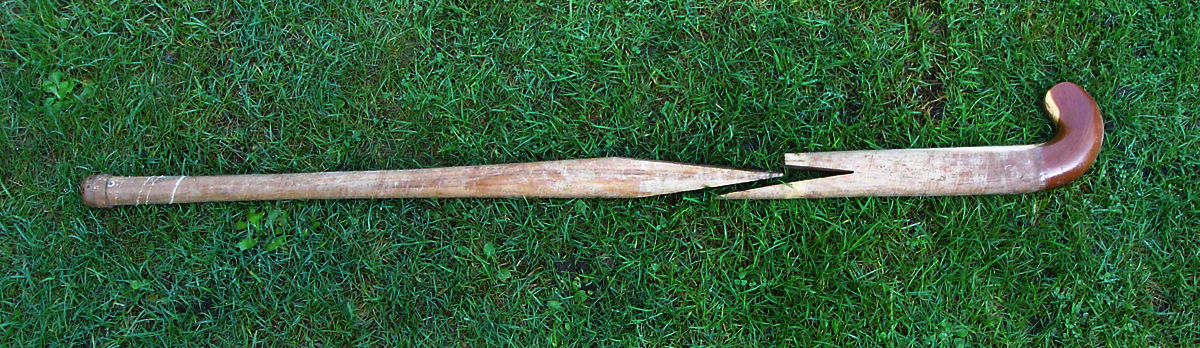
A broken wooden hockey stick without casing

The 'short' is mainly used by players wishing control over the ball, and increase their manoeuvrability. This specific head is most associated with the mid-field position.

The 'Midi' is used by players who will be hitting the ball often and need to be strong on their 'reverse side'. This specific head is most associated with the striker or 'up-front' position.

The 'Maxi' is similar to the 'Midi' as it has an increased surface area which is useful for hitting. However, its strength allows it to be used much more effectively for stopping the ball. This head is used by 'defenders' and 'attackers'.

The 'J Hook' again has a large surface area. However does not have the effectiveness of the 'Midi' for striking the ball, it has an increased thickness making it ideal for stopping the ball. This head is most commonly used by 'defenders'. Field hockey sticks vary widely in length and price, ranging from 26 in (660 mm) to 38.5 in (980 mm). The main brands of sticks include TK, Grays, Slazenger, Byte, Kookaburra, Malik, Dita, Voodoo, Adidas, Gryphon, Uber hockey, Woodworm, Brabo, Mercian, Mazon, Zoppo, Tempest, Matador, King Karachi, NedStar, The Indian Maharaja, Stag, Wasa, No Fear, BHP, Taurus, Wasp, Princess, IHSAN, Mohinder, Chryso, Piranha, Rage, Sachin and Edge.

The size of the stick that is most effective for a specific player is judged by that player's height. A 28 in (710 mm) stick would be used by a player under 4' most commonly, whereas a 38 in (970 mm) stick would be used mainly by players over 5 ft 10 in (1.78 m). However 'defenders' often like to have a longer stick than 'attackers' as this can be used for a greater reach when stopping a moving ball. The 'attackers' prefer a shorter stick as it allows greater control of the ball.

== Ice hockey ==
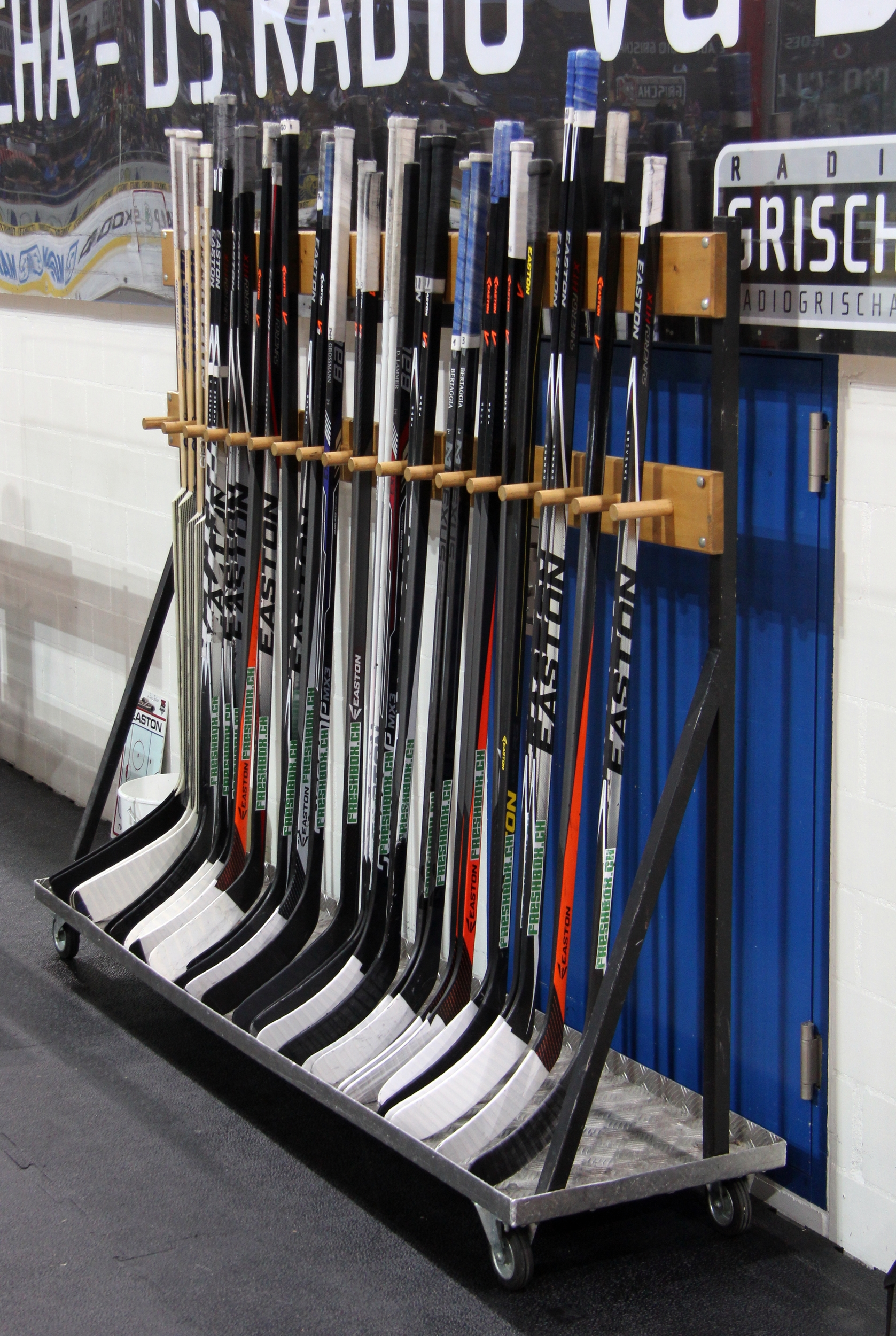
Ice hockey sticks on a shelf

Ice hockey sticks have traditionally been made from wood, but in recent years, sticks made of more expensive materials such as aluminum, aramid (brands Kevlar, Nomex, Twaron, etc.), fibreglass, carbon fibre, and other composite materials have become common. In addition to weighing less, composite sticks can be manufactured with more consistent flexibility properties than their wooden counterparts. They also do not have the natural variations that wooden sticks possess therefore a batch of the same sticks will all perform roughly the same. There were a few die-hard NHL professionals who still liked the feel of wood sticks as late as 2010, such as Paul Stastny, son of Hall-of-Famer Peter Šťastný. Some of these sticks have replaceable wood or composite blades, while others are one-piece sticks without a replaceable blade. Composite sticks, despite their greater expense, are now commonplace at nearly all competitive levels of the sport, including youth ice hockey. These new sticks are lighter and provide a quicker release of the puck, resulting in a harder, more accurate shot. Although the new materials do enable harder shots, the improved durability and lighter materials can make the transition from wooden to composite stick more difficult for less experienced players. A shortcut used by numerous players is to use a weighted system, such as kwik hands, to quickly adjust to the new sticks. More expensive ice hockey sticks usually are the lightest sticks on the market (390-470 grams in a senior stick). In addition to the increased torque that these composite sticks possess, the sticks do not warp or absorb moisture like their wooden counterparts.

When the player is standing on their skates with the stick upright, on the toe, perpendicular to the ice, the top of the shaft should stop just below or above the chin, depending on personal preference. Defense players tend to use longer sticks which provide greater reach when poke-checking.

Ice hockey sticks are also used in rinkball.

== Inline hockey ==
In the event of roller inline hockey, one-piece sticks are usually the same as ice hockey sticks. But when graphite shafts are used with replacement blades for these sticks, it is quite common for the replacement blades to be made of mainly fibreglass with a narrow wood core. Fibreglass shaves down over time on concrete, sport court and blacktop surfaces where traditional wooden ice hockey replacement blades are more likely to splinter, split and/or crack on those surfaces.

== Underwater hockey ==
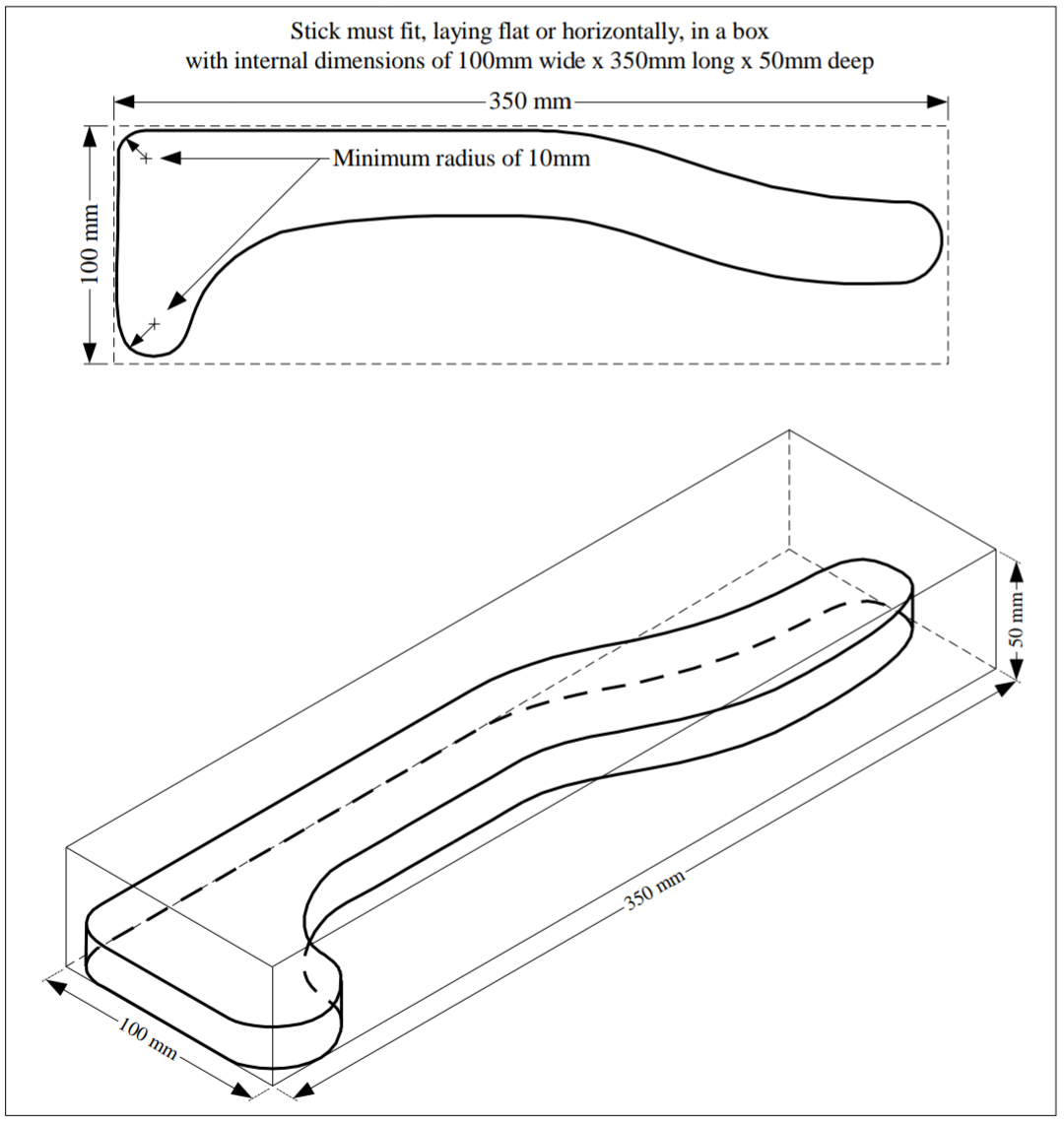
Drawing showing the maximum allowed dimensions of an underwater hockey stick (or pusher) according to the International Rules 10th Edition.

The stick (also referred to as a pusher) for underwater hockey is relatively short compared to that for field/ice/roller hockey, and should be coloured either white or black in its entirety to indicate the player's team. The shape of the stick can affect playing style and is often a very personal choice.

A wide variety of stick designs are allowed within the constraints of the rules of the game, the principal rule being that the stick must fit into a box of 100 mm × 50 mm × 350 mm (3.9 in × 2.0 in × 13.8 in) and that the stick must not be capable of surrounding the puck by any more than 50% of the puck's circumference, nor any part of the hand. A rule concerning the radiuses of projections and edges tries to address the risk that the stick might unintentionally become more of a weapon than a playing tool.

Construction materials may be of wood or plastics and current rules now supersede those that previously required sticks to be homogeneous, although they almost always are anyway. Many players of UWH manufacture their own sticks of wood to their preferred shape and style, although there are increasingly more mass-produced designs that suit the majority (such as Bentfish, Britbat, CanAm, Dorsal, Stingray etc.) which in most cases are made of a moulded nylon or PTFE, and many styles can be obtained to suit either handedness.

The rules allow for a symmetrical double-ended stick to be used, i.e. one that may be held in either the left or the right hand, and this can give ambidextrous players the opportunity to swap hands during play, although the rules are also very clear that the stick may be held in only one hand at a time.

Sticks in other hockey variants

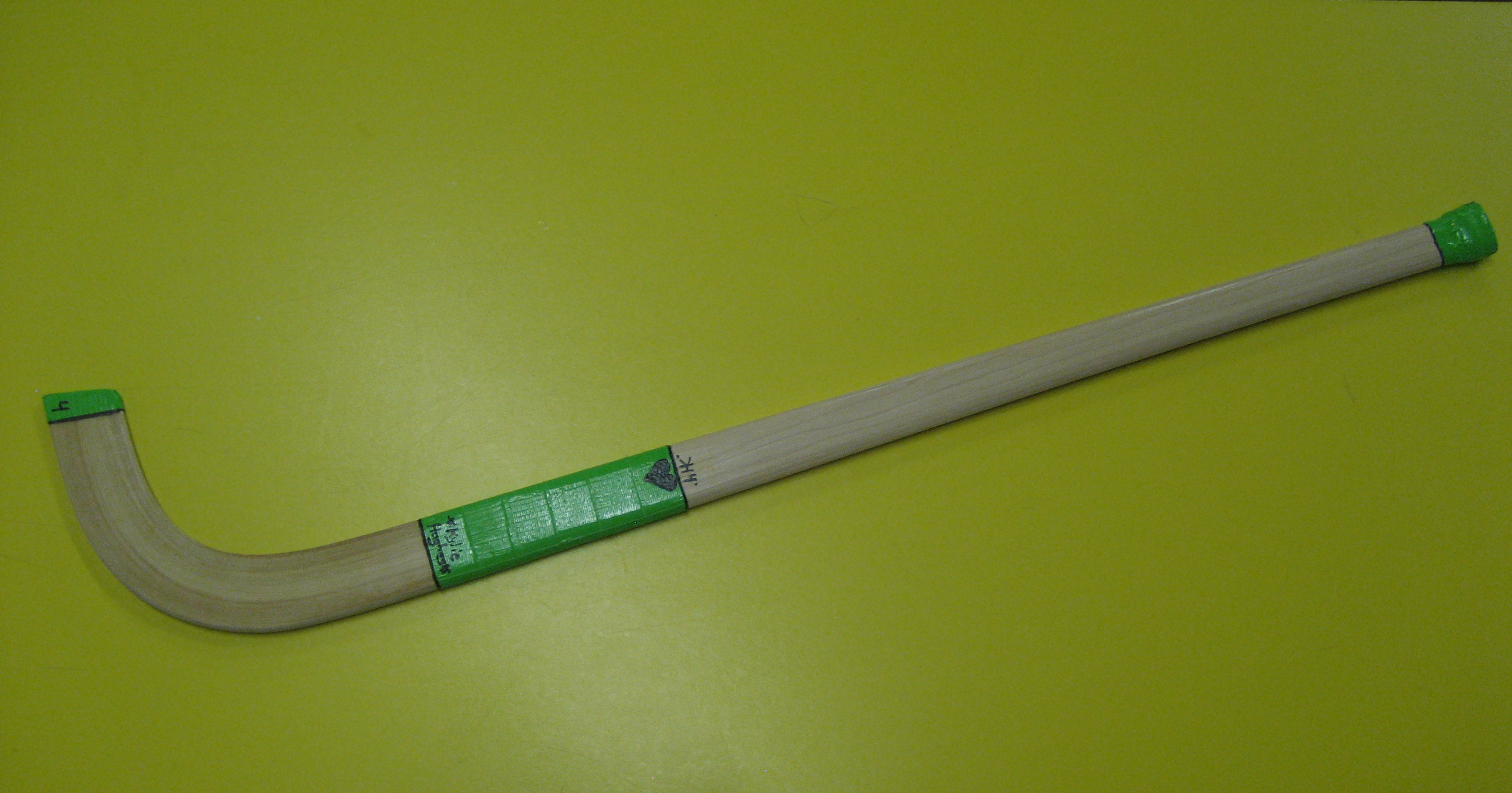
Quad roller

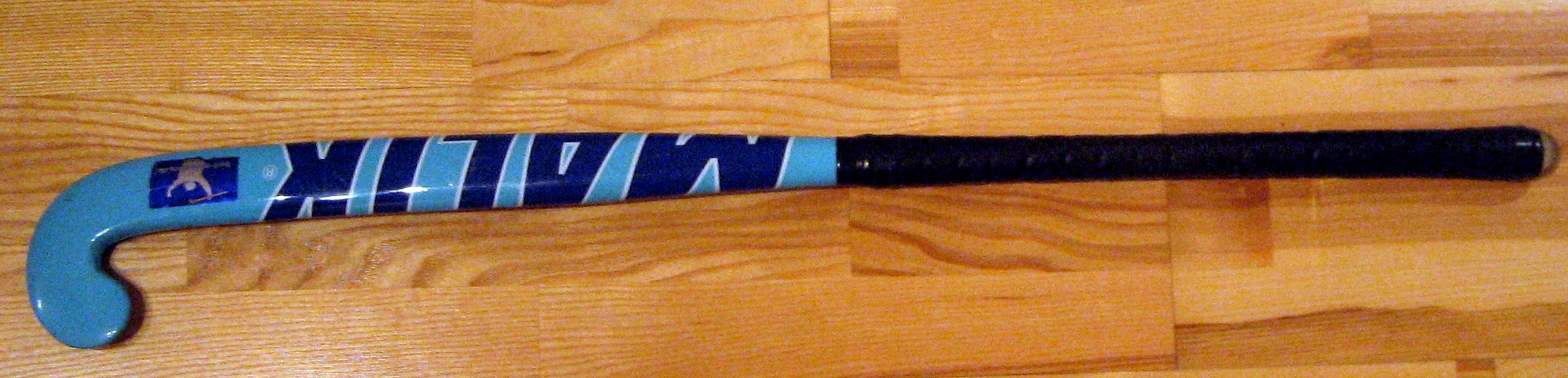
Indoor hockey

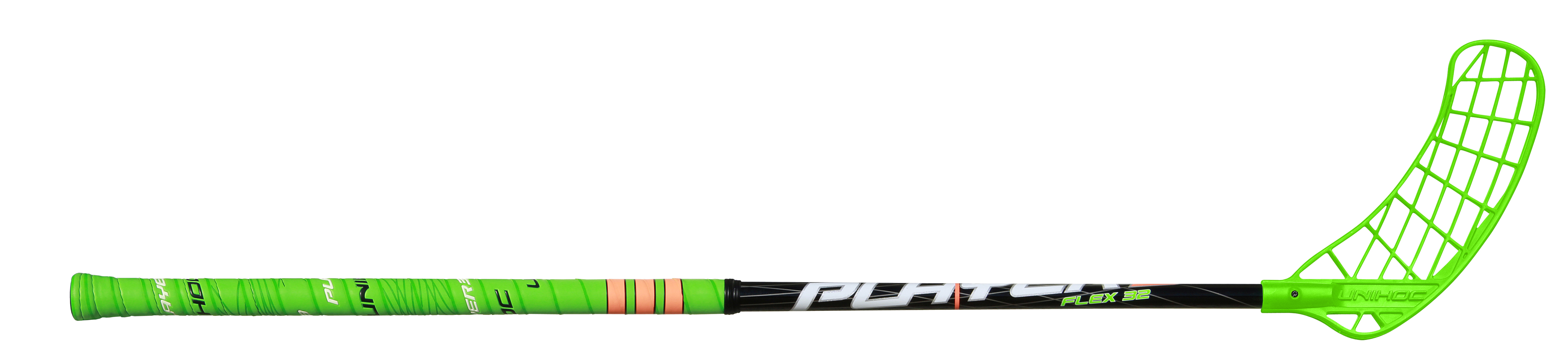
Floorball
