= Pads =

Leg protection used in sports

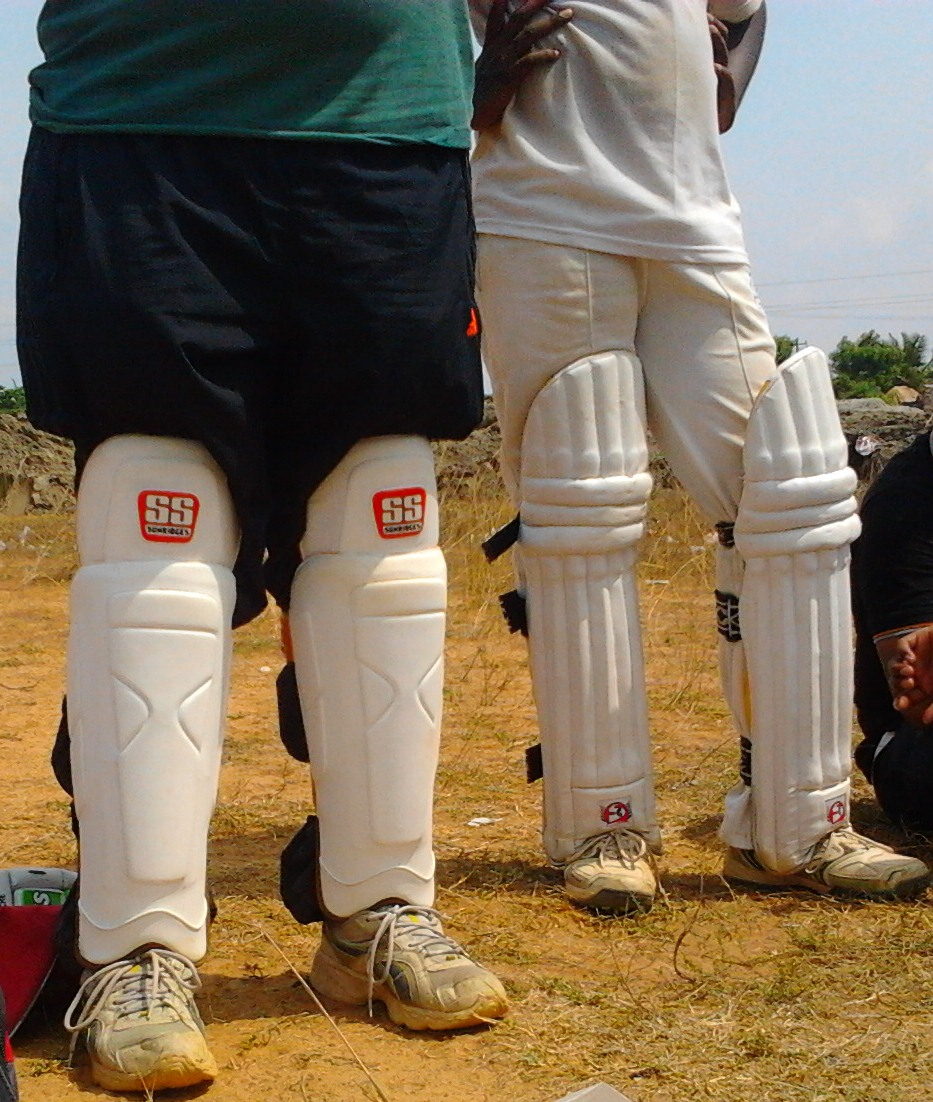
Pads used for wicketkeeping and batting in cricket.

Pads (also called leg guards) are a type of protective equipment used in a number of sports and serve to protect the legs from the impact of a hard ball, puck, or other object of play travelling at high speed which could otherwise cause injuries to the lower legs. These are used by batters in the sport of cricket, catchers in the sports of baseball and fastpitch softball, and by goaltenders in sports such as ice hockey, ringette, bandy, rinkball, field hockey, rink hockey and box lacrosse.

== Cricket ==
In cricket, pads fall into two types, batting pads and wicket-keeper's pads. In Test and first-class cricket, the pads are white (to match the rest of the player's whites), while in limited overs cricket they may be coloured to match the team uniform.

=== Batting ===
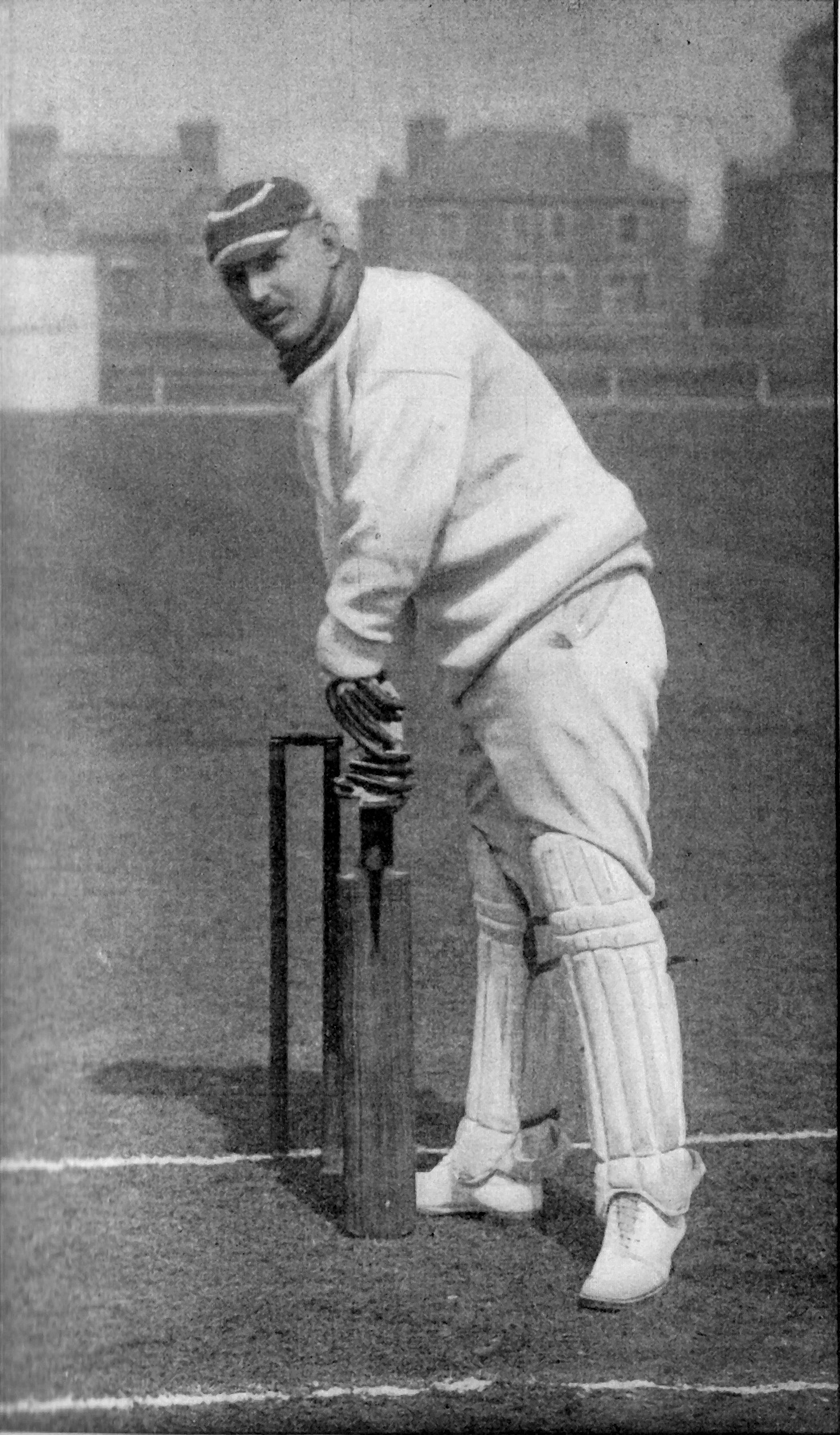
Arthur Shrewsbury (pictured in 1897) was a notable practitioner of using his pads to prevent the ball hitting his wicket

Cricket pads first appeared in the mid-18th century in England. They were developed to protect the lower part of the legs from the hard leather ball that was used to bowl deliveries in the game. This was in response to the gradual evolution from underarm to sidearm and finally overarm bowling, which endangered the batsman's knees and shins.

The development of pads led to a change in the Laws of Cricket with the addition of the dismissal for LBW. It was introduced in 1774 because batsmen had begun using their pads to deflect balls away from their wickets.

Batting pads protect the shins, knees and the lower thigh. At the base, there is a slot for the foot. Traditional pads were made from canvas which had cotton stuffing inserted between stitched-in cane wood strips that ran vertically up to the knee roll. The material would then be painted white with water-soluble canvas paint. Leather buckles were used to bind the pad to the leg. These natural material pads were quite heavy. By contrast, modern day pads are now made from durable and ultra light synthetic materials such as PVC for the outer and polyesters for the lining. Most pads use three velcro fastening straps making them easily adjustable and removable.

Batting pads are just one of the several protective layers worn by modern-day cricketers while batting. Other pads on the legs include a special knee roll to protect the knees or a thigh pad to protect the upper region of the leg. Within the professional game, players often insert extra padding beneath their pads to limit the impact from fast deliveries which can range in speed from 80 to 100 miles per hour (130 to 160 km/h).

=== Wicketkeeping ===
Originally, wicket-keepers used batting pads to protect their legs, but found the knee-protecting flaps interfered with their agility and ability to catch. There were also incidents where the ball lodged in the space between the flap and the wicket-keeper's leg. Modern wicket-keeper's pads are therefore smaller than batting pads, with insignificant knee flaps. Instead of three straps, these modern wicketkeeping pads have two straps: one at the bottom and the other one just below the knees.

== Other uses ==
In stick-and-ball games, players that are exposed to the delivery of fast, hard balls to their legs, arms or body wear pads to protect themselves. The protective wear has led to changes in tactics that would otherwise be impossible without safety equipment.

=== Baseball and Softball ===
Leg Guards are an integral piece of equipment for Catchers playing both Baseball and Softball. They are designed to protect the Catcher's knees, shins, ankles, and the top areas of their feet from injury due to balls in the dirt and foul tips, and from general discomfort caused by constantly moving from a crouch to a blocking position throughout the game. Leg Guards are typically made out of some form of thick plastic with a harness system to keep them attached and in place.

=== Ice hockey ===
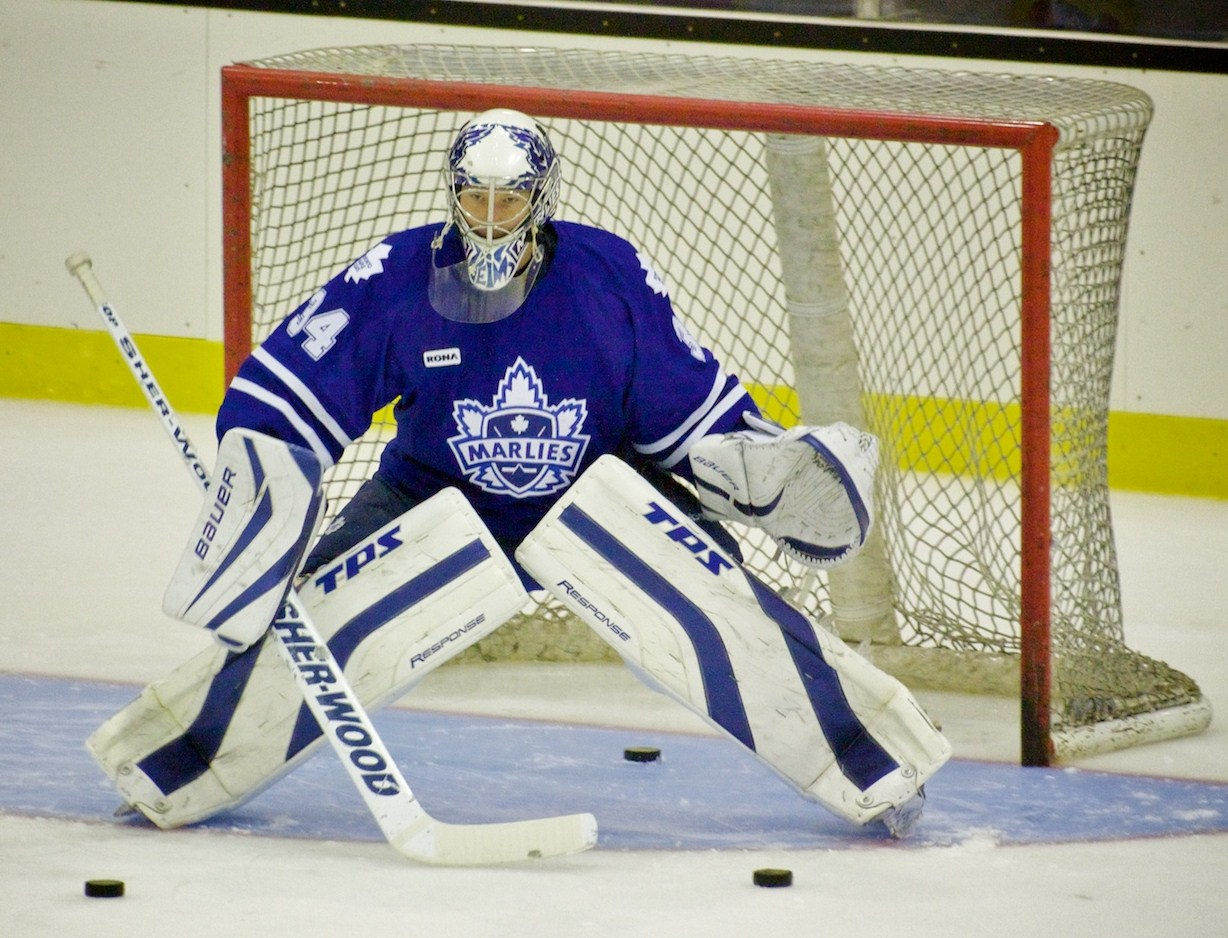
Goaltender James Reimer using his pads during a warm-up drill

In ice hockey, the goaltender wears large leg pads to protect him from low-down impact by a puck. To prevent these leg pads giving him advantage in defending the goal, there are restrictions on their size, which in recent years have been tightened by the National Hockey League. Traditional ice hockey leg pads were made of leather, but now lighter synthetic materials are used. Goaltenders' pads may be styled with geometric patterns for decoration.

=== Field hockey ===
Hockey pads are either small shin guards for outfield players or, along with the other pads, goalkeeping pads, similar to those in cricket or ice hockey.

=== Box lacrosse ===
In box lacrosse the goaltender wears leg pads to protect against the impact of shots low down (since the net is fairly low). There are restrictions on the dimensions of these pads, but unlike in ice hockey these relate to the depth of the pads.

== See also ==
- Cricket clothing and equipment
- Catcher's equipment (baseball and softball)
