= Sport industry =

Economic branch

The sport industry encompasses individuals, activities, businesses, and organizations involved in producing, facilitating, promoting, or organizing any activity, experience, or enterprise centered around sports. It is the market in which the businesses or products offered to its buyers are sports-related. The industry saw extreme growth in the 2020s, achieving unprecedented revenues. Former University of Oregon professors Dennis Howard and Roger Best estimated industry earnings of $2.65 trillion across the globe in 2023.

== Professional sports in the United States ==
The most significant organizations within the sporting industry are the professional leagues that most of the other industries in the sporting world revolve around. The major American sports leagues are the first five in the list following and include football, basketball, hockey, baseball, and soccer. Most players in these leagues make money from contracts with their team, as well as sponsors. These players are among the top earners in the United States.

=== Examples ===
Name	Net worth		
NFL	$74.8 billion		
NBA	$49.5 billion		
NHL	$18.4 billion		
MLB	$49.4 billion		
MLS	$4.3 billion	Snowmobiling	$39 billion in sales

== Sports apparel ==
Sports apparel includes a wide array of clothing articles. Many retailers offer these products. Many of these businesses have professional athletes who endorse them, securing them fans and buyers.

== Sports gambling ==
Sports gambling is legal in the United States. It involves making wagers based on some outcome of a contest or some aspect within the contest. In prior instances of legality, there were multiple incidents of professional athletes/referees committing scandals to increase payouts. The people placing the bets always have worse odds than those hosting the bets, and that is how this industry remains profitable.

Although PASPA was overturned in 2018, individual states are still considering what methods of sports gambling to allow and where. For example, sports gambling in certain US states and jurisdictions may be allowed in established casinos or race tracks.

Other considerations regarding legal sports betting remain clear: Offshore sportsbooks and bookmakers operating offshore cannot solicit or do business with American citizens. The 1961 Federal Wire Act - The Wire Act prohibits persons involved in the gambling business from transmitting several types of wagering-related communications over the wires. This basically means that online and telephone sports gambling is still not allowed in the United States.

Companies offering free sports gambling games remain unregulated. Fantasy Sports, considered by experts as skill games, are questionable in certain US jurisdictions. 32 states have either allowed or regulated fantasy sports during the past few years, before the PASPA overturning.

== Sports stadiums/travel ==
Sports are frequently held in large arenas that attract visitors from various regions. Some fans travel internationally to watch their favorite teams, and certain well-known venues continue to draw crowds regardless of a team's performance. The development and adaptation of these stadiums has become a significant industry, as they are often designed for multiple uses, including concerts and other large events. Transporting athletes safely and timely manner is also a key logistical concern.

== Sports supplements/medicine ==
Athletes often seek ways to improve their performance and gain an advantage over the competition. Over time, various supplements have been developed to support increased endurance, strength, and recovery. When combined with appropriate training programs and nutrition, these supplements can contribute to improved outcomes across different levels of athletic performance. While supplements are commonly associated with training, sports medicine plays a critical role in recovery. When athletes sustain injuries, they frequently turn to experienced medical professionals who specialize in treating similar conditions to aid in their rehabilitation.

== Memorabilia ==
Sports memorabilia comes in many forms, including signed apparel and trading cards. Fans often take pride in owning items that were used or signed by their favorite athletes.

== Marketing ==
Sports marketing is being highly influenced by changes social media. As sports clubs, franchises, and professional athletes leverage technology tied to social media networks and platforms to boost their marketing efforts and engage with fans, the impact is felt in sports marketing economics. Digital mobile games, digital video contents, fan-created contents using league footage, fantasy sports games, and other sports-themed digital media are on the rise. Sports marketing in its digital format is almost present everywhere in major sports brands, from clubs to retailers. Compared to 1990, sports marketing has not only changed from static to digital but, in terms of economic impact, has seen exponential growth. The availability to use stats in almost real-time has also impacted sports marketing in the sports gambling industry. Bookmakers are now able to market using an occurrence from a few minutes or even seconds ago.

Sports Industry Statistics and Market Size Overview (US$)
Year	Estimated Size of the Entire Sports Industry, U.S.	Estimated Size of the Global Sports Industry	Annual Company Spending for Sports Advertising, U.S.
2017	519.9 Billion	1.3 Trillion	37.7 Billion

== See also ==
- List of outdoor industry parent companies
