= Lacrosse glove =

Glove worn by lacrosse players

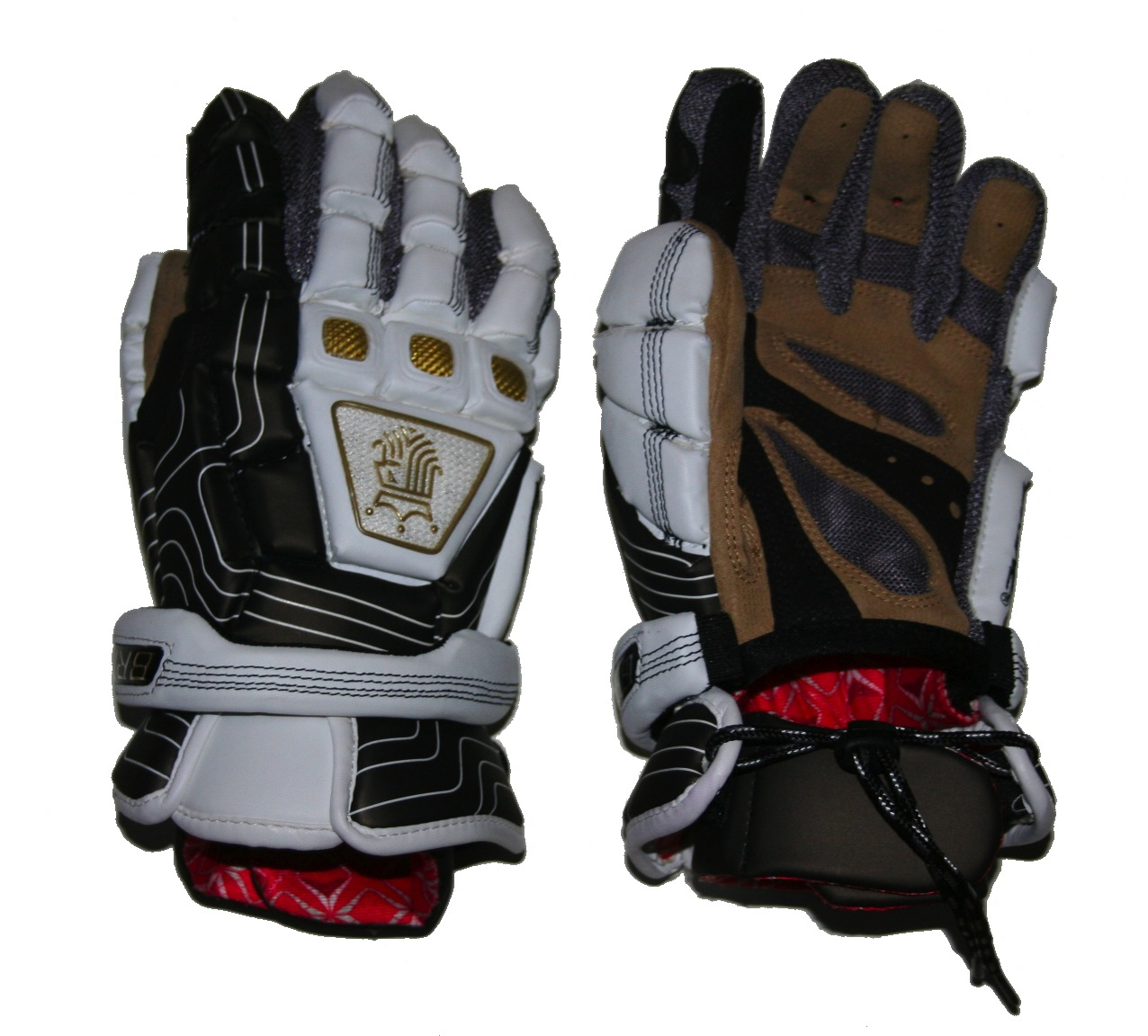
Lacrosse gloves

Lacrosse gloves are heavily padded, protective gloves worn by men's lacrosse players. The gloves are designed to protect players' hands, wrists, and forearms from checks, or legal defensive hitting common in the sport. Gloves consist of thick padding on the back of the hand and forearm covered in leather or canvas material, and a palm area made of synthetic and mesh material. A goaltender's gloves may have extra padding for the thumb to protect against injury from shots. While NCAA collegiate rules require that men's gloves have palms covered, other leagues, including post-collegiate club lacrosse, the National Lacrosse League, Major League Lacrosse, and international play, permit players to cut out the palm area for greater grip and control of the lacrosse stick.

Women's lacrosse rules do not require glove use, except for goalies since hitting is not permitted, but some players use smaller gloves for increased grip and minor protection from incidental contact.

The size of the glove is an important factor for players to consider, also including protective functionality, and what material the gloves are made out of. Ventilation, and dexterity can also be important factors. Many modern gloves offer a wrist cuff which can be adjusted by various means to fit securely to the player's wrist and provide the player with greater control of comfort and protection.

== See also ==
- Baseball glove
- Batting glove
- Boxing glove
- Cycling glove
- Driving glove
- Goalkeeper glove
- Golf gloves
- Glove (ice hockey)
- MMA gloves
- Wicket-keeper's gloves
