= Driving glove =

Leather glove for driving automobiles

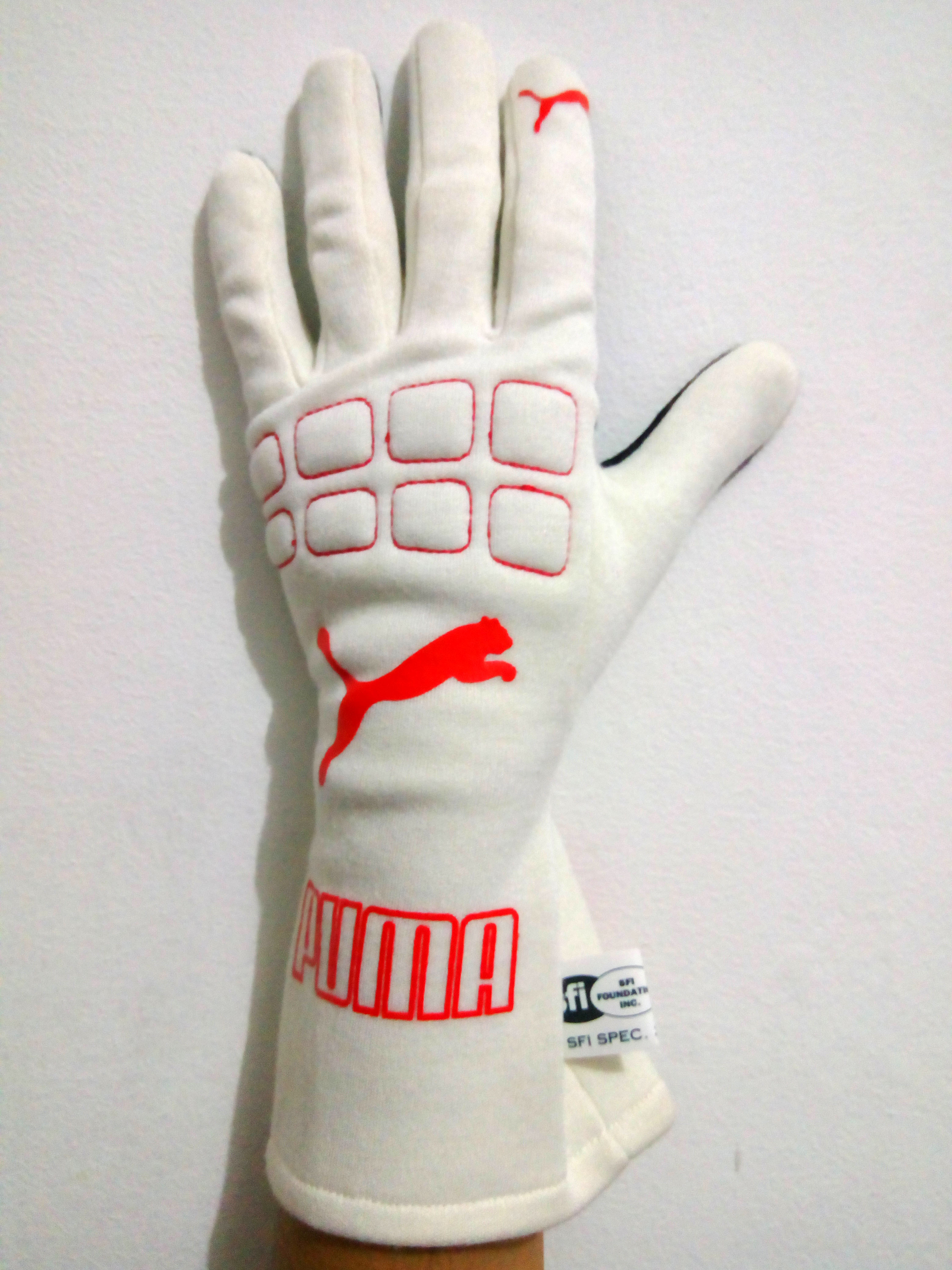
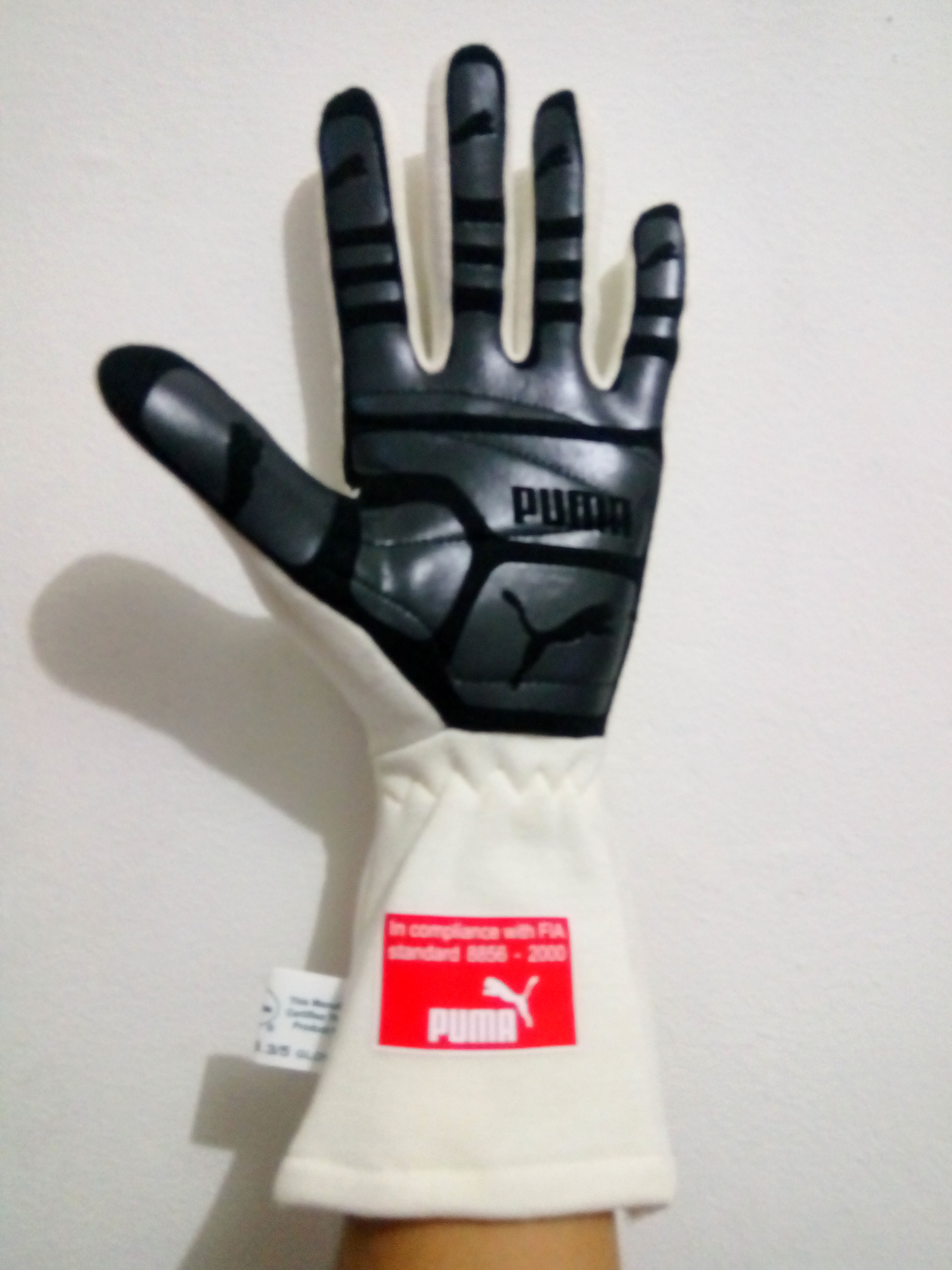
Modern driving gloves

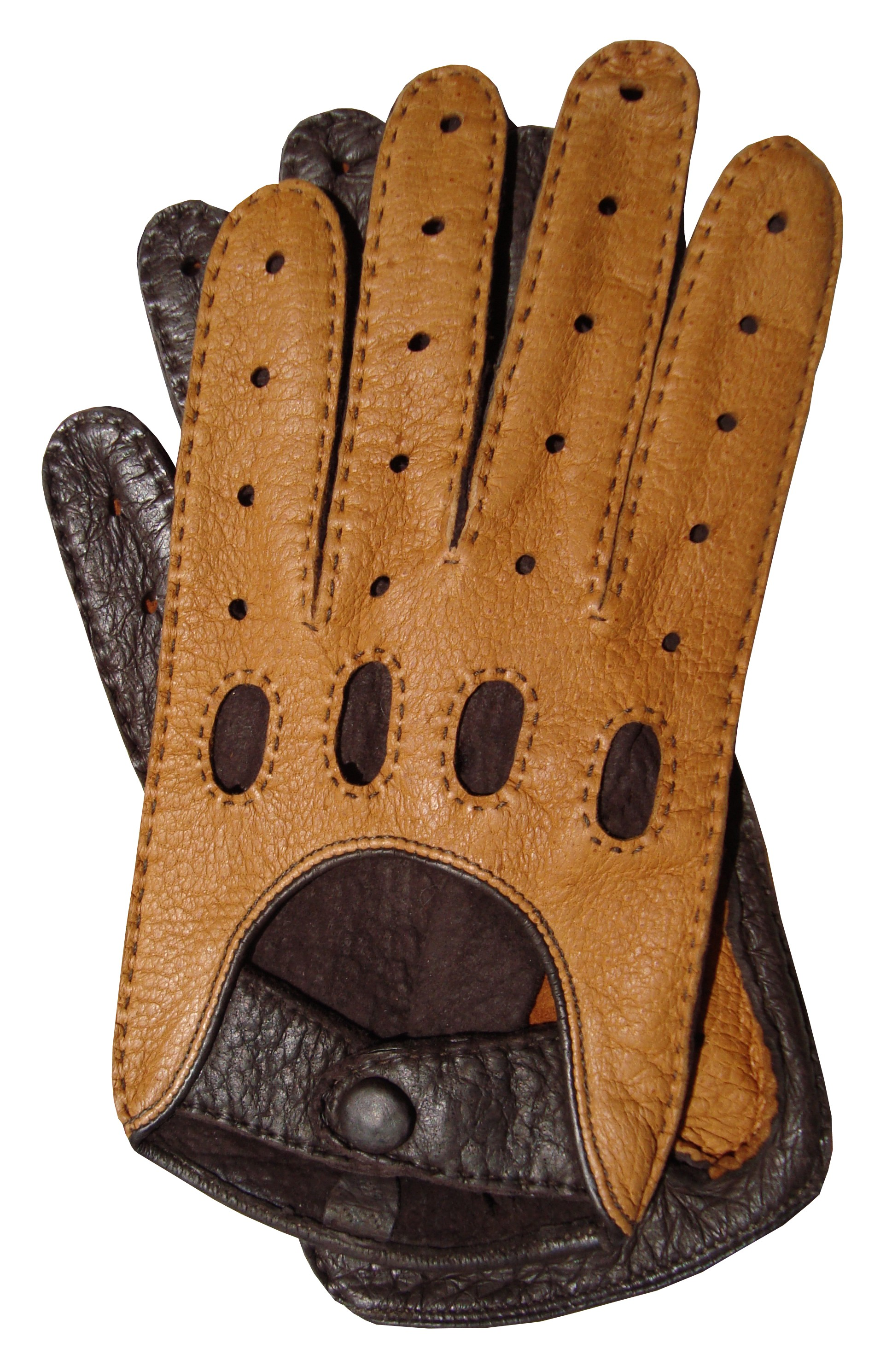
Peccary driving gloves

A driving glove is a hand covering, typically constructed of very thin, soft leather. It is used to give a driver better control of the vehicle by enhancing grip of the steering wheel and gear stick.

== History ==
The driving glove made its appearance during the 1890s. Steering wheels at the time were generally made from uncovered metal or wood. Internal heating in cars was not available since all cars were convertibles, and an uncovered metal steering wheel would be cold on the hands during winter and potentially slick with sweat in summer. For wooden steering wheels, gloves could protect the driver's hands from splinters.

The used gloves looked like gauntlet gloves and were usually lined, meaning they had an inner layer of wool, fur, or lambskin. It was not as important in the early days to have great sensitivity and contact with the steering wheel, but rather a firm grip to drive in a straight line due to the lack of power steering.

Early racing cars used steering wheels taken directly from road cars. These wheels were normally made from wood, necessitating the use and development of driving gloves. Racing driving gloves have developed over time, from Silver Arrows through to Grand Prix and modern gloves.

== Current use ==
Driving gloves fulfill at least two functions: grip and protection. Although maximum tactility is an obvious starting point for driving gloves, any glove can be marked as a driver's glove, and can improve the grip on the steering wheel. Some owners of classic cars still wear driving gloves in order to protect the vintage wooden or ivory steering wheel.

== Design ==
True driving gloves can be identified by the fact that they offer tactile advantages to drivers handling a car near the limits of adhesion. Made of soft leather, drivers gloves are unlined with external seams, which makes them seamless inside so as not to interfere with the sensitivity of the drivers touch on the steering wheel, and subsequently information from where the tire contacts the road.

Driving gloves feature open knuckles and back for maximum flexibility; ventilation to reduce stress on the soft, thin leather; holes punched in fingers and palms for ventilation; short cuffs so as not to restrict movement; and a stud fastener closure on the back for proper fit around the wrist and unobstructed view of the driver's chronograph.

== Racing driver's gloves ==
Racing gloves are specifically designed for increased grip and performance and protection against heat and flame for drivers in automobile competitions. Racing gloves must have cuffs to provide thermal shielding in conjunction with racing driver's suits. They are made of Nomex.

Because leather shrinks considerably when exposed to flame, the glove's leather is usually limited only to the tactile areas of the hand. There is usually no leather on the cuff, on the back of the hand, or between the fingers (also called fourchettes). The racing glove is supposed to be tight either at the wrist or at the extremity of the cuff.

The leather is meant to be used as an additional layer of material. The seams for attaching the leather have to be separate from the structural seams of the glove. The thickness of the leather is preferably as thin as possible.

Drivers of single-seater cars in races with standing starts must wear gloves in a high-visibility color, which contrasts with the predominant color of the car, so that the driver can clearly draw the attention of the race starter in case of difficulties.

== Styles ==
- Unlined - The philosophy behind unlined designs is to allow greater tactility that may not be present with full fingered gloves.
- Lined - Lined driver's gloves are frequently used to keep the hands warm, a function that is particularly necessary during top down operation in cold weather.
- Full fingered - Gloves that protect the entire hand from wrist to finger.
- Fingerless - Fingerless gloves have the fingers cut off.

== See also ==
- Baseball glove
- Batting glove
- Boxing glove
- Cycling glove
- Goalkeeper glove
- Golf gloves
- Hockey gloves
- Lacrosse glove
- MMA gloves
- Wicket-keeper's gloves
