= Hunts County =

Sports equipment and apparel company

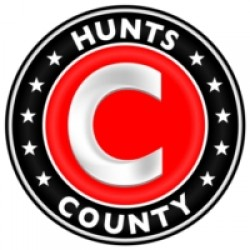
- Industry: Sports equipment, textile
- Founded: 1904; 122 years ago
- Headquarters: Huntingdon, Cambridgeshire, England
- Area served: Australia, South Africa, New Zealand, United Kingdom, India
- Products: Cricket clothing and equipment (bats, balls, helmet, batting gloves, protective gear, athletic shoes, bags)
- Website: www.huntscountybats.co.uk

Hunts County, commonly shortened to County, is a sports equipment and apparel company founded by the Trimmins family in 1904 based in Huntingdon, Cambridgeshire, England that specialises in cricket. The company produces cricket clothing and equipment such as bats, balls, helmet, batting gloves, protective gear, athletic shoes, and bags.

== Overview ==
The company still make all of their bats individually by hand at two separate factories in Cambridgeshire. From the 1960s County bats were some of the most widely used and recognised bats in cricket, with television spectators seeing County's encircled 'C' used by professional cricketers.

== Endorsements ==
A multitude of professional cricketers have had endorsement deals with the company over the years. Australian batsman Dean Jones used a County bat in his early career including during the 1987 Cricket World Cup.
