= Cycling glove =

Gloves designed for cycling

Cycling gloves are gloves designed for cycling. They may provide warmth, comfort and protection.

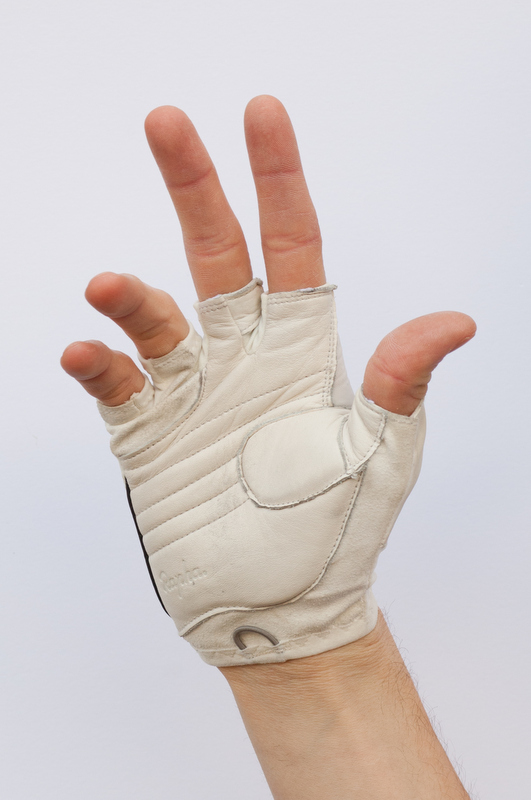
A white leather fingerless cycling glove on a man's hand

== Basic functionality ==
=== Warmth ===
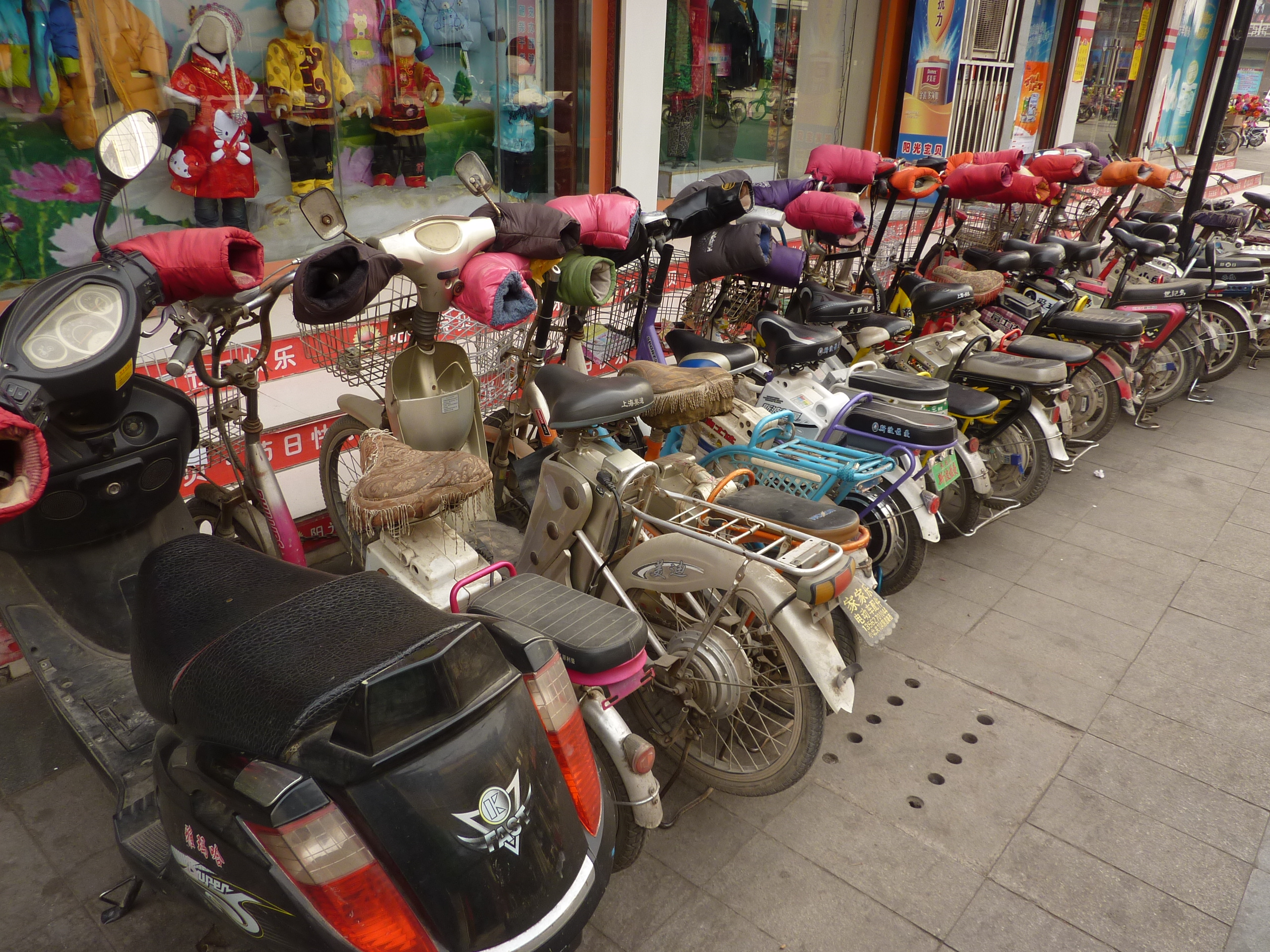
Handlebar mitts on electric scooters.

Gloves are frequently used to keep the hands warm, a function that is particularly necessary when cycling in cold weather. The design of most modern bicycles is such that the rider's hands remain on the handlebars while cycling, a position that leaves them exposed to weather. The hands are also relatively inactive, and do not have a great deal of muscle mass, which also contributes to the possibility of chill. Gloves are therefore vital for insulating the hands from cold, wind, and evaporative cooling while riding a bicycle.

=== Grip ===
In warm weather, sweat from cyclists' hands can cause difficulty maintaining control over the bicycle by making handlebars slippery and difficult to hold without increased hand tension (which can cause further issues and numbness). Cycling gloves, some designed without full finger covering and with ventilation to reduce temperature (the opposite intention of cold weather gloves) are used to increase grip and prevent sweat from making handlebars slippery.

=== Comfort ===
Cycling places a good deal of stress on the hands, in the form of prolonged pressure against handlebars and transmission of sudden road shocks through handlebars to the hands. The severity of discomfort can be mitigated somewhat by riding position, but is essentially inherent in most designs of upright bicycle. However, choice of weight distribution between the saddle and handlebars is usually determined by other factors, such as aerodynamics, control and long-term comfort. Padded gloves or handlebar grips are therefore useful to increase comfort for a given geometry.

However, excess padding can lead to other problems. Normally the hands will rest on the bones in the heel of the hand - too much padding will tend to press on the soft tissues between these and can compress the nerves in the hands, causing something akin to carpal tunnel syndrome.

=== Face and nose wiping ===
Cyclists often deal with perspiration and nose running on a constant basis. Because clothes and paper tissues may be difficult and time-consuming to use during cycling, many cyclists have resorted to using the backs of their gloves to wipe the sweat from their faces and the nasal mucus that drips from their noses. Many modern cycling gloves come with a built in "nose wipe" on the back of the hand, typically on the thumb or forefinger or both. Aftermarket fabric nose wipes that slip onto the back of the hand or wrist of the glove are also preferred by some cyclists.

=== Protection ===
Gloves are worn for protection in case of accidents. Putting a hand out to break a fall is a natural reaction. However, the hands are one of the more difficult parts of the body to repair. There is little or no spare skin, and immobilising the hands sufficiently to promote healing involves significant inconvenience to the patient. So, many cyclists choose to wear gloves all year round to help avoid skin damage in a fall.

== Types of gloves ==
=== Fingerless ===
Fingerless cycling gloves, also known as track mitts. These have a lightly padded palm of leather (natural or synthetic), gel or other material. Historically track mitts were string-backed but now are almost always made of a man-made textile containing elastane. Leather-palmed track mitts and cork handlebar tape are widely reckoned to work well for drop-bar touring bikes.

=== Weather-proof ===
Windproof/waterproof full-finger gloves are useful in spring and autumn, when real warmth is not an issue. These are also generally showerproof but will become soggy in heavy rain. Palms may be treated to improve friction with brake levers.

Winter gloves tend to be bulkier, perhaps being made in two parts, inner and outer, so that the inner can be washed. They will tend to have longer cuffs, to tuck into jackets and avoid the wrists being chilled, a waterproof exterior and a layer of insulation between that and the liner or inner glove.

==== Other weather protection for hands ====
Weathershields are small water- and windproof shields that attach to the handlebars and protect the hands from rain and wind. Though not gloves, they serve a similar purpose.

Riders who spend an extended amount of time in very cold weather may place handlebar mitts on their bicycle handlebars, to keep wind, cold, and precipitation away from hands and handlebar area. These are not technically considered "gloves" as they are not worn on the hand, but they fulfill the same function. They often resemble the pogies used in watersports.

=== Mittens ===
Mittens are good in extreme cold as they allow a single pocket of warm air to form around the fingers. They make use of some brakes somewhat awkward. Some riders use a thin inner glove and a skiing mitten over the top when riding in below-freezing temperatures.

Lobster-claw gloves or lobster mittens are halfway between glove and mitten. Two fingers are placed in each of two wide fingers, giving much of the advantage of mittens but making use of brake levers much easier.

Mittens are not permitted in certain track competitions.

=== Mountain biking ===
Mountain biking has evolved to the point where it has its own style of safety gear, including a cycling glove designed for off-road riding. They have more padding, to increase shock absorption and overall comfort, full-finger protection, and leather palms.

== Care of gloves ==
Sweat from hands can make one's gloves become unpleasant quite quickly, so it is best to store them so that air can circulate inside if at all possible (for example on a radiator). After a wet or hard ride it may be best to turn them inside-out to dry. Leather gloves can be washed in cool water and are reportedly best dried out on the hands.

== See also ==
- Baseball glove
- Batting glove
- Cycling kit
- Driving glove
- Wicket-keeper's gloves
