= Glove =

Covering worn on the hand

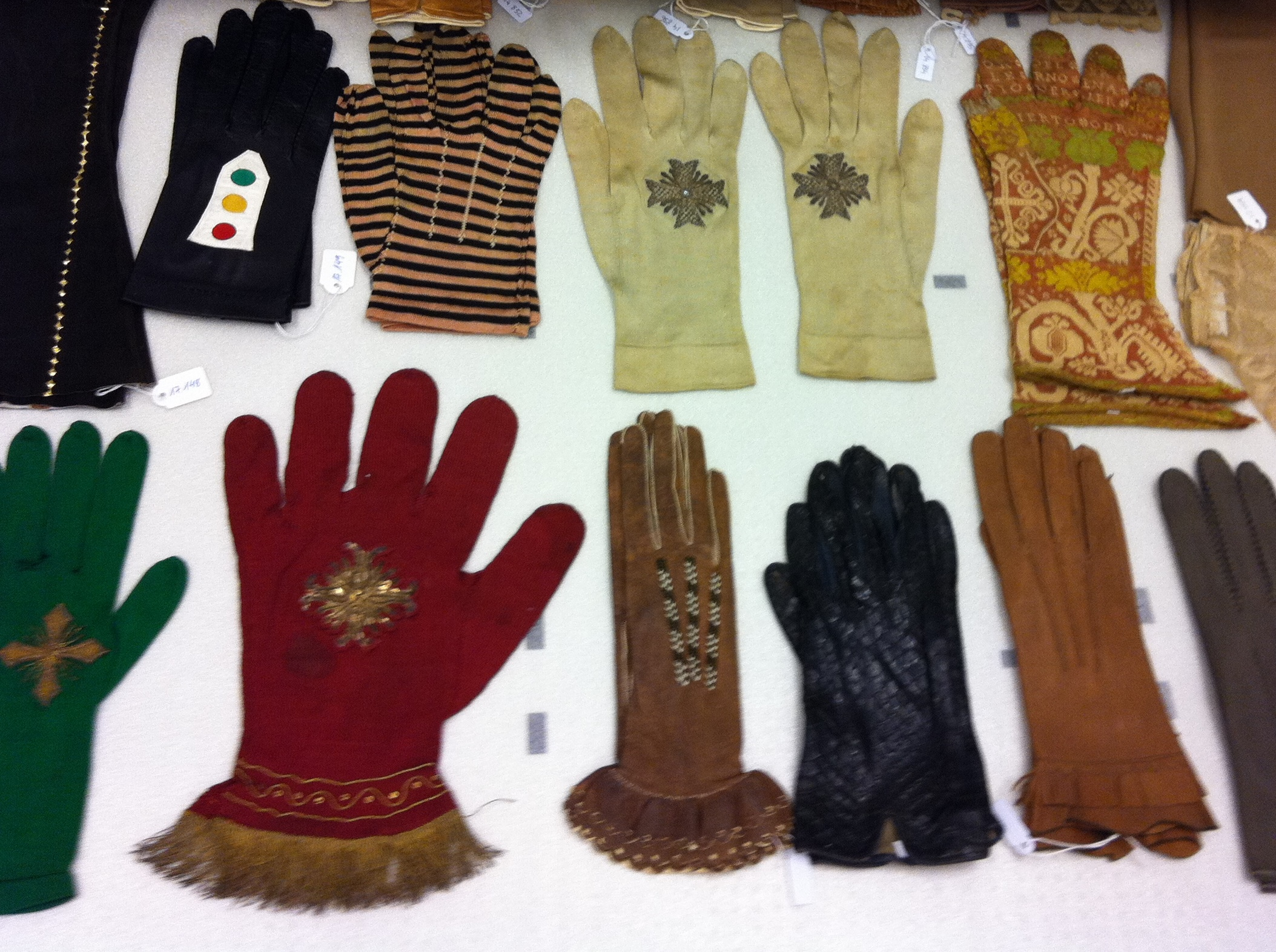
- Assorted gloves (a museum collection)
- Type: hand's protection

A glove is a garment covering the hand, with separate sheaths or openings for each finger including the thumb. Gloves protect and comfort hands against cold or heat, damage by friction, abrasion or chemicals, and disease; or in turn to provide a guard for what a bare hand should not touch.

Gloves are made of materials including cloth, knitted or felted wool, leather, rubber, latex, neoprene, silk, and (in mail) metal. Gloves of kevlar protect the wearer from cuts. Gloves and gauntlets are integral components of pressure suits and spacesuits.

Latex, nitrile rubber or vinyl disposable gloves are often worn by health care professionals as hygiene and contamination protection measures. Police officers often wear them to work in crime scenes to prevent destroying evidence in the scene. Many criminals wear gloves to avoid leaving fingerprints, which makes the crime investigation more difficult. However, the gloves themselves can leave prints that are just as unique as human fingerprints.

If there is an opening but no (or a short) covering sheath for each finger they are called fingerless gloves. Fingerless gloves are useful where dexterity is required that gloves would restrict. Cigarette smokers and church organists sometimes use fingerless gloves. Cycling gloves for road racing or touring are usually fingerless. Guitar players may also use fingerless gloves in circumstances where it is too cold to play with an uncovered hand.

A hybrid of glove and mitten contains open-ended sheaths for the four fingers (as in a fingerless glove, but not the thumb) and an additional compartment encapsulating the four fingers. This compartment can be lifted off the fingers and folded back to allow the individual fingers ease of movement and access while the hand remains covered. The usual design is for the mitten cavity to be stitched onto the back of the fingerless glove only, allowing it to be flipped over (normally held back by a hook-and-loop fastener or a button) to transform the garment from a mitten to a glove. These hybrids are called convertible mittens or "glittens".

== History ==
Gloves appear to be of great antiquity. They are depicted in an ancient Egyptian tomb dating to the 5th dynasty. According to some translations of Homer's The Odyssey, Laërtes is described as wearing gloves while walking in his garden so as to avoid the brambles. (Other translations, however, insist that Laertes pulled his long sleeves over his hands.) Herodotus, in The History of Herodotus (440 BC), tells how Leotychides was incriminated by a glove (gauntlet) full of silver that he received as a bribe. There are occasional references to the use of gloves among the Romans as well. Pliny the Younger (c. 100), his uncle's shorthand writer wore gloves in winter so as not to impede the elder Pliny's work.

A gauntlet, which could be a glove made of leather or some kind of metal armour, was a strategic part of a soldier's defense throughout the Middle Ages, but the advent of firearms made hand-to-hand combat rare. As a result, the need for gauntlets disappeared.

During the 13th century, gloves began to be worn by ladies as a fashion ornament. They were made of linen and silk, and sometimes reached to the elbow. Such worldly accoutrements were not for holy women, according to the early 13th century Ancrene Wisse, written for their guidance. Sumptuary laws were promulgated to restrain this vanity: against samite gloves in Bologna, 1294, against perfumed gloves in Rome, 1560.

A Paris corporation or guild of glovers (gantiers) existed from the thirteenth century. They made them in skin or in fur.

By 1440, in England glovers had become members of the Dubbers or Bookbinders Guild until they formed their own guild during the reign of Elizabeth I. The Glovers' Company was incorporated in 1613.

It was not until the 16th century that gloves reached their greatest elaboration, however, when Queen Elizabeth I set the fashion for wearing them richly embroidered and jewelled, and for putting them on and taking them off during audiences to draw attention to her beautiful hands. The 1592 "Ditchley" portrait of her features her holding leather gloves in her left hand. In Paris, the gantiers became gantiers parfumeurs, for the scented oils, musk, ambergris and civet, that perfumed leather gloves, but their trade, which was an introduction at the court of Catherine de Medici, was not specifically recognised until 1656, in a royal brevet. Makers of knitted gloves, which did not retain perfume and had less social cachet, were organised in a separate guild, of bonnetiers who might knit silk as well as wool. Such workers were already organised in the fourteenth century. Knitted gloves were a refined handiwork that required five years of apprenticeship; defective work was subject to confiscation and burning. In the 17th century, gloves made of soft chicken skin became fashionable. The craze for gloves called "limericks" took hold. This particular fad was the product of a manufacturer in Limerick, Ireland, who fashioned the gloves from the skin of unborn calves.

Embroidered and jeweled gloves formed part of the insignia of emperors and kings. Thus Matthew of Paris, in recording the burial of Henry II of England in 1189, mentions that he was buried in his coronation robes with a golden crown on his head and gloves on his hands. Gloves were found on the hands of King John when his tomb was opened in 1797 and on those of King Edward I when his tomb was opened in 1774.

Pontifical gloves are liturgical ornaments used primarily by the pope, the cardinals, and bishops. They may be worn only at the celebration of mass. The liturgical use of gloves has not been traced beyond the beginning of the 10th century, and their introduction may have been due to a simple desire to keep the hands clean for the holy mysteries, but others suggest that they were adopted as part of the increasing pomp with which the Carolingian bishops were surrounding themselves. From the Frankish kingdom the custom spread to Rome, where liturgical gloves are first heard of in the earlier half of the 11th century. When short sleeves came into fashion in the 1700s, women began to wear long gloves, reaching halfway up the forearm. By the 1870s, buttoned kid, silk, or velvet gloves were worn with evening or dinner dress, and long suede gloves were worn during the day and when having tea.

Mainly during the 19th century, the generic or trade name "Berlin gloves" was used for washable, thin white cotton gloves often worn by servants, such as butlers or waiters, and the less well-off in civilian life. The term was also used for white cotton gloves worn with the dress uniform by the American military in the First World War.

In 1905, The Law Times made one of the first references to the use of gloves by criminals to hide fingerprints, stating: For the future... when the burglar goes a-burgling, a pair of gloves will form a necessary part of his outfit.

Early Formula One race cars used steering wheels taken directly from road cars. They were normally made from wood, necessitating the use of driving gloves.

Disposable latex gloves were developed by the Australian company Ansell.

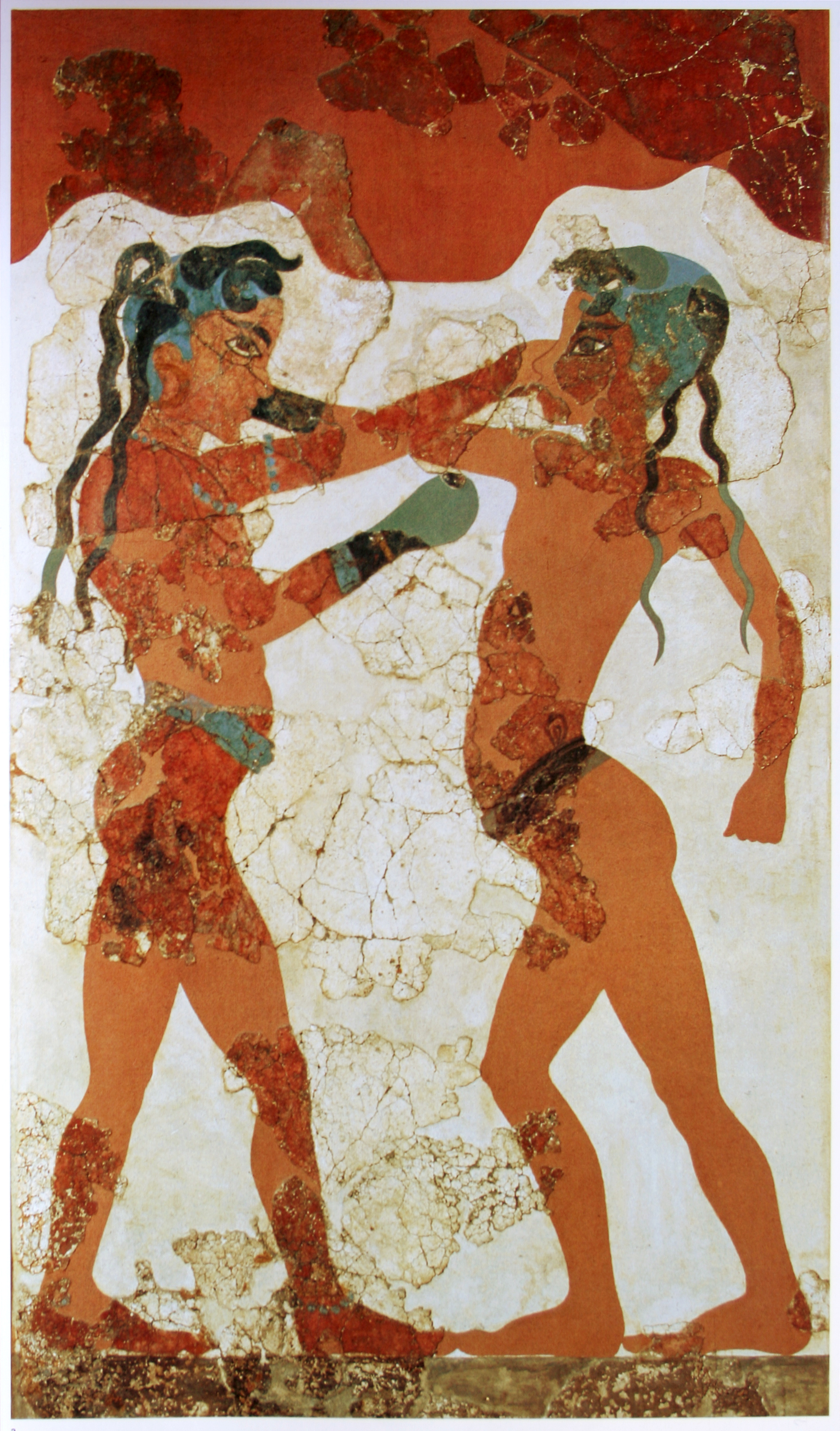
Minoan youths boxing, Knossos fresco. One of the earliest documented uses of gloves.

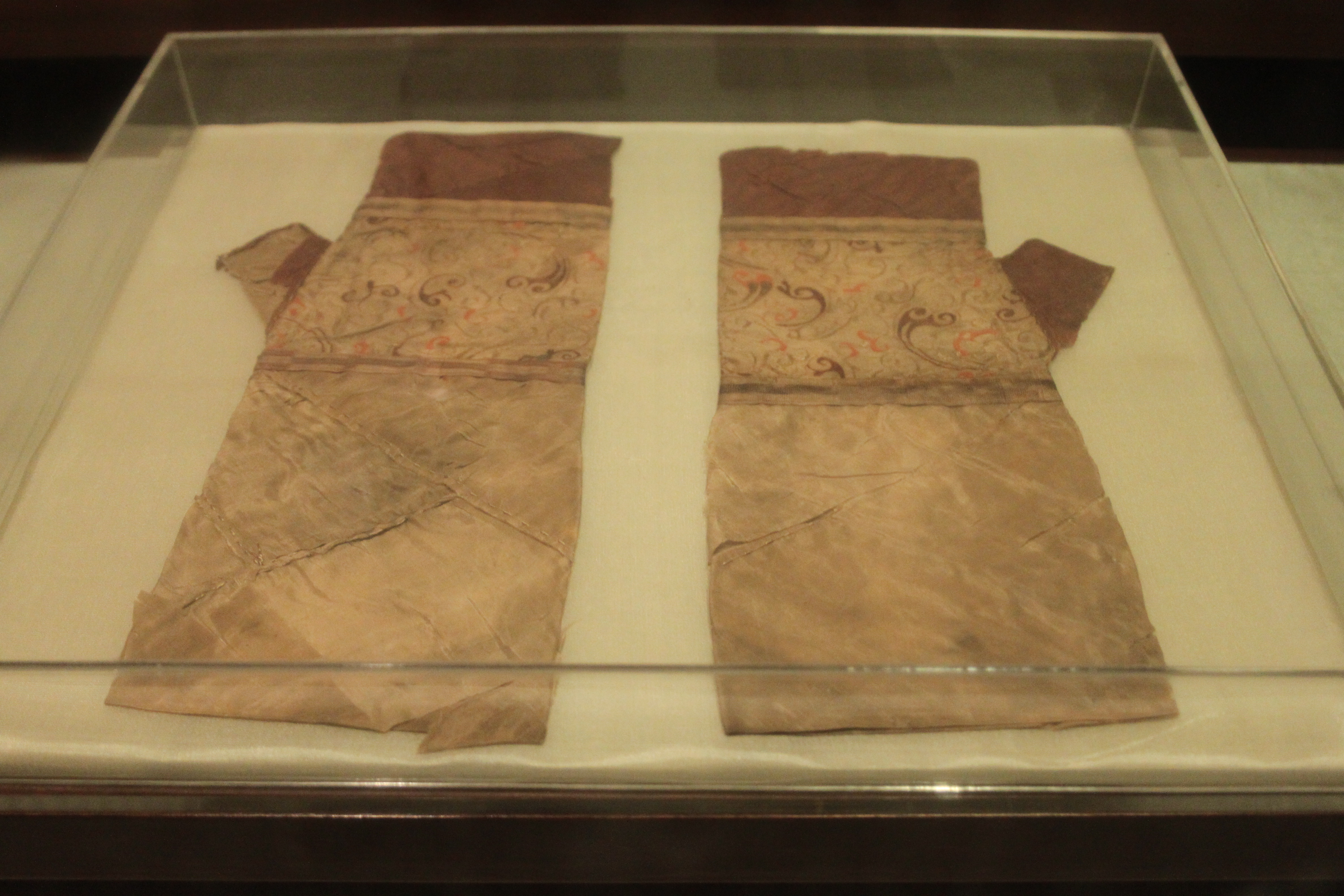
Han dynasty half-finger mitts, 2nd century BCE, embroidered silk, unearthed from Mawangdui.

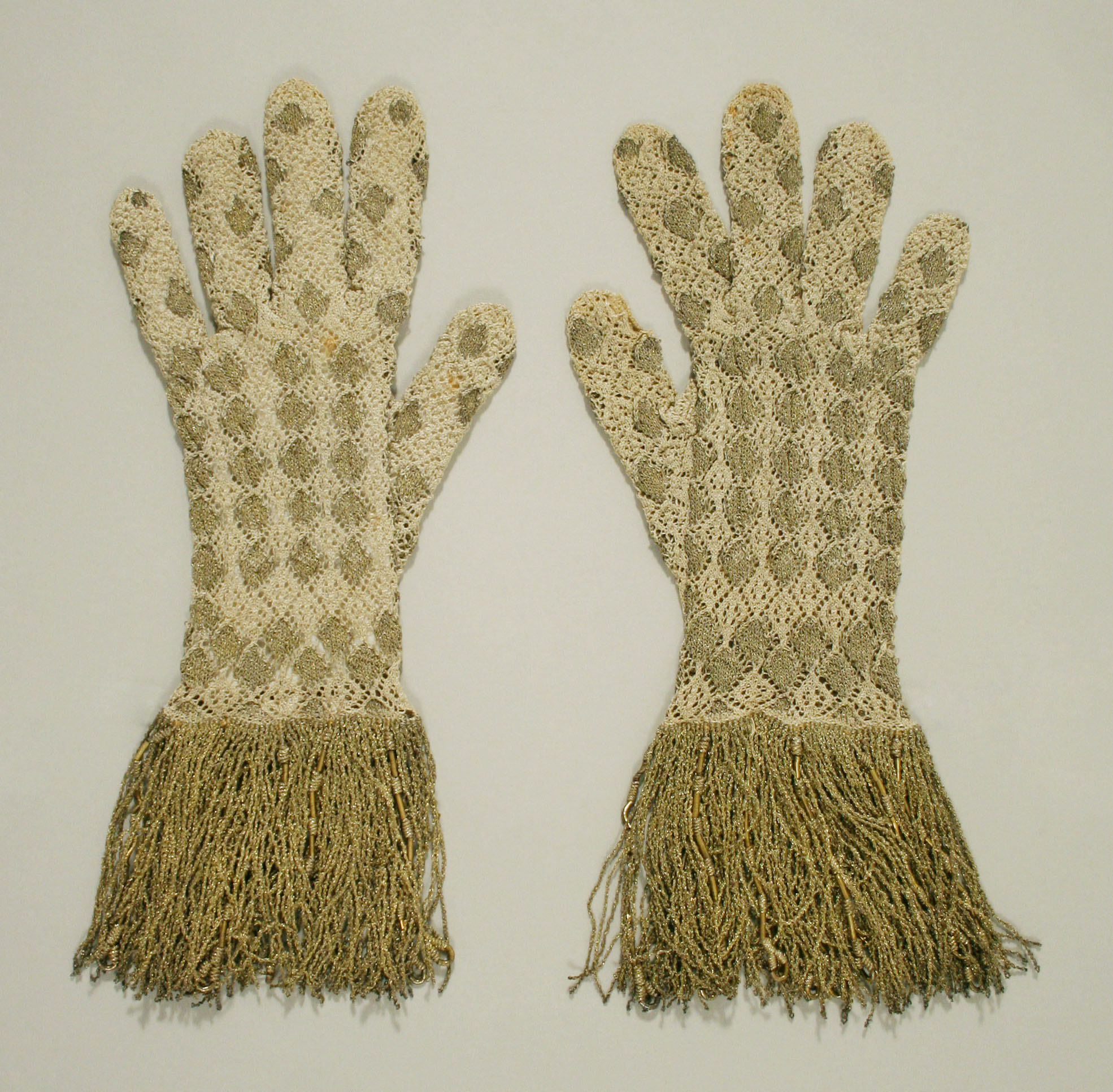
European gloves, late 17th century, silk, metal thread. Metropolitan Museum of Art.

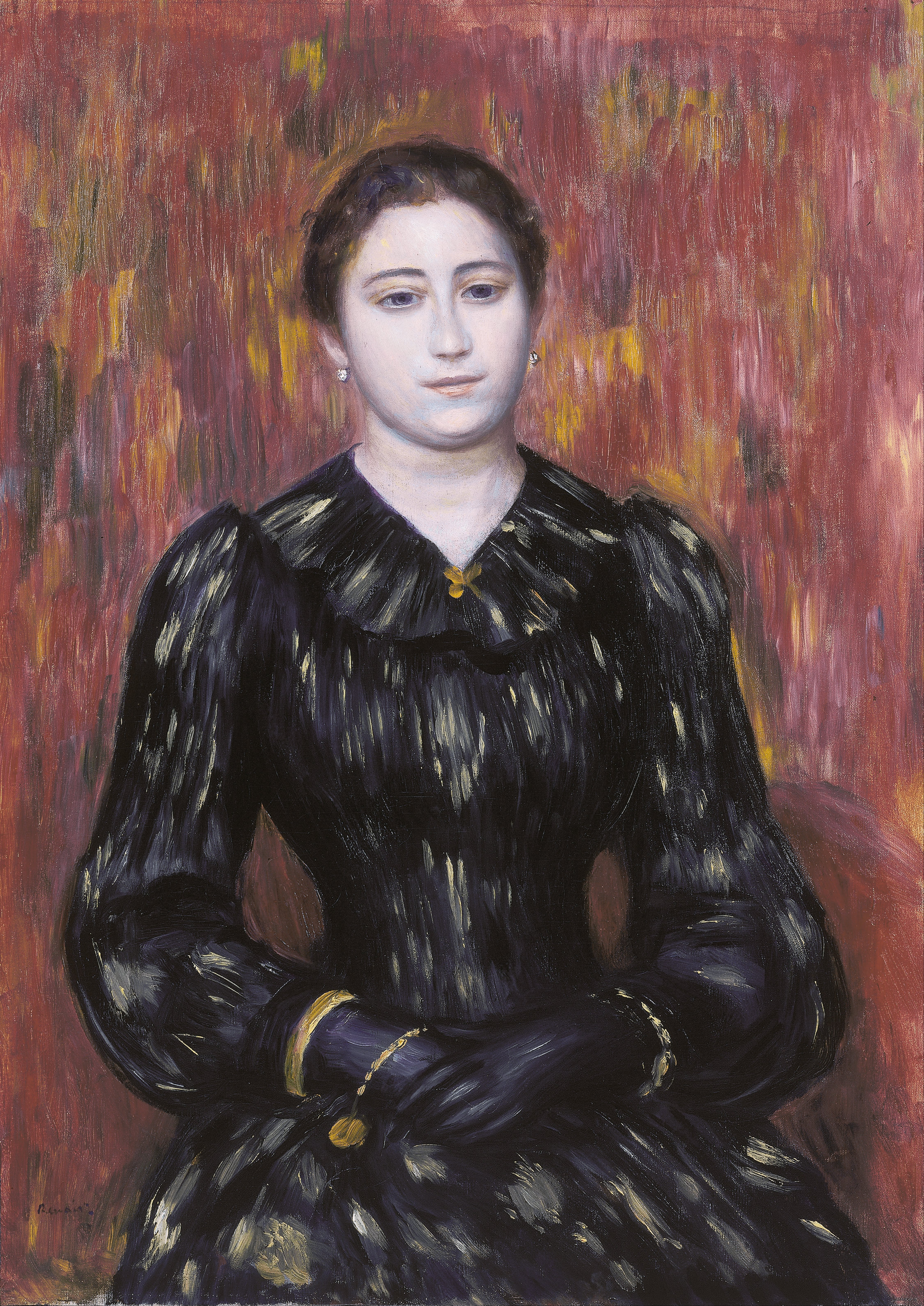
Portrait of Mme. Paulin wearing gloves, Pierre-Auguste Renoir

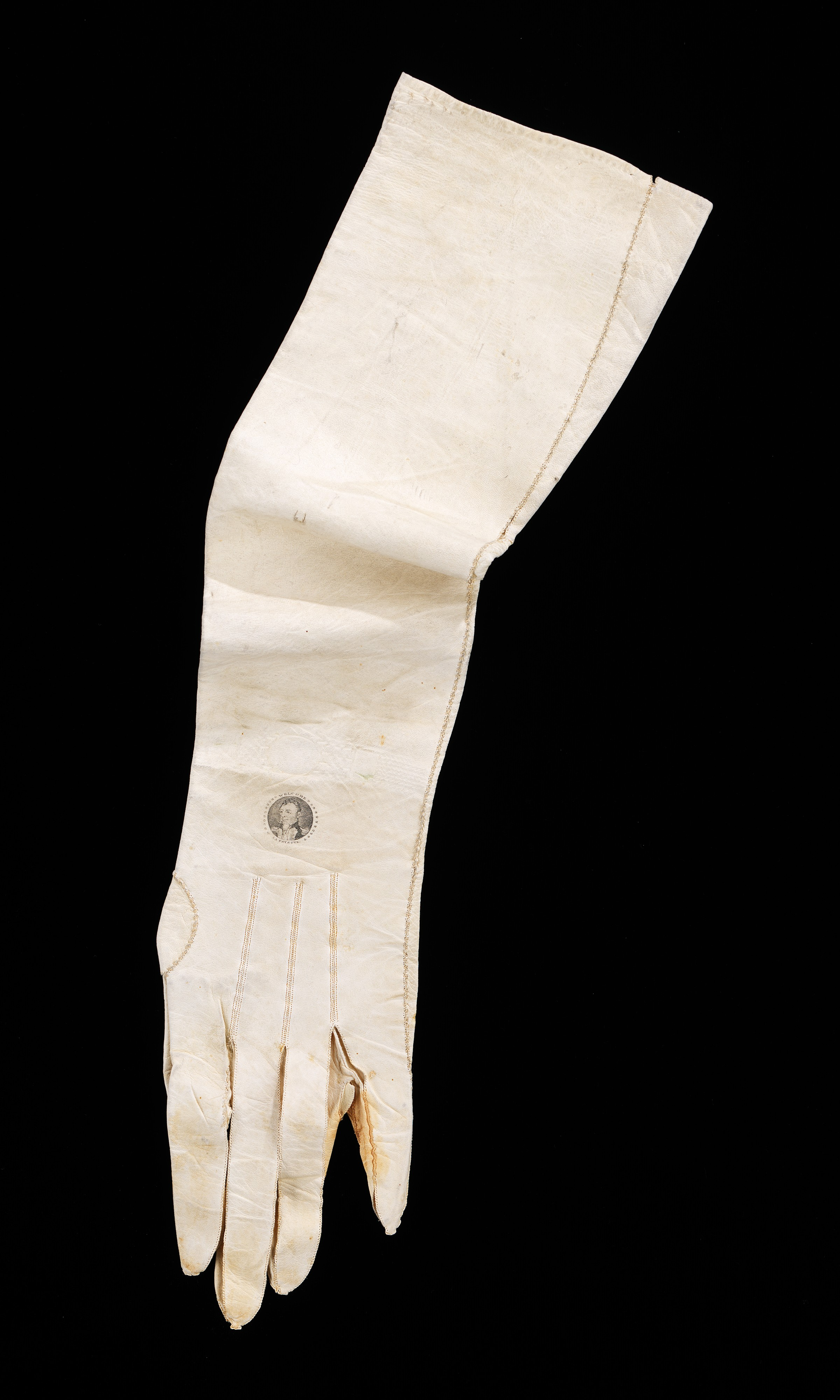
A glove commemorating the visit of General Lafayette to the United States in 1824.

== Types of glove ==
=== Commercial and industrial ===
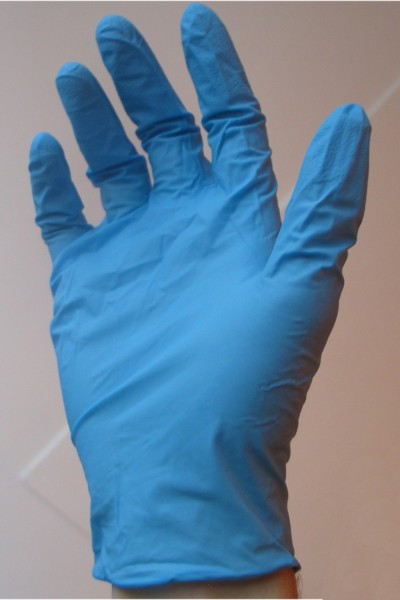
A disposable nitrile rubber glove

- Aircrew gloves: while they enable the wearer to touch a hot surface while retreating, they are insufficient for burn protection
- Anti-vibration gloves
- Barbed wire handler's gloves
- Chainmail gloves are used by butchers, woodcutters and police
- Chainsaw safety gloves
- Chemical-resistant gloves
- Cotton knitted gloves are used in automotive workshops, building maintenance, logistic material movement
- Temperature protective gloves
- Cut-resistant gloves
- Fireman's gauntlets
- Food service gloves
- Gardening gloves
- Impact protection gloves
- Medical gloves
- Military gloves
- Rubber gloves
- Sandblasting gloves
- Welder's gloves
- Wildlife handling gloves

=== Sport and recreational ===
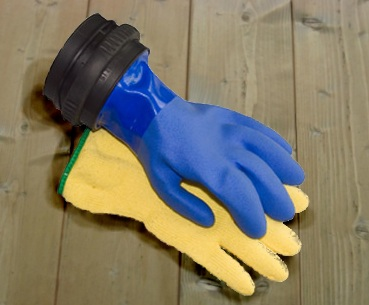
Dry scuba gloves

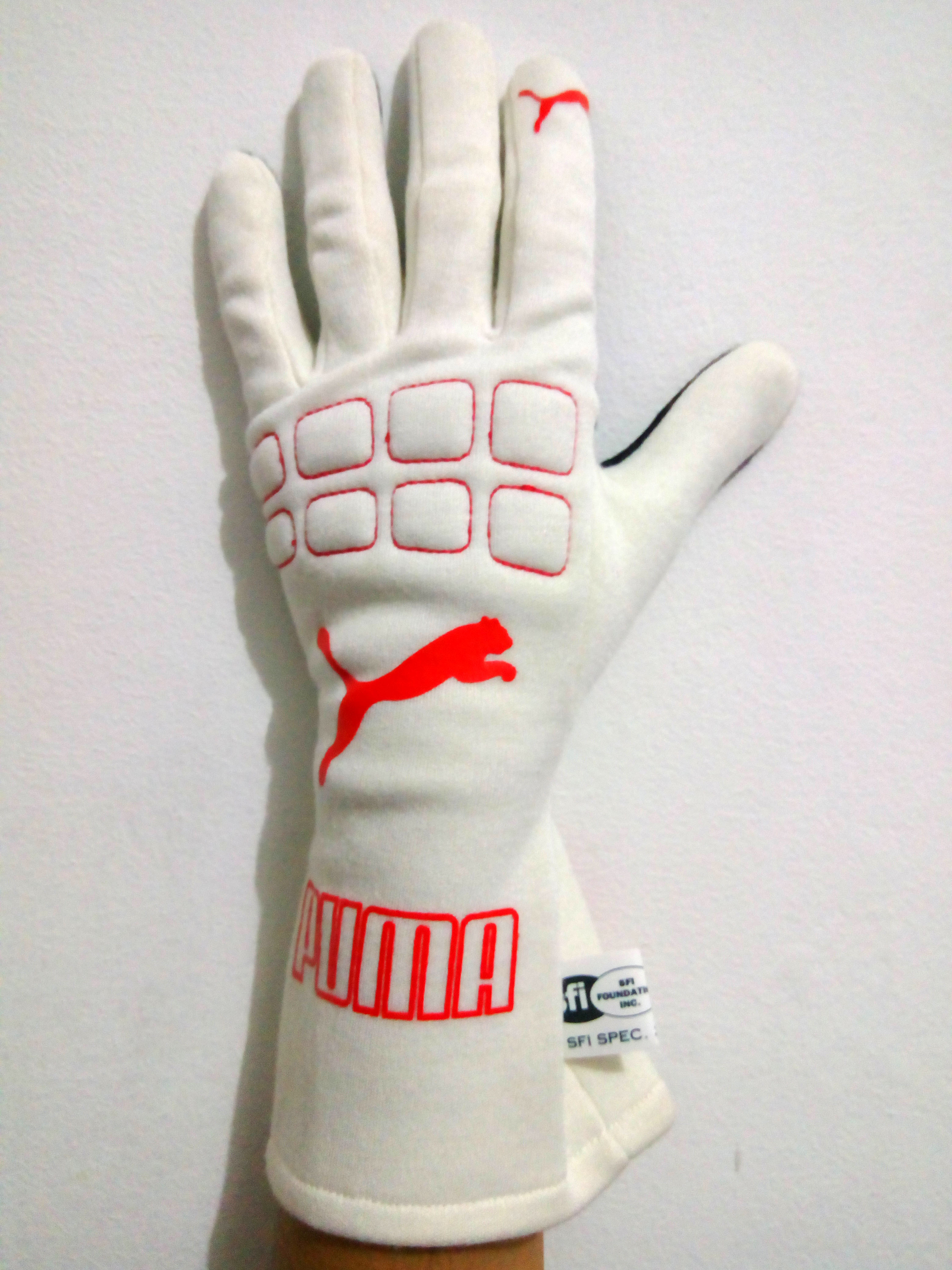
Racing drivers gloves

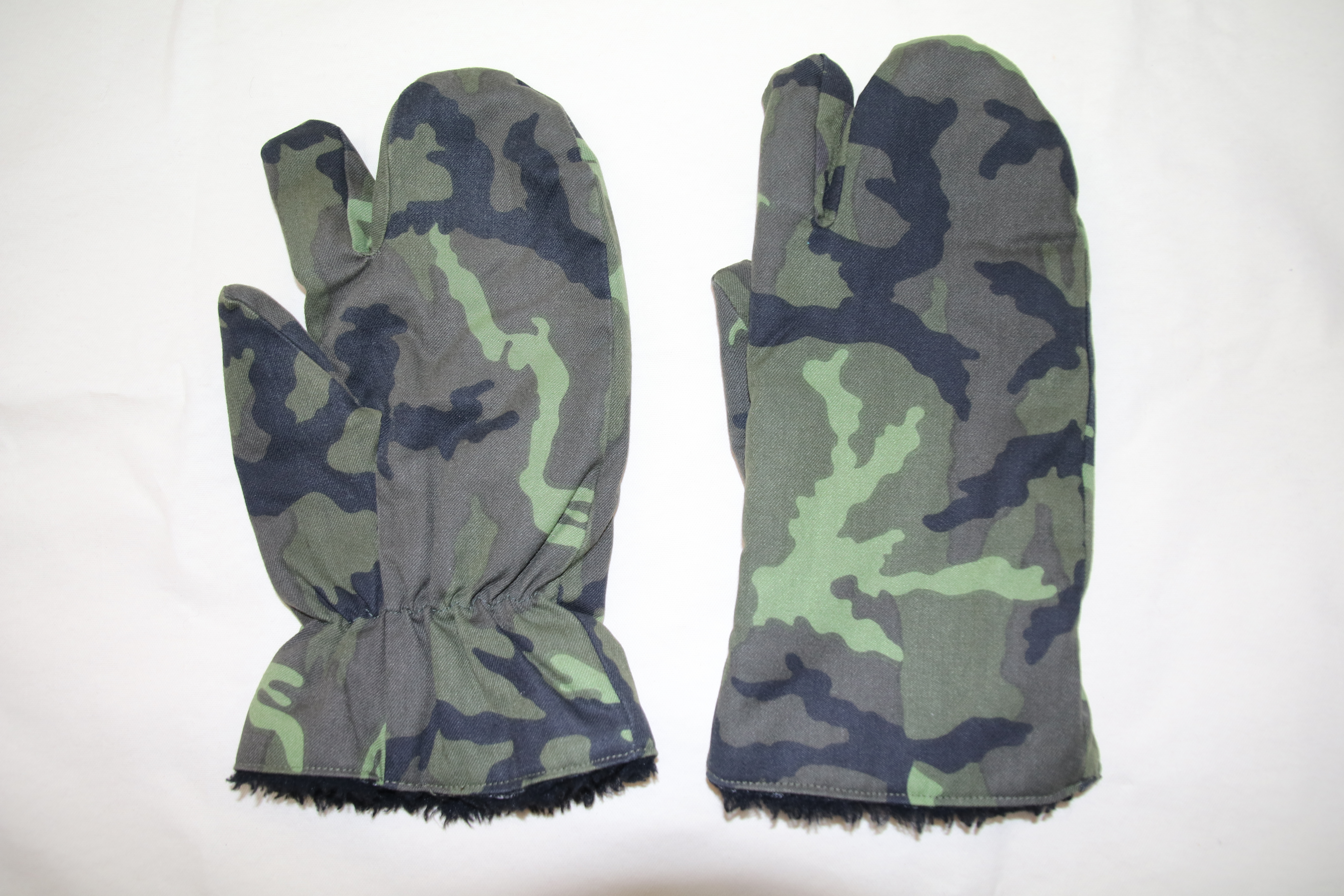
Three finger army shooting gloves.

- American football various position gloves
- Archer's glove
- Baseball glove or catcher's mitt: in baseball, the players in the field wear gloves to help them catch the ball and prevent injury to their hands.
- Billiards glove
- Boxing gloves: a specialized padded mitten
- Cricket gloves
  - The batsmen wear gloves with heavy padding on the back, to protect the fingers in case of being struck with the ball.
  - The wicket keeper wears large webbed gloves.
- Cycling gloves
- Driving gloves intended to improve the grip on the steering wheel. Driving gloves have external seams, open knuckles, open backs, ventilation holes, short cuffs, and wrist snaps. The most luxurious are made from Peccary gloving leather.
- Eton Fives glove
- Falconry glove
- Fencing glove
- Football – goalkeeper glove
- Gardening glove
- Golf glove
- Ice hockey glove
- Gym gloves
- Riding gloves
- Racquetball gloves
- Lacrosse gloves
- Kendo kote
- MMA gloves
- Motorcycling gloves
- Oven gloves – or oven mitts, used when cooking
- Paintball glove
- Racing drivers gloves with long cuffs, intended for protection against heat and flame for drivers in automobile competitions.
- Scuba diving gloves:
  - Cotton gloves; good abrasion, but no thermal protection
  - Dry gloves; made of rubber with a latex wrist seal to prevent water entry
  - Wet gloves; made of neoprene and allowing restricted water entry
- Shooting glove
  - Biathlon glove – an articulated padded combination of a skiing glove and a shooting glove, offers cold temperature protection outside in winter, as well as padding to support the .22lr ammunition single-action / Fortner-action biathlon rifle, and is suitable for using with poles in cross country skiing.
  - Pistol glove – used in competition pistol shooting to improve performance and cushion the shooting hand.
  - Target rifle glove – open-fingered heavily padded one-hand (non-shooting) glove with non-skid surfaces, used to support the rifle in prone shooting position. Also may be used in kneeling, sitting and standing positions. The glove cushions and distributes the weight of the rifle, which varies from 3 kilograms (6.6 lb) to 7 kilograms (15 lb), depending on type of rifle stock used.

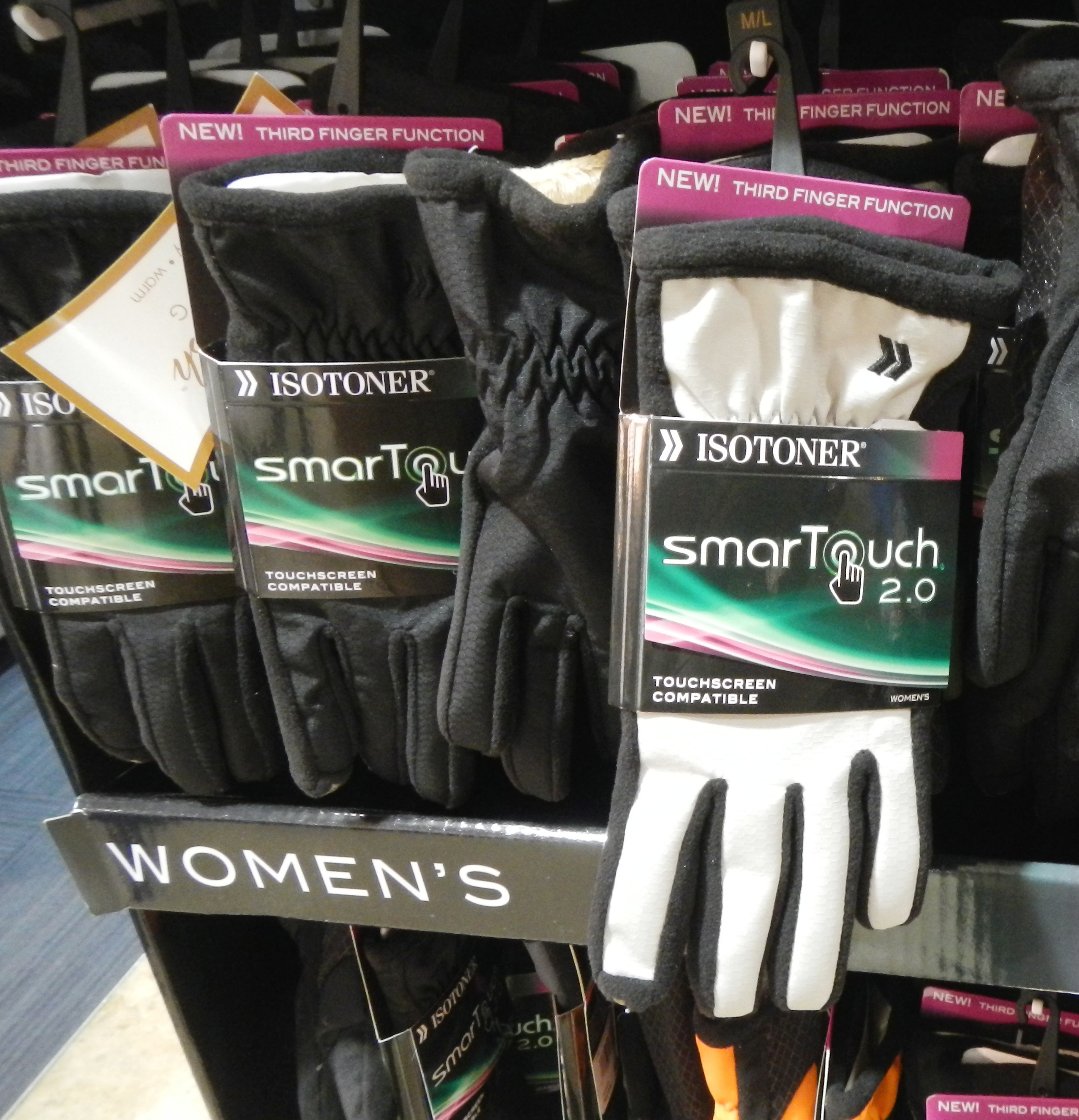
Touchscreen gloves, fingertip type

- Skiing gloves are padded and reinforced to protect from the cold, and from injury by skis.
- Touchscreen gloves – made with conductive material to enable the wearer's natural electric capacitance to interact with capacitive touchscreen devices without the need to remove one's gloves
  - Finger tip conductivity; where conductive yarns or a conductive patch is found only on the tips of the fingers (typically the index finger and thumb) thus allowing for basic touch response
  - Full hand conductivity; where the entire glove is made from conductive materials allowing for robust tactile touch and dexterity good for accurate typing and multi-touch response
- Underwater hockey gloves – with protective padding, usually of silicone rubber or latex, across the back of the fingers and knuckles to protect from impact with the puck; usually only one, either left- or right-hand, is worn depending on which is the playing hand.
- Washing mitt or Washing glove: a tool for washing the body (one's own, or of a child, a patient, a lover).
- Webbed gloves – a swim training device or swimming aid.
- Weightlifting gloves
- Wired glove
  - Power Glove – an alternate controller for use with the Nintendo Entertainment System
- Wheelchair gloves – for users of manual wheelchairs

=== Women's fashion ===
Western women's gloves for formal and semi-formal wear come in three lengths: wrist ("matinee"), elbow, and opera or full-length (over the elbow, reaching to the biceps). Satin and stretch satin are popular and mass-produced. Some women wear gloves as part of "dressy" outfits, such as for church and weddings. Long white gloves are common accessories for teenage girls attending formal events such as prom, quinceañera, cotillion, or formal ceremonies at church, such as confirmation.

=== Others ===
In Japan, white gloves are worn frequently. Work-oriented white gloves are worn for activities such as gardening and cleanup; "dress" white gloves are worn by professionals who want a clean public appearance, such as taxi drivers, police, politicians and elevator operators. However white gloves are not recommended for touching old books and similar antiquities.

== Fingerless gloves ==
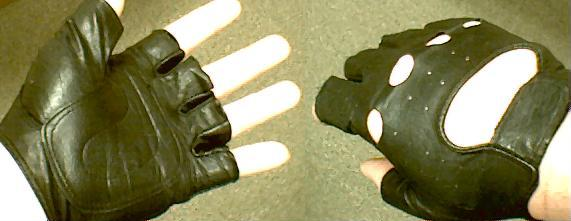
Leather fingerless gloves

Fingerless gloves or "glovelettes" are garments worn on the hands which resemble regular gloves in most ways, except that the finger columns are half-length and opened, allowing the top-half of the wearer's fingers to be shown.

Fingerless gloves are often padded in the palm area, to provide protection to the hand, and the exposed fingers do not interfere with sensation or gripping. In contrast to traditional full gloves, often worn for warmth, fingerless gloves will often have a ventilated back to allow the hands to cool; this is commonly seen in weightlifting gloves.

Fingerless gloves are worn by bicyclists and motorcyclists to better grip the handlebars, as well as by skateboarders and rollerbladers, to protect the palms of the hands and add grip in the event of a fall. Some anglers, particularly fly fishermen, favour fingerless gloves to allow manipulation of line and tackle in cooler conditions. Fingerless gloves are common among marching band members, particularly those who play the clarinet or open-hole flute, due to the difficulty of covering small holes while wearing gloves. The lack of fabric on the fingertips allows for better use of touchscreens, as on smartphones and tablet computers. Professional MMA fighters are required to wear fingerless gloves in fights.

== Leather gloves ==
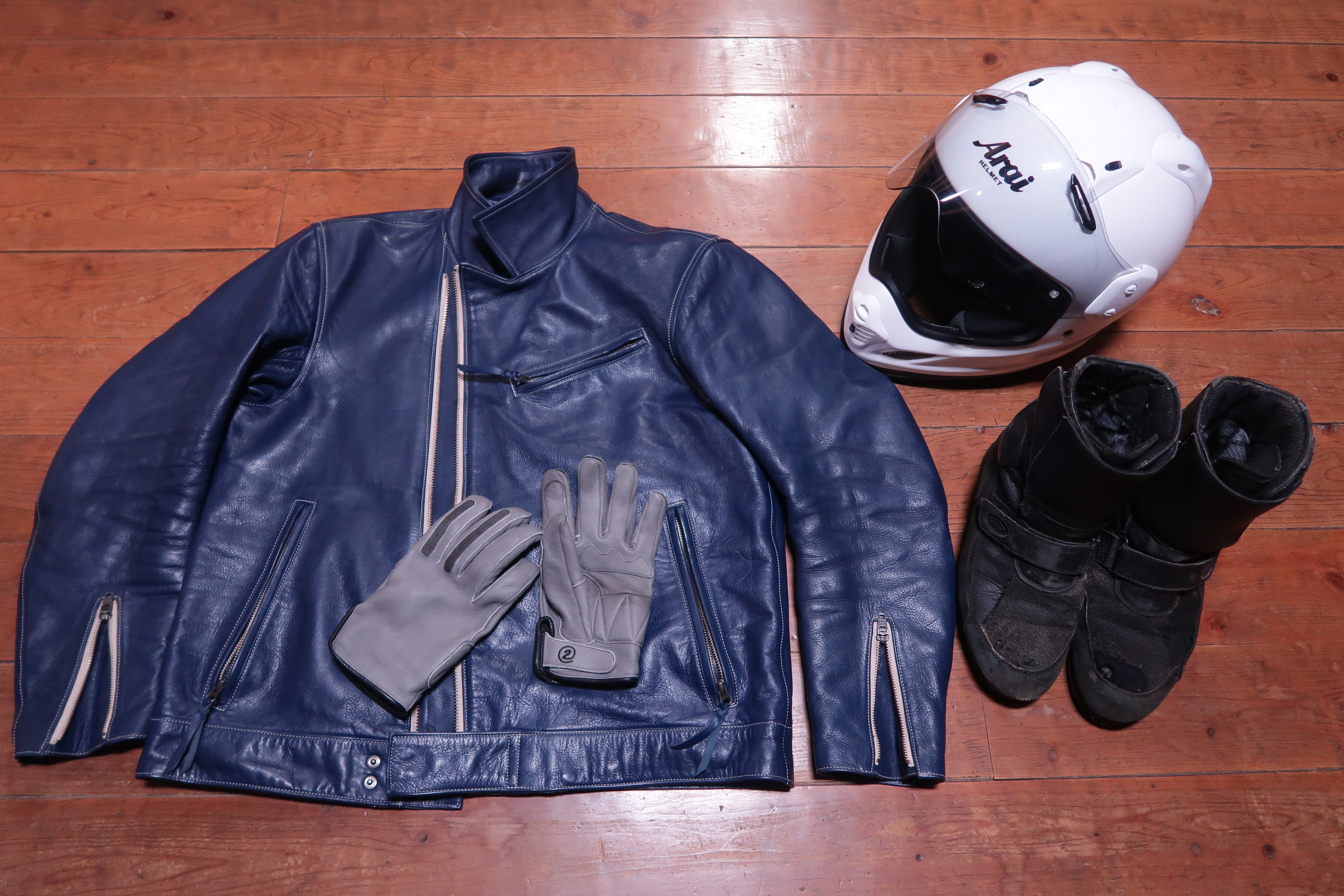
Motorcycle riding gloves, gray deerskin, some points reinforced

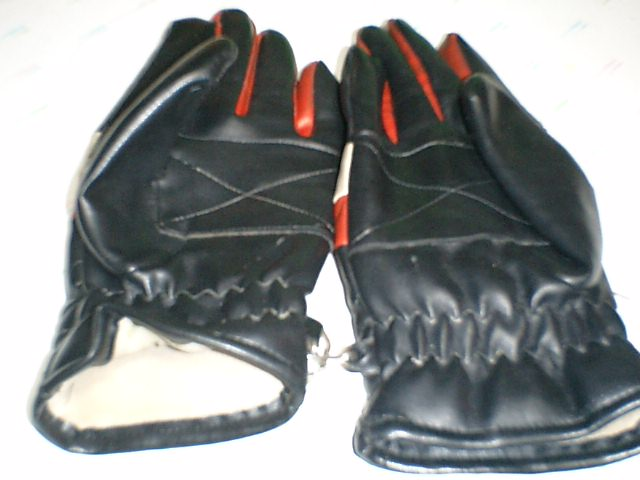
Lined black leather gloves with red leather fourchettes

=== Common uses ===
Leather gloves have been worn by people for thousands of years. The unique properties of leather allow for both a comfortable fit and useful grip for the wearer. The grain present on the leather and the pores present in the leather gives the gloves the unique ability to assist the wearer as they grip an object. As soft as a leather glove may be, its pores and grain provide a level of friction when "gripped" against an item or surface.

A common use for leather gloves is sporting events. In baseball, a baseball glove is an oversized leather glove with a web used for fielding the ball. Leather gloves are also used in handball, cycling, and American football.

Early Formula One racing drivers used steering wheels taken directly from road cars. They were normally made from wood, necessitating the use of driving gloves.

Leather gloves provide protection from occupational hazards. For example, beekeepers use leather gloves to avoid being stung by bees. Construction workers might use leather gloves for added grip and for protecting their hands. Welders use gloves too for protection against electrical shocks, extreme heat, ultraviolet and infrared.

Criminals have been known to wear leather gloves during the commission of crimes. Gloves are worn by criminals because the tactile properties of the leather allow for good grip and dexterity. These properties are the result of a grain present on the surface of the leather. The grain makes the surface of the leather unique to each glove. Investigators are able to dust for the glove prints left behind from the leather the same way in which they dust for fingerprints.

=== Leather dress gloves ===
==== Main types of gloving leather ====
Leather is a natural product with special characteristics that make it comfortable to wear, and give it great strength and flexibility. Because it is a natural product, with its own unique variations, every piece has its own individual characteristics. As they are worn and used, leather gloves (especially if they fit snugly) will conform to the wearer's hand. As this occurs the leather of the glove will become more malleable, and thus softer and more supple. This process is known as 'breaking-in' the glove. Over time wear spots may appear on certain parts of the palm and fingertips, due to the constant use of those areas of the glove. Creases and wrinkles will appear on the palm side of the leather glove and will generally correspond to the locations of the hinge joints of the wearer's hands, including the interphalangeal articulations of hand, metacarpophalangeal joints, intercarpal articulations, and wrists.

Because the leather is natural as well as delicate, the wearer must take precaution as to not damage them. The constant handling of damp or wet surfaces will discolor lighter-colored gloves and stiffen the leather of any glove. The wearer will often unknowingly damage or stain their gloves while doing such tasks as twisting a wet door knob or wiping a running nose with a gloved hand.

Leather dress gloves that are worn very tight and possess very short, elasticized wrists, are most often referred to as cop gloves or law enforcement gloves because of their prevalence as issued duty gloves for many law enforcement agencies. It is common attire in leather subculture and BDSM communities.

- Lambskin is widely used for fashion gloves and it is casual and country gloves. It is the most used material for gloves made in Europe in the known as French style.
- Cowhide is often used for lower-priced gloves. This leather is generally considered too thick and bulky for the majority of glove styles, particularly finer dress gloves. It is, however, used for some casual styles of glove.
- Deerskin has the benefit of great strength and elasticity, but has a more rugged appearance, with more grain on the surface, than "hairsheep". It is very hard-wearing and heavier in weight.
- Goatskin is occasionally used for gloves. It is hard-wearing but coarser than other leathers and is normally used for cheaper gloves.
- Hairsheep originates from sheep that grow hair, not wool. Hairsheep leather is finer and less bulky than other leathers. Its major benefits are softness of touch, suppleness, strength, and lasting comfort. It is very durable and is particularly suited for the manufacture of dress gloves.
- Peccary is the world's rarest and most luxurious gloving leather. Peccary leather is very soft, difficult to sew, and hard-wearing.
- Sheepskin, also called shearling, is widely used for casual and country gloves. It is very warm in cold weather, and as a leather reversed, it has still attached wool on the inside.
- Slink lamb is used only in the most expensive lambskin gloves. Some of the finest lambskin comes from New Zealand.

=== Leather glove linings ===
- Cashmere is warm, light in weight, and very comfortable to wear. Cashmere yarn comes from the hair of mountain goats, whose fleece allows them to survive the extreme weather conditions they are exposed to.
- Silk is warm in winter and cool in summer and is used both in men's and women's gloves, but is more popular in women's.
- Wool is well known for its natural warmth and comfort, as well as having a natural elasticity.
- Other linings, which include wool mixtures and acrylics.

==== Component parts ====
The component parts that may be found in a leather dress glove are one pair of tranks, one pair of thumbs, four whole fourchettes, four half fourchettes, two gussets, and six quirks. Depending on the style of the glove there may also be roller pieces, straps, rollers, eyelets, studs, sockets and domes. Finally, linings will themselves consist of tranks, thumbs and fourchettes.

==== Stitching ====
The most popular types of leather glove sewing stitches used today are:

- Hand stitched, which is most popular in men's gloves and some women's styles. Hand stitching is a very time-consuming and skilled process.
- Inseam, which is mainly used on women's gloves, but occasionally on men's dress gloves.

==== Some glove terms ====
- Button length is the measurement in inches that is used to determine the length/measurement from the base of the glove thumb to the cuff of the glove.
- Fourchettes are the inside panels on the fingers of some glove styles.
- Perforations are small holes that are punched in the leather. They are often added for better ventilation, grip, or aesthetics and can be as fine as a pin hole.
- Points are the three, or sometimes single, line of decorative stitching on the back of the glove.
- Quirks are found on only the most expensive hand sewn gloves. They are small diamond shaped pieces of leather sewn at the base of the fingers, where they are attached to the hand of the glove to improve the fit.
- A strap and roller is used to adjust the closeness of the fit around the wrist.
- A Vent is the V-shaped cut out of the glove, sometimes at the back, but more often on the palm, to give the glove an easier fit around the wrist.

=== Driving gloves ===
Driving gloves are designed for holding a steering wheel and transmitting the feeling of the road to the driver. They provide a good feel and protect the hands. They are designed to be worn tight and to not interfere with hand movements. The increased grip allows for more control and increased safety at speed.

True driver's gloves offer tactile advantages to drivers frequently handling a car near the limits of adhesion. Made of soft leather, drivers gloves are unlined with external seams.

== Safety standards ==
Several European standards relate to gloves. These include:

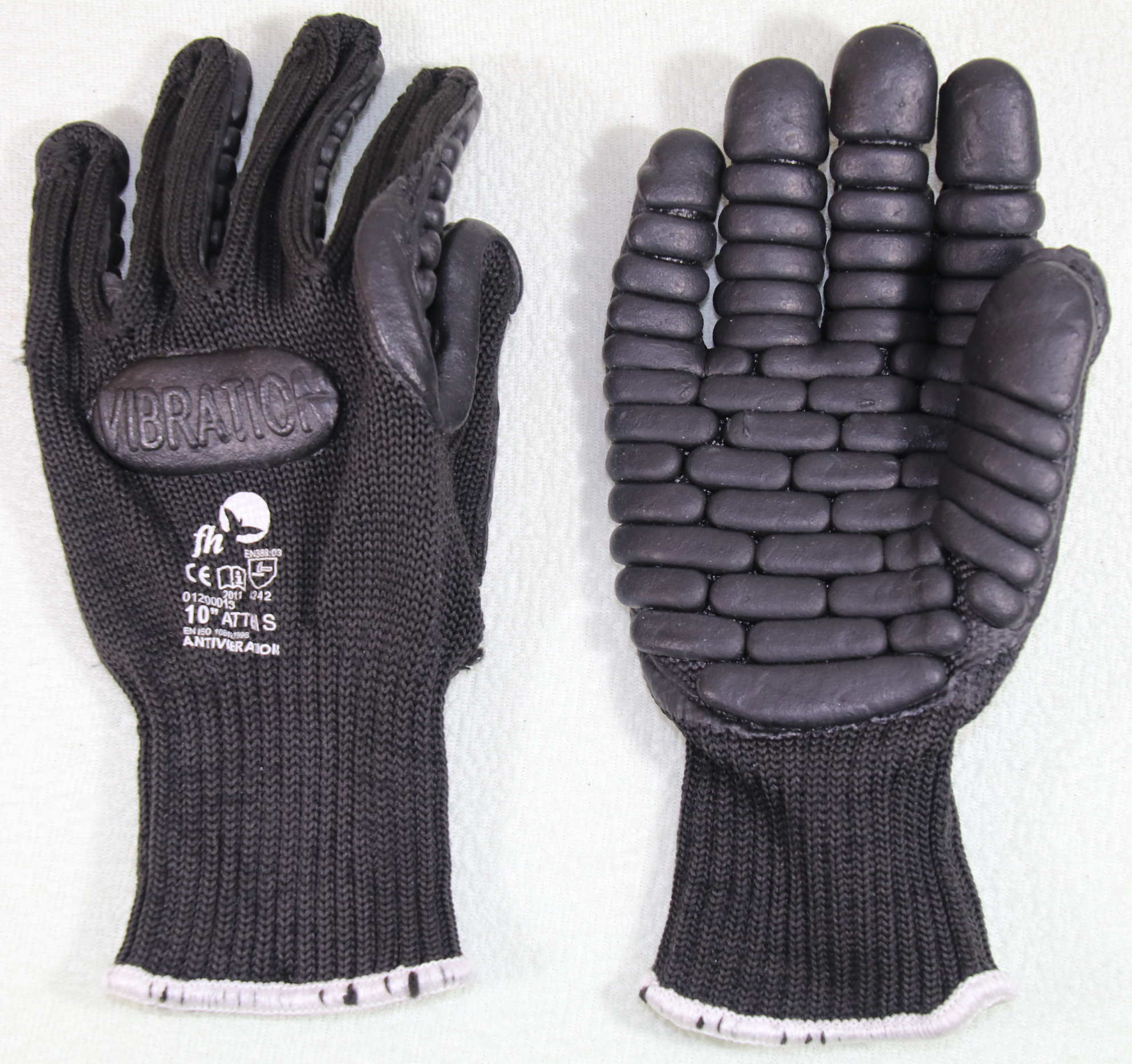
Antivibration protective gloves.

- EN 388: Protective against mechanical risks (abrasions/cuts/tears/punctures)
- EN 374: Protective against chemical and microorganisms
- EN 16523-1: Resistance of the glove material to permeation by potentially hazardous chemicals
- EN 420: General requirements for gloves includes sizing and a number of health and safety aspects including latex protein and chromium levels.
- EN ISO 21420: General requirements for protective gloves, the successor to EN 420
- EN 60903: Electric shock
- EN 407: Heat resistance
- EN 511: Cold resistance
- EN 1149: Antistatic on the surface
- EN 16350: Antistatic vertically
- EN 10819: Anti-vibration gloves (TRM – transmission ratio medium frequency range, TRH – transmission ratio high frequency range)

These exist to fulfill personal protective equipment (PPE) requirements.

== Notable gloves ==
Michael Jackson often wore a single jeweled glove on his right hand, which helped develop his signature look. It has been the object of several auctions.

A dark leather glove became an important piece of evidence in the O. J. Simpson murder case. Simpson's defense counsel famously quipped "if it doesn't fit, you must acquit". The glove presented as evidence shrank from having been soaked in blood, according to some analysis.

== See also ==
- Episcopal gloves (Catholic Church costumes)
- Glove sizes
- Latex allergy
- Mitten
