= Cricket clothing and equipment =

Sportwear and kit

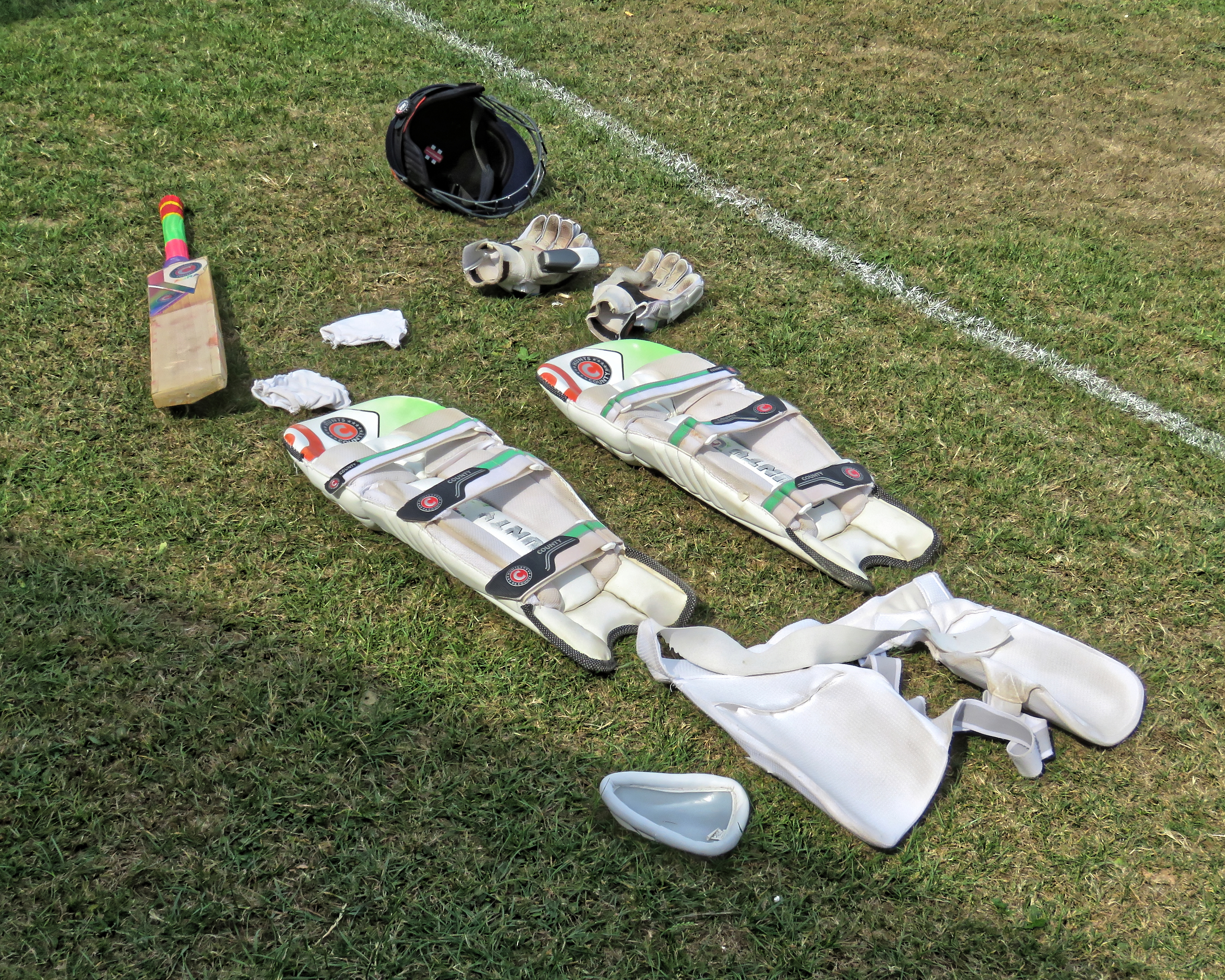
Cricket equipment at Southwater CC, in Southwater, West Sussex, England

Cricket clothing and equipment is regulated by the laws of cricket. Cricket whites, sometimes called flannels, are loose-fitting clothes that are worn while playing cricket so as not to restrict the player's movement. Use of protective equipment, such as cricket helmets, gloves and pads, is also regulated.

== Clothing and protective gear ==
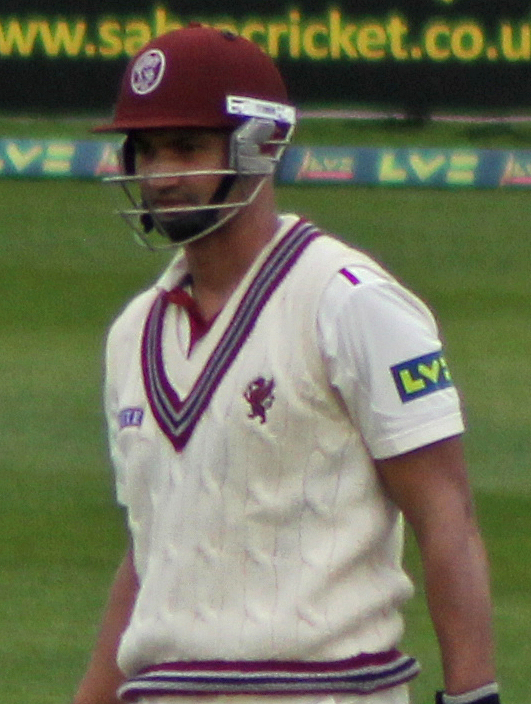
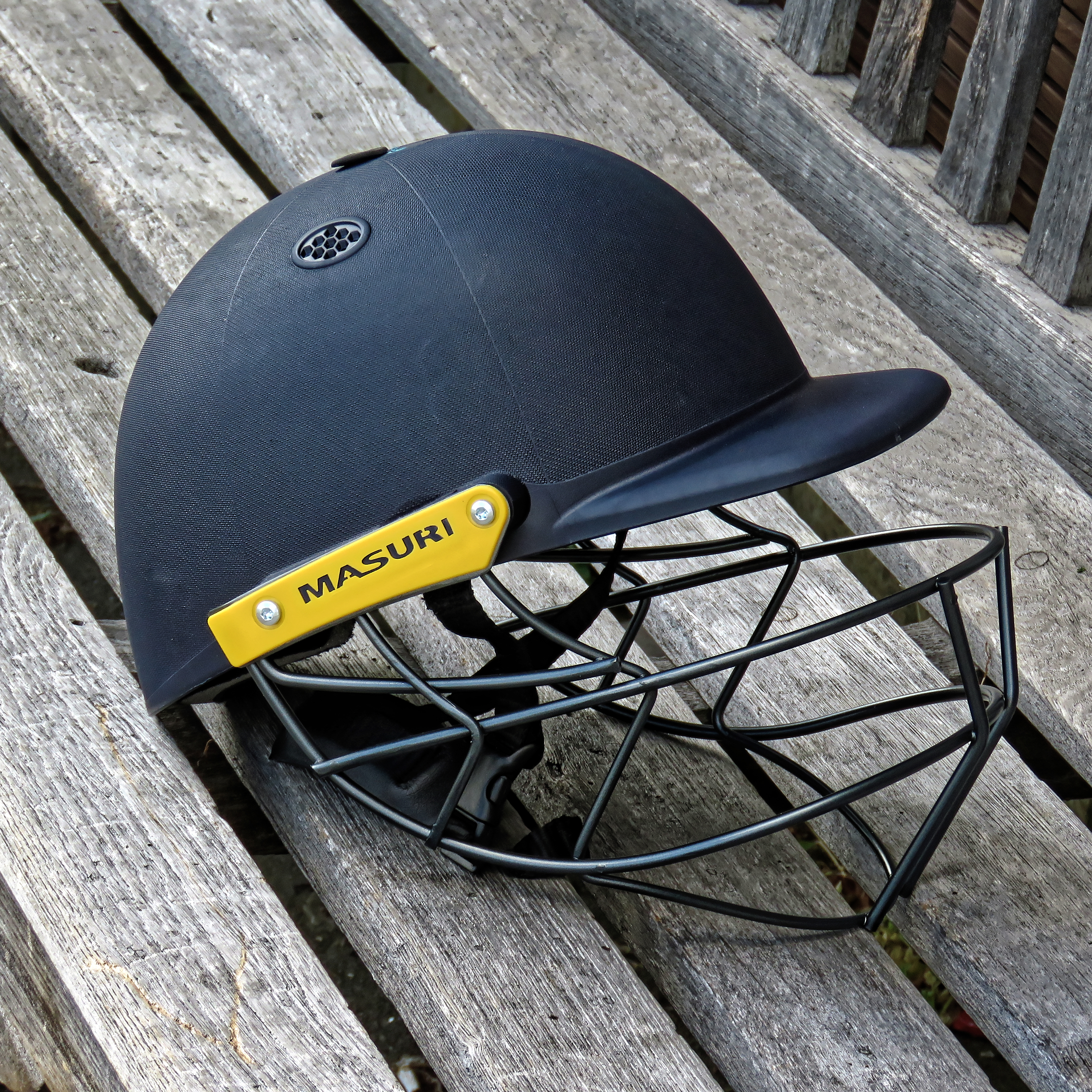
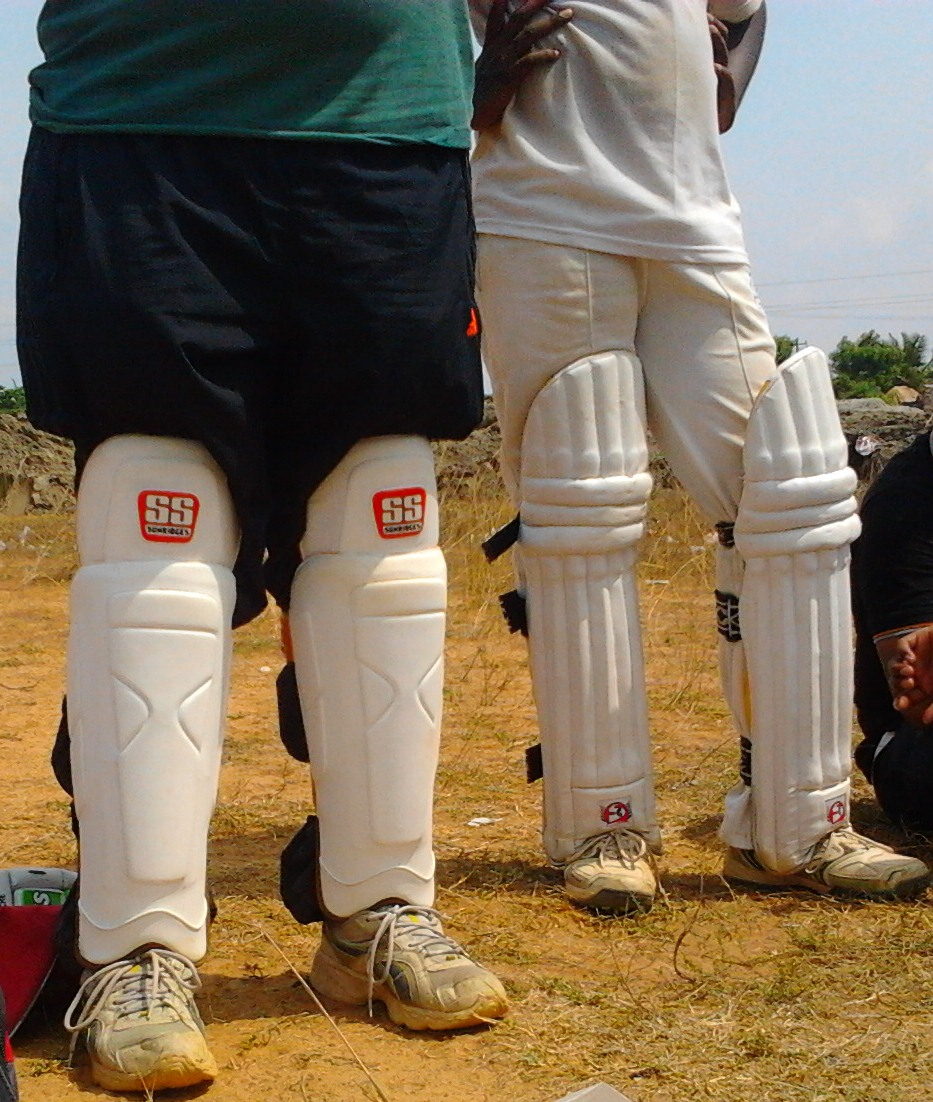
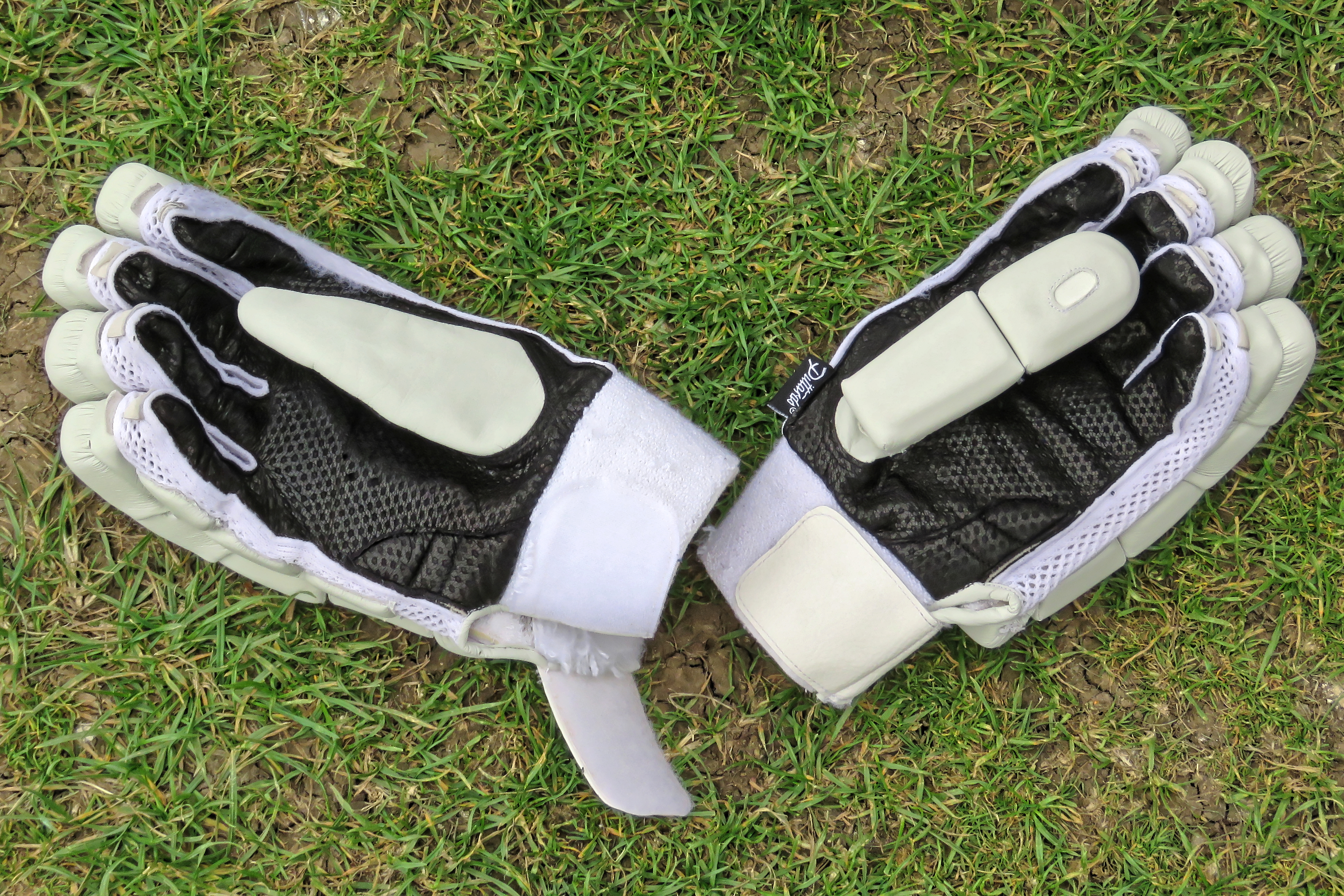
Fltr, clockwise: V-neck sweater (worn by South African Alviro Petersen); helmet, batting gloves, leg pads
- Collared shirt (white in tests and domestic; as per team kit in one-day formats) with short or long sleeves depending on the climate or personal preference.
- Long trousers (white in tests and domestic and first class cricket; as per team colour kit in one day format or T20).
- Sweater (a knitted jersey, if necessary). This may be long-sleeved or sleeveless (slipover).
- Sun hat, cricket cap or baseball cap during hot summer times
- Spiked shoes to increase traction.
- Protective equipment
  - Jockstrap with a cup pocket into which a "box", or protective cup, is inserted and held in place.
  - Abdominal guard or "box" for batsmen and wicket-keepers (often referred to as a cup or abdo guard). It is usually constructed from high-density plastic with a padded edge, shaped like a hollow half-pear, and inserted into the jockstrap with the cup pocket underwear of the batsmen and wicket-keeper. This is used to protect the crotch area against impact from the ball.
  - Helmet (often with a visor), worn by batsmen and fielders close to the batsman on strike to protect their heads.
  - Leg pads, worn by the two batsmen and the wicket-keeper, used to protect the shin bone against impact from the ball. The wicket-keeping pads are slightly different from the batsmen'. Fielders that are fielding close to the batsmen may wear shin guards under their trousers.
  - Thigh guards, arm guards, chest guards, and elbow guards protect the body of the batsmen. Some batsmen use these and others do not, since they reduce mobility.
  - Gloves for batsmen only, thickly padded above the fingers and on the thumb of the hand, to protect against impact from the ball.
  - Wicket-keeper's gloves for the wicket-keeper. Usually includes webbing between the thumb and index fingers.

Batsmen are allowed to wear gloves while batting. The batsman can also be caught out if the ball touches the glove instead of the bat, provided the hand is in contact with the bat. This is because the glove is considered to be the extension of the bat. The batsmen may also wear protective helmets, usually with a visor, to protect themselves. Helmets are usually employed when facing fast bowlers. While playing spinners, they might not be used (though injuries are still possible).

Fieldsmen cannot use gloves to field the ball. If they wilfully use any part of their clothing to field the ball they may be penalised five penalty runs to the opposition. If the fielders are fielding close to the batsman, they are allowed to use helmets and leg guards worn under their clothing.

As the wicket-keeper is positioned directly behind the batsman, and therefore has the ball bowled directly at him, they are the only fielder allowed to wear gloves and (external) leg guards.

Cricket clothing is generally white in Test cricket, as is traditional, but limited-overs cricket players generally wear clothing based on team colours, similar to other sports.

== Equipment ==
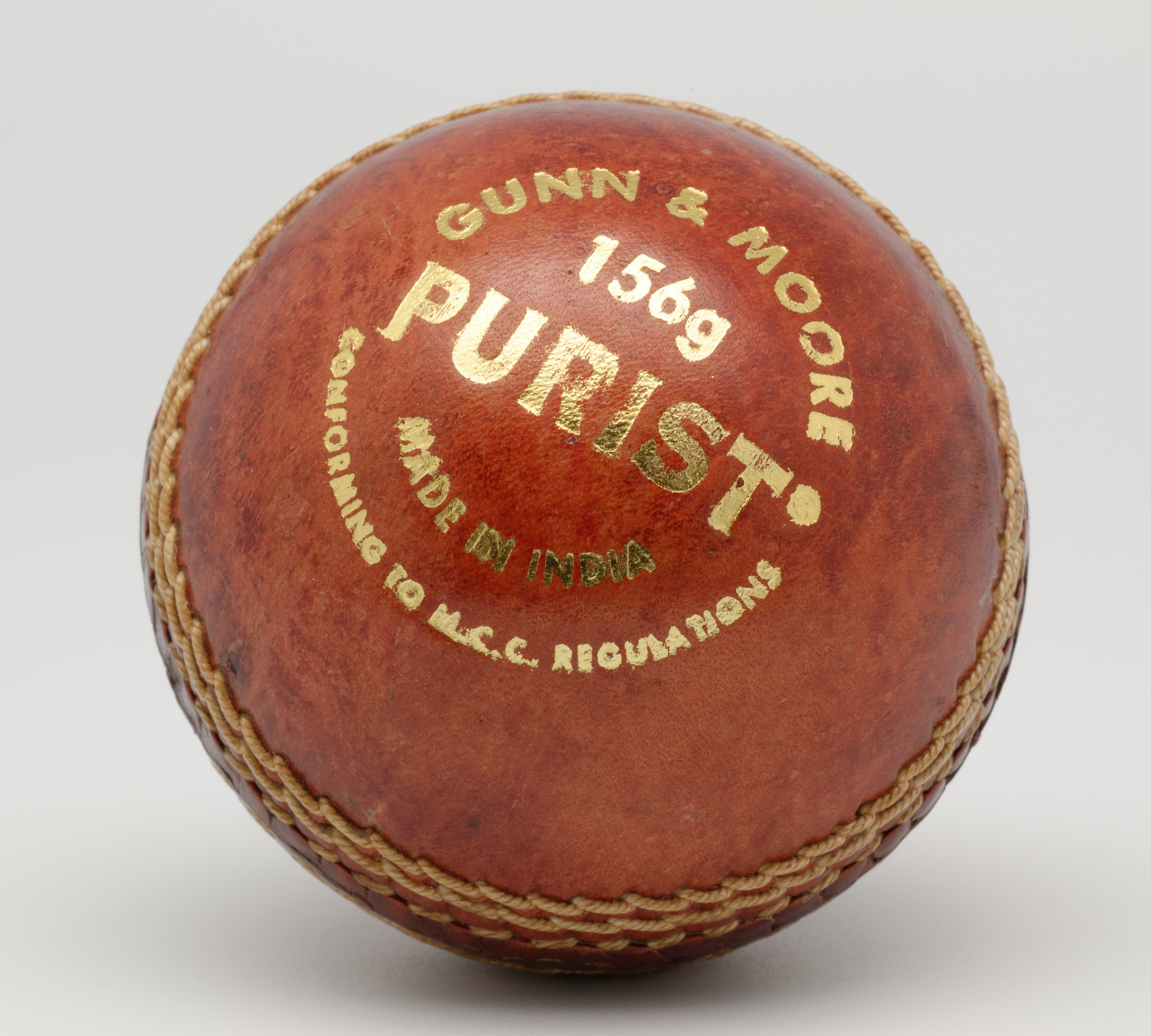
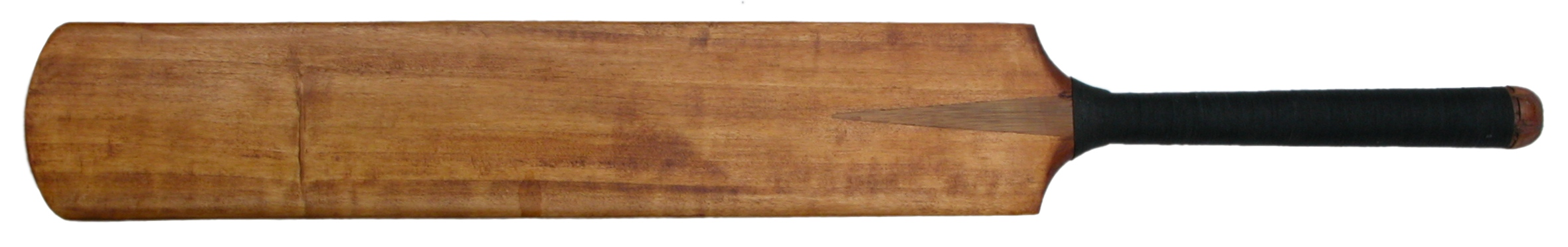
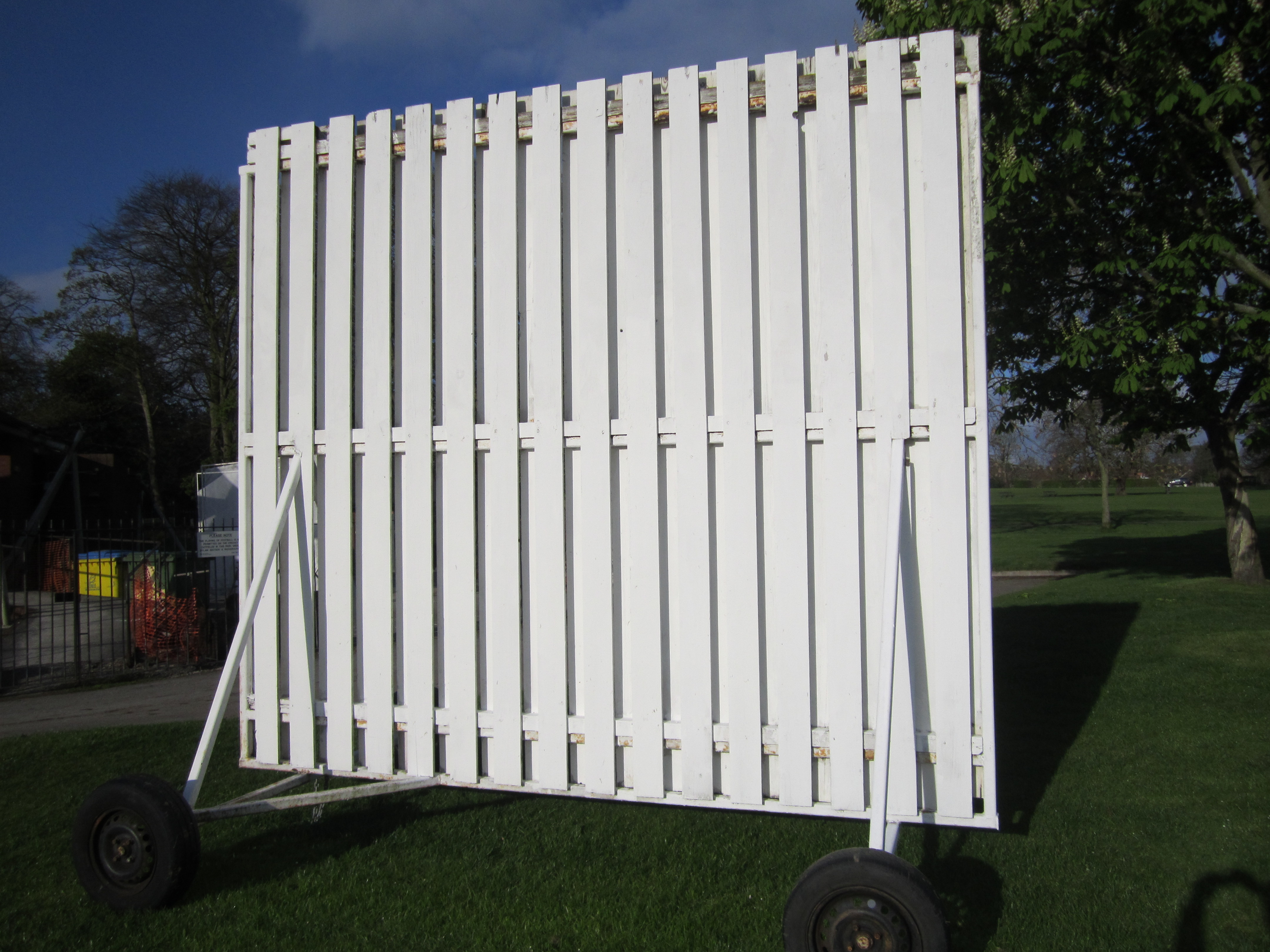
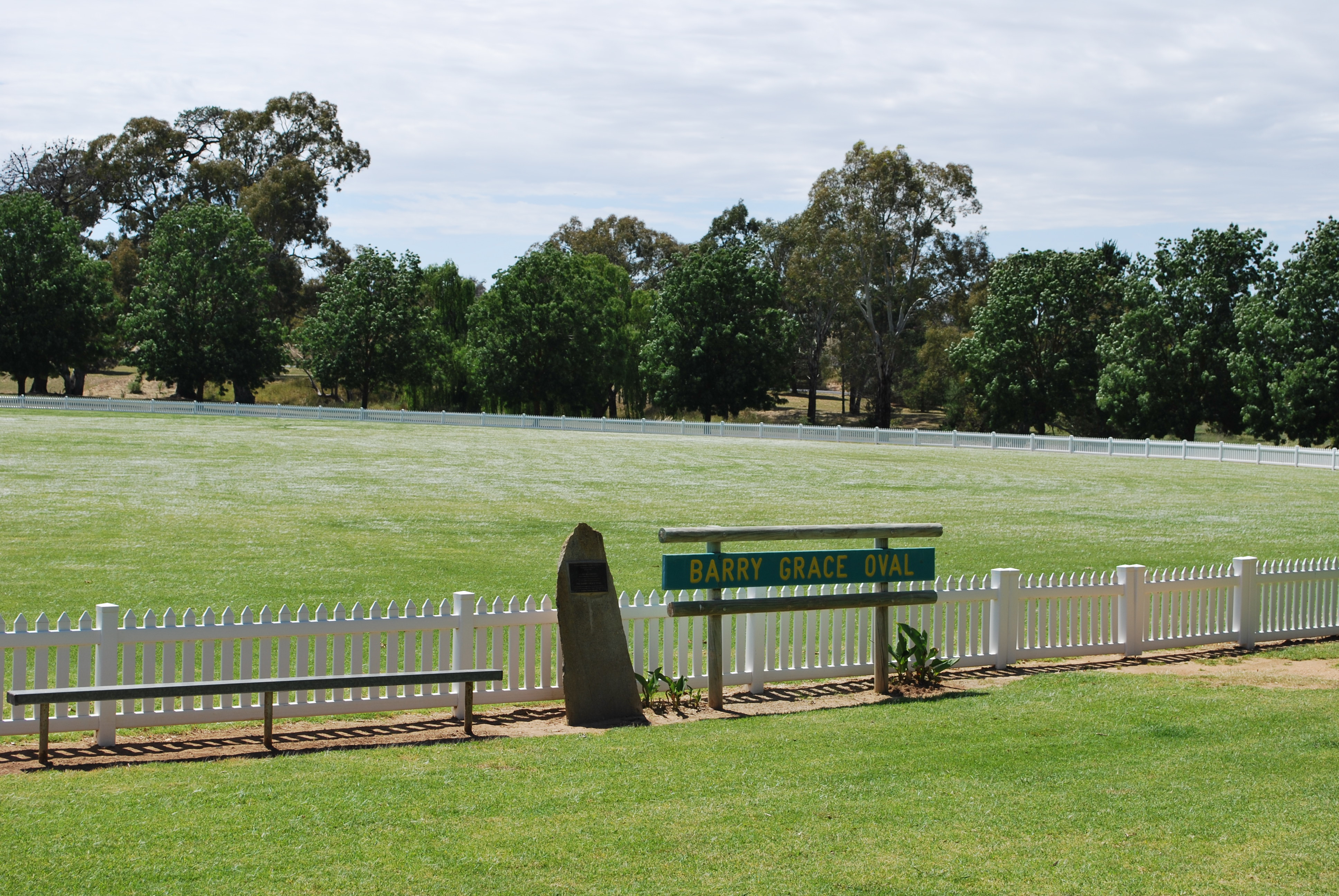
Fltr, clockwise: Cricket ball, bat, boundary (picket fence), sightscreen
- Ball – A red, white or pink ball with a cork base, wrapped in twine covered with leather. The ball should have a circumference of 9.1 in (23 centimetres) unless it is a children's size.
- Bat – A wooden bat is used. The wood used is from the Kashmir or English willow tree. The bat cannot be more than 38 inches (96.5 cm) long and 4.25 inches (10.8 cm) wide. Aluminium bats are not allowed. The bat has a long handle and one side has a smooth face.
- Stumps – Three upright wooden poles that, together with the bails, form the wicket.
- Bails – Two crosspieces made of wood, placed on top of the stumps.
- Sight screen – A screen placed at the boundary known as the sight screen. This is aligned exactly parallel to the width of the pitch and behind both pairs of wickets.

== See also ==
- Street cricket
- Sports uniform
