= Weightlifting gloves =

Weightlifting gloves are gloves worn by weightlifters. These gloves provide extra grip strength to the wearer by mitigating friction from the bar and to reduce the potential for injury.

== Types of gloves ==
Half-fingered gloves with wrist pads

The most common type of weightlifting gloves. They may provide more stability and support to the wrists and reduce calluses. Depending on the material, they may be less breathable.

Full finger gloves

These gloves cover the entire surface of the hand including the palms and fingers. They help protect the entire hand but may be less breathable than half finger or fingerless gloves, depending on their material. They often come with a wrist strap for support.

Fingerless gloves with an extended pad and wrist support

Offers similar support to half-fingered gloves. They may offer more flexibility, and are open to the back of the hand.

Grip pads

This type of glove only covers the palm of the hand, which may help prevent sweating and slipping. Some products may have additional wrist support.

Palm less gloves

This type only covers the fingers and may not extend all the way to the fingertip.

Ventilated Gloves

These gloves have open back and mesh which helps to reduce sweating. One thing to keep in mind that these gloves are not for heavy lifters.
