= Wicket-keeper's gloves =

Large leather gloves worn by cricket players

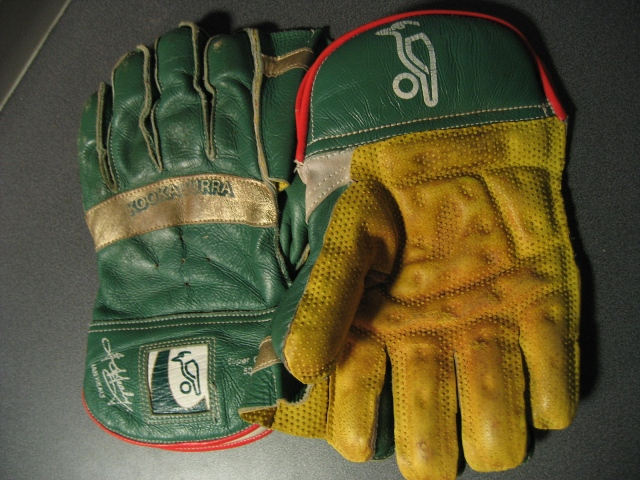
A pair of wicket-keeper's gloves. The webbing which helps the keeper to catch the ball can be seen between the thumb and index fingers.

Wicket-keeper's gloves are large gloves used in cricket and worn by the wicket-keeper of the fielding team, which protect the hands of the wicket-keeper when catching balls bowled by the bowler, hit by a batter or thrown by a fielder.

== Construction ==
Wicket-keeper's gloves have an anterior surface designed for catching the ball, while offering protection to fingers and the palms of the hands from painful impact. Typically, the catching surface is made of rubber and has some traction-enhancing features, such as bumps. The catching surface is yellow-coloured in the image shown above. Soft padding material is placed underneath the catching surface to reduce the impact of the ball. A protective padded cuff covering the wrist area is also present on the anterior surface, but it is typically encased with leather and does not offer a catching surface. This is the green, semi-circular piece on the glove to the right in the picture above. The posterior of the glove, which is not intended for contact with the ball, is made of leather and appears as the green backing of the glove on the left side in the picture shown. Inside the glove, rubber thimbles are used to protect fingertip from injury due to impact from the ball.

== Legal specifications ==
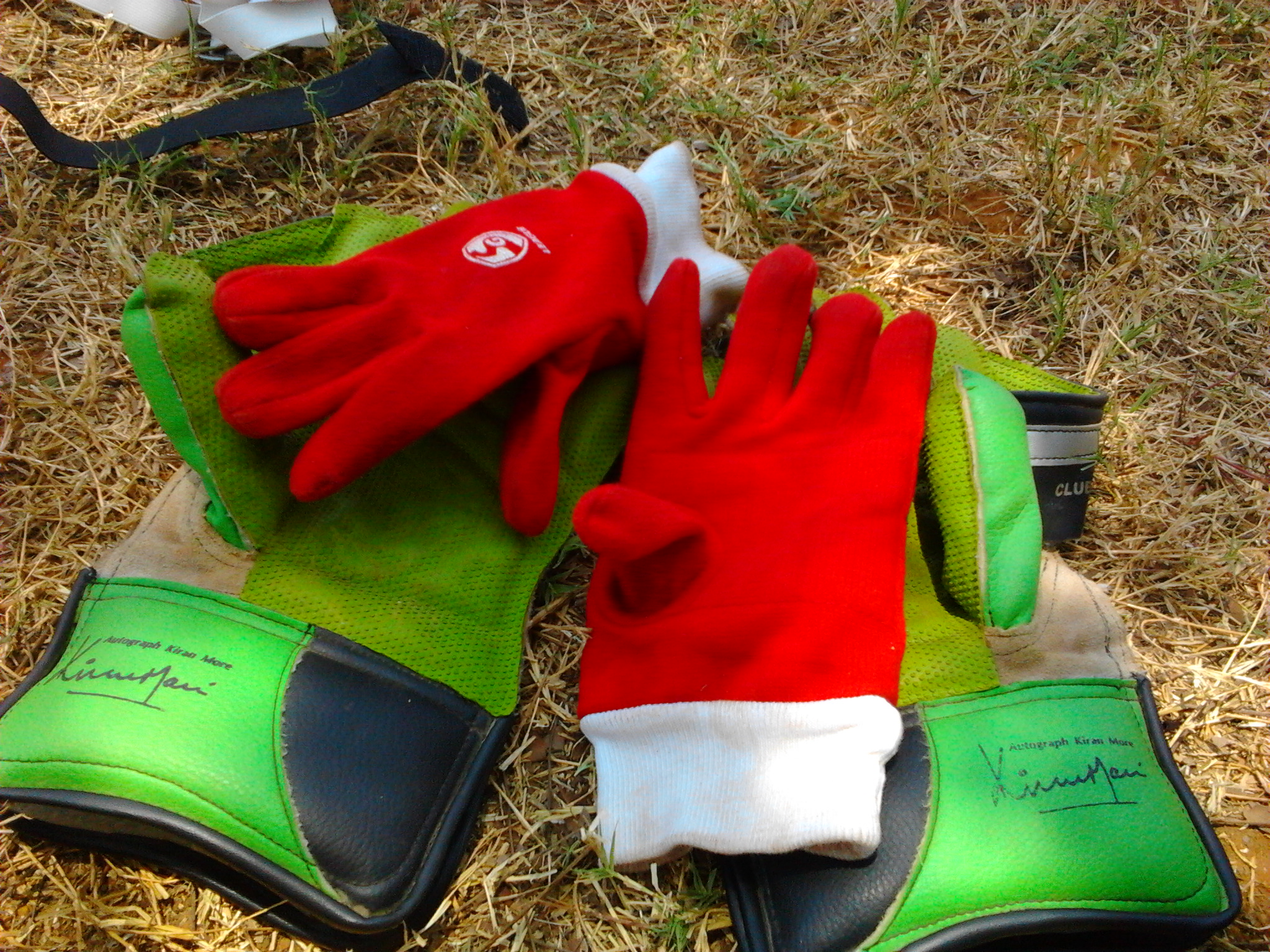
Wicket-keeper's gloves along with the inner gloves

The Laws of Cricket as set by Marylebone Cricket Club dictate the specifications for wicket-keeper's gloves in Law 27.2:

"27.2.1: If ... the wicket-keeper wears gloves, they shall have no webbing between the fingers except joining index finger and thumb, where webbing may be inserted as a means of support.

27.2.2: If used, the webbing shall be a single piece of non-stretch material which, although it may have facing material attached, shall have no reinforcements or tucks.

27.2.3: The top edge of the webbing shall not protrude beyond the straight line joining the top of the index finger to the top of the thumb and shall be taut when a hand wearing the glove has the thumb fully extended."

== Incidents and anecdotes ==
In 2008, Mahendra Singh Dhoni was instructed by the match referee in an Australia-India game at the Sydney Cricket Ground to change his wicket-keeper's gloves, which were deemed to be in violation of the specifications. Again in 2019, ICC asked Dhoni to remove an Indian army insignia from his gloves.

Wicket-keepers have been known to have a special bond with their equipment. Alan Knott, the legendary England wicket-keeper, is known to have worn his gloves in the evening at home to keep them supple. Jack Russell, yet another notable English keeper, allegedly slept with his gloves underneath his pillow.

Knott is also known to have reinforced the protection offered by his gloves by taping pieces of plasticine to his inner gloves. There are known incidents of some wicket-keepers that used to insert beef steaks inside their gloves for added padding.

== See also ==
- Cricket clothing and equipment
- Baseball glove
