= Batting glove =

Sportswear item

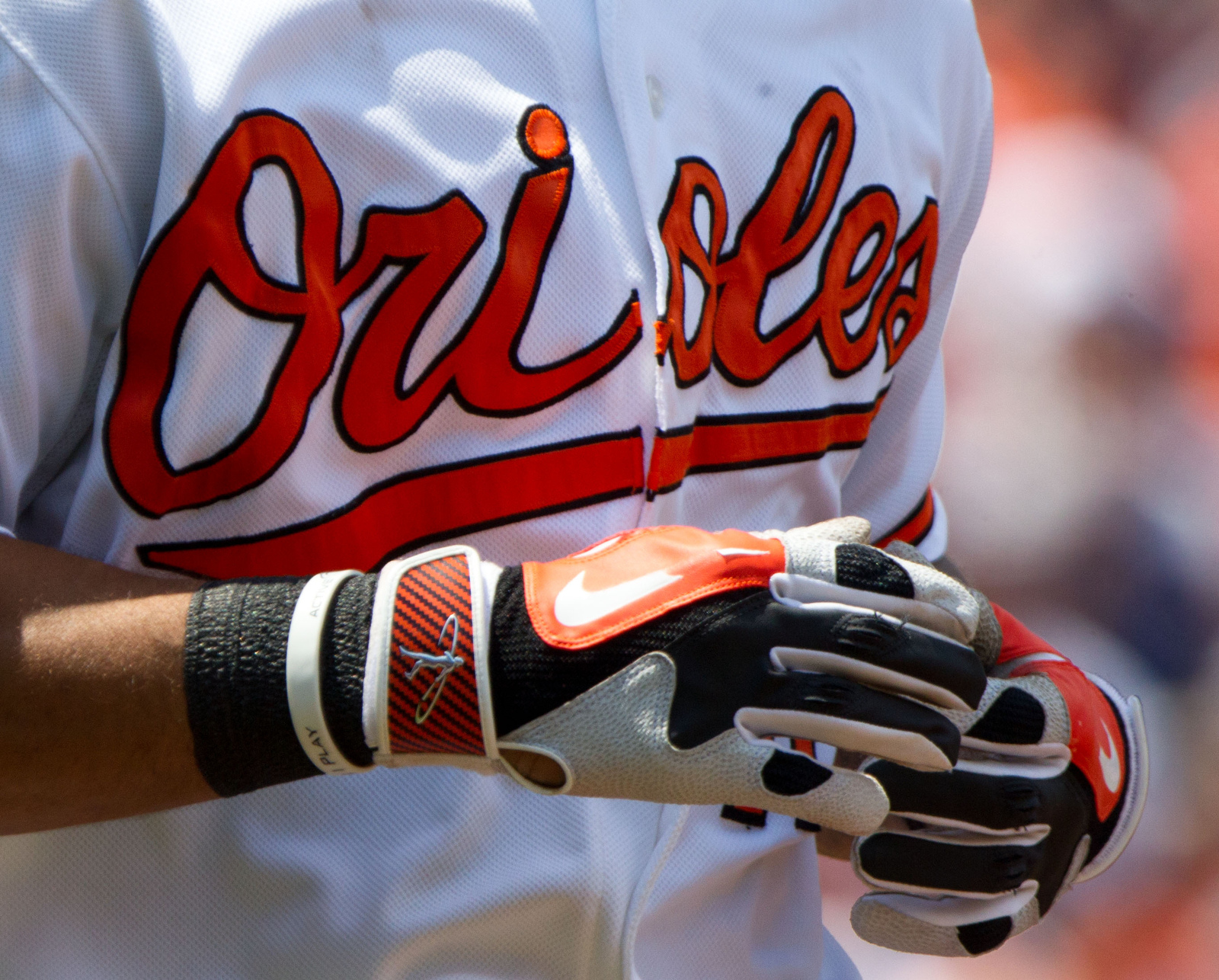
A close-up of a Baltimore Orioles player's batting gloves

Batting gloves are a component in bat-and-ball games sportswear. Typically consisting of a leather palm and back made of nylon or another synthetic fabric, the glove covers one or both hands of a batter, providing comfort, prevention of blisters, warmth, improved grip, and shock absorption when hitting the ball. Batting gloves are considered an essential part of cricket equipment, though they are not mandatory at any level of the game.

== Purpose ==
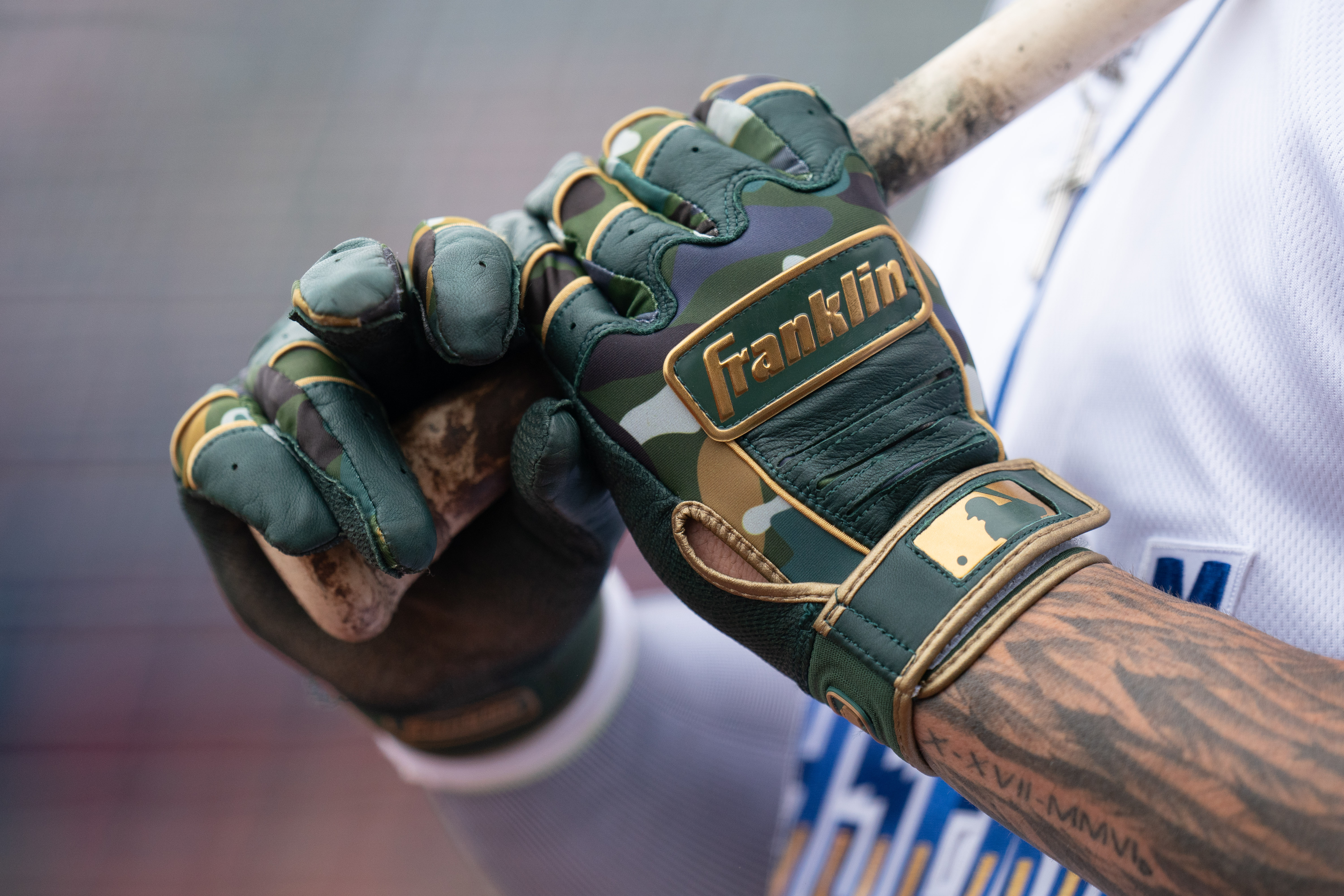
Kyle Isbel of the Omaha Storm Chasers grips a bat using gloves during a 2021 game

The majority of professional and high-level amateur baseball players wear batting gloves. They are worn because they help increase the quality of the grip on the bat. Maintaining a tight and controlled grip is essential to successful hits. Even the slightest slip or variation in grip can cost the team greatly. They also act as a protector of the hand when one slides into a base. Another prime use for batting gloves, especially in amateur leagues that permit aluminum bats, is shock protection. On a cold day, a swing can fracture fingers.

== History in baseball ==
While Ken Harrelson is often credited with being the first Major League player to wear a batting glove when he did so in the 1960s, the use of gloves dates to at least the late 1800s. An early example is Tom Brown of the 1897 Washington Senators wearing his fielding glove while batting to protect and injured hand; in that era, fielding gloves were smaller, softer and lacking webbing, making this unintended usage possible.

In his book A Game of Inches, baseball historian Peter Morris wrote that a batting glove may have been used as early as 1901 by Hughie Jennings, who had a knack for being hit by pitches. "Hughey Jennings has lots of fun flirting that big glove of his into the ball, and many a time he was made a present to first when he was no more entitled to it than a Kohinoor," wrote John B. Foster of The Sporting Life. Morris wrote that this "seems to indicate that Jennings wore some form of glove while batting." Also in 1901, Frank Butler, playing his final professional season for the minor league Chattanooga Lookouts, wore a batting glove to protect a sore hand.

In 1932, The Sporting News reported that Lefty O'Doul and Johnny Frederick of the Brooklyn Dodgers both wore batting gloves to protect injured hands, with O'Doul wearing an ordinary street glove and Frederick supplementing his with bandages and padding. The same year, Detroit Tigers rookie catcher Hughie Wise advocated wearing golf gloves while batting to improve grip and protect from bruising, but doubted they would ever become widespread. "Baseball is a conservative sport and if a fellow went to bat wearing gloves someone would call him a Bolshevik or a sissy," he told the Detroit Free Press.

In 1949, The News Tribune wrote that Boston Braves outfielder Marv Rickert "introduced something new to baseball—the use of a golf glove while hitting." Rickert, nursing a broken thumb, happened upon a golf glove in sporting goods store, and found that it improved his grip while padding his injured finger. After a successful 1948 minor league season wearing the glove with the Triple-A Milwaukee Brewers, he introduced the idea to the Braves' athletic trainer in 1949, who ordered a supply for the club. "The gloves are now worn by several major leaguers," the report said.

In the 1940s and 1950s, many players wore gloves while batting in Major League games, including Birdie Tebbetts, Marv Rickert, Vic Wertz, Roy Campanella, Bobby Ávila, Frank Thomas, and Johnny Temple. Bobby Thomson, Ted Williams, Willie Mays, and Gil Hodges wore them in batting practice.

Morris does, however, credit Harrelson and Rusty Staub with helping to popularize batting gloves, which were ubiquitous by the late 1970s.

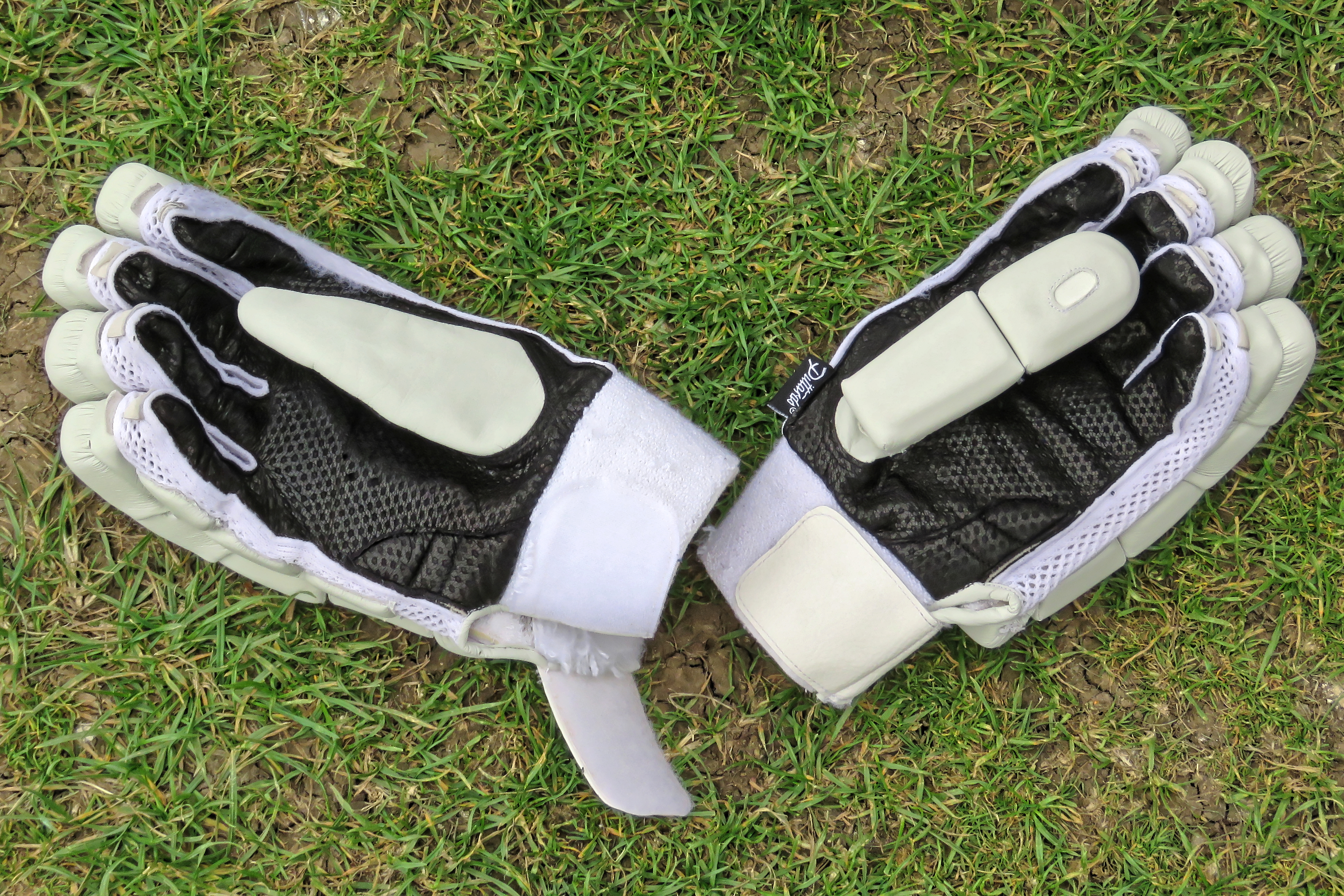
Cricket batting gloves

== Use in cricket ==
Batting gloves are considered an essential part of cricket equipment, though they are not mandatory at any level of the game. They are thickly padded above the fingers and on the thumb of the hand, to protect against impact from the ball. The batsman can be also caught out if the ball touches the glove instead of the bat, provided the hand is in contact with the bat. This is because the glove is considered to be the extension of the bat.

== See also ==
- Golf gloves
- Baseball clothing and equipment
- Cricket clothing and equipment
