= Canterbury of New Zealand =

New Zealand sports equipment brand

- Type: Subsidiary
- Industry: Textile, sports equipment
- Founded: 1904; 122 years ago
- Founder: J. Lane, P. Walker, A. Rudkin
- Headquarters: Auckland, New Zealand
- Area served: Worldwide
- Products: Rugby equipment, clothing
- Revenue: ▲$37.1 million (2024)
- Operating income: ▲£20.5 million (2015)
- Net income: ▲£220,000 (2015)
- Total assets: ▲£107,000 (2015)
- Total equity: ▲-£7.2 million (2015)
- Parent: Pentland Group (2012–present)
- Website: canterbury.com

Canterbury of New Zealand (commonly referred to simply as Canterbury) is a New Zealand sports equipment manufacturing company focused on rugby. The company originated from the Canterbury region in New Zealand.

Canterbury of New Zealand was established in 1904, producing garments in Canterbury, New Zealand. The company made military uniforms during the First World War, before producing kit for the All Blacks. The brand's tagline is "Committed To The Game". Its logo features the silhouettes of three kiwi birds, creating the letters CCC, which represent the initials of the Canterbury Clothing Company and symbolize the three people who founded the company.

The head office is in Avondale, Auckland, New Zealand; the global headquarters are located in London, UK; and satellite offices in Sydney, Australia.

Rugby products manufactured by Canterbury include jersey uniforms, protection (head protectors and mouthguards), boots, and balls. The company also produces casual wear clothing (shorts, t-shirts, polo shirts, pants, jackets, hoodies, socks), and accessories (bags, backpacks, hats, scarves)

== History ==
A Canterbury clothing label from around the 1970s

Canterbury of New Zealand was established in 1904 by three English immigrants, John Lane, Pringle Walker and Alfred Rudkin. The company began producing garments in Canterbury, New Zealand. Canterbury then began making uniforms for the New Zealand and Australian armies during the First World War. Later, the brand was approached to make rugby attire for the All Blacks.

In 2006, Canterbury sold its South African operations to investment group House of Monatic, which set up Canterbury South Africa to run these operations under licence.

The European arm, Canterbury Europe Ltd, based in Stockport, was purchased by JD Sports in 2009, then sold on in 2012 to sports and fashion retail group Pentland Group for £22.7m.

== Sponsorships ==
=== Cricket ===
==== Club teams ====
- (England) Durham

=== Football ===
==== Club teams ====
- (England) Buxton

=== Rugby union ===
==== National teams ====
- British and Irish Lions
- Belgium
- Gibraltar
- Ireland
- Japan
- Poland
- Eswatini

==== Club teams ====
- (Argentina) Alumni
- (Argentina) Champagnat
- (Argentina) Ateneo Cultural y Deportivo Don Bosco
- (Argentina) Hindú Club
- (Argentina) Dogos XV
- (Argentina) Pampas XV
- (Argentina) Buenos Aires Cricket & Rugby Club
- (Argentina) Club Newman
- (Argentina) Club Pucará
- (Argentina) San Isidro Club
- (Australia) Brothers Sunshine Coast
- (Australia) Noosa Dolphins
- (Australia) Queensland Reds
- (Brazil) SPAC
- (England) Cambridge R.U.F.C.
- (England) Richmond F.C.
- (England) London Scottish F.C.
- (Germany) Berlin Irish RFC
- (Italy) Mogliano
- (Italy) Parma (From 2023 -2024 season)
- (Italy) Petrarca Rugby
- (Italy) Udine
- (Japan) Sunwolves
- (Japan) Toshiba Brave Lupus
- (South Korea) Samsung Heavy Industries
- (South Korea) Seoul Survivors
- (New Zealand) Taranaki
- (Netherlands) Rotterdamse Studenten
- (Netherlands) Leidsch Studenten Rugby Gezelschap
- (Sri Lanka) Ceylonese RFC
- (Sri Lanka) Kandy
- (South Africa) Falcons
- (South Africa) Griffons
- (South Africa) Golden Lions
- (United States) Washington Irish

==== Associations ====
- (United Kingdom) Royal Navy RU
- (United Kingdom) Royal Air Force RU
- (New Zealand) Auckland RU

=== Rugby league ===
==== Club teams ====
- (Australia) Wests Tigers

== Former sponsorships ==
- New Zealand Black Caps
- New Zealand All Blacks
- (New Zealand) Blues
- (New Zealand) Chiefs
- (New Zealand) Crusaders
- (New Zealand) Highlanders
- (New Zealand) Hurricanes
- (New Zealand) Auckland Rugby Football Union
- (New Zealand) Manawatu Rugby
- (New Zealand) Waikato Rugby
- (New Zealand) Otago rugby
- (New Zealand) North Harbour Rugby
- (New Zealand) Counties Manukau Rugby
- New Zealand Warriors (NRL team)
- Scotland
- (Scotland) Glasgow Warriors
- South Africa
- (South Africa) Lions
- (South Africa) Sharks
- (South Africa) Cheetahs
- (South Africa) Southern Kings
- England
- (England) Bath Rugby
- (England) Oxford University Rugby
- Russia
- (Ireland) Leinster Rugby
- (Ireland) Munster Rugby
- (Ireland) Ulster Rugby
- (Wales) Cardiff Blues
- (Wales) Ospreys
- (England) Leicester Tigers
- (Japan) Suntory Sungoliath
- Canada
- Spain
- Italy
- Fiji
- Namibia
- Samoa
- Tonga
- Australia Wallabies
- Australia Kangaroos
- (Australia) Canberra Raiders
- (Australia) Canterbury-Bankstown Bulldogs
- (Australia) Melbourne Storm
- (Australia) Newcastle Knights
- (Australia) North Queensland Cowboys
- (Australia) Parramatta Eels
- (Australia) St George Dragons
- (Australia) St George Illawarra Dragons
- (Australia) Melbourne Football Club
- (Australia) North Melbourne Kangaroos
- (Australia) Western Bulldogs
- (Australia) Brumbies
- (Australia) Waratahs
- (France) Lille OSC
- (England) Portsmouth
- (Spain) Deportivo de La Coruña
- (Netherlands) AZ Alkmaar
- (New Zealand) Football Kingz
- Sri Lanka Navy Sports Club
- (Sri Lanka) Trinity College, Kandy
- Royal College Colombo Sri Lanka

== See also ==
- Rugby shirt
