= Gilbert Rugby =

Sports equipment company

- Type: Private
- Industry: Sports equipment
- Founded: 1823 in Rugby, England
- Founder: William Gilbert
- Headquarters: Robertsbridge, UK
- Area served: Worldwide
- Products: Rugby union and netball equipment and accessories
- Parent: Grays International
- Website: gilbertrugby.com

Gilbert Rugby is a British sports equipment manufacturing brand, specialising in rugby union and netball. The company is mostly known for its rugby union balls, having been official supplier for every World Cup since 1995.

== History ==
One of the oldest sports companies in the world, the company was established by William Gilbert, a cobbler, in 1823, who along with his nephew, James, developed footballs for the neighbouring Rugby School. In 2002, after experiencing financial difficulties following a management buyout, Gilbert was purchased by Grays International.

Gilbert is the long-standing official ball supplier for the England, Wales, Scotland, Australia, South Africa, France, Italy and Argentina rugby unions. They also provide balls for World Netball. Gilbert is the official ball supplier of the ANZ Championship, the biggest netball competition in the world, and also the official supplier of the Netball World Championships. Their products include the Gilbert Synergie rugby ball.

In September 2014, Gilbert Rugby launched the "Match-XV" ball, which was developed specifically for the 2015 World Cup held in England. The Match-XV match ball was used throughout the Premiership Rugby, Top 14 and by all Gilbert-sponsored national unions in the test matches in November 2015.

== Products ==
The following table details products manufactured and commercialised by Gilbert for rugby union and netball markets.

Sport	Range of products
Rugby union	Balls, kit uniforms (jerseys/shorts/socks), protective gear (body armors, shoulder pads, head guards, scrum caps, mouthguards, gloves), boots, compression garments, bags, safety cones, tees, water bottles, tackle bags
Netball	Balls, Uniform equipment, footwear, post, rings

== Sponsorships ==
The following teams, associations and players wear uniforms and equipment provided by Gilbert:

=== Rugby ===
==== National teams ====
- Belgium
- (United Arab Emirates) UAE

==== Club teams ====
- (Brazil) Pasteur Athletique Club
- (New Zealand) Otago (National Provincial Championship)
- (Wales) Dragons/Newport
- (England) Berkshire Shire Hall RFC
- (England) Bedford Blues
- (England) Barbarian F.C.

==== Players ====
- (England) Mat Gilbert
- (France) Thierry Dusautoir
- (Ireland) Seán Cronin
- (Ireland) Matthew Dempsey
- (Scotland) Blair Cowan
- (South Africa) Cheslin Kolbe
- (Wales) Jake Ball
- (Wales) Aaron Shingler
- (Wales) Richard Hibbard
- (Australia) Michael Hooper

=== Netball ===
- Australia
- Jamaica
- New Zealand
