= Rugby socks =

Sport socks

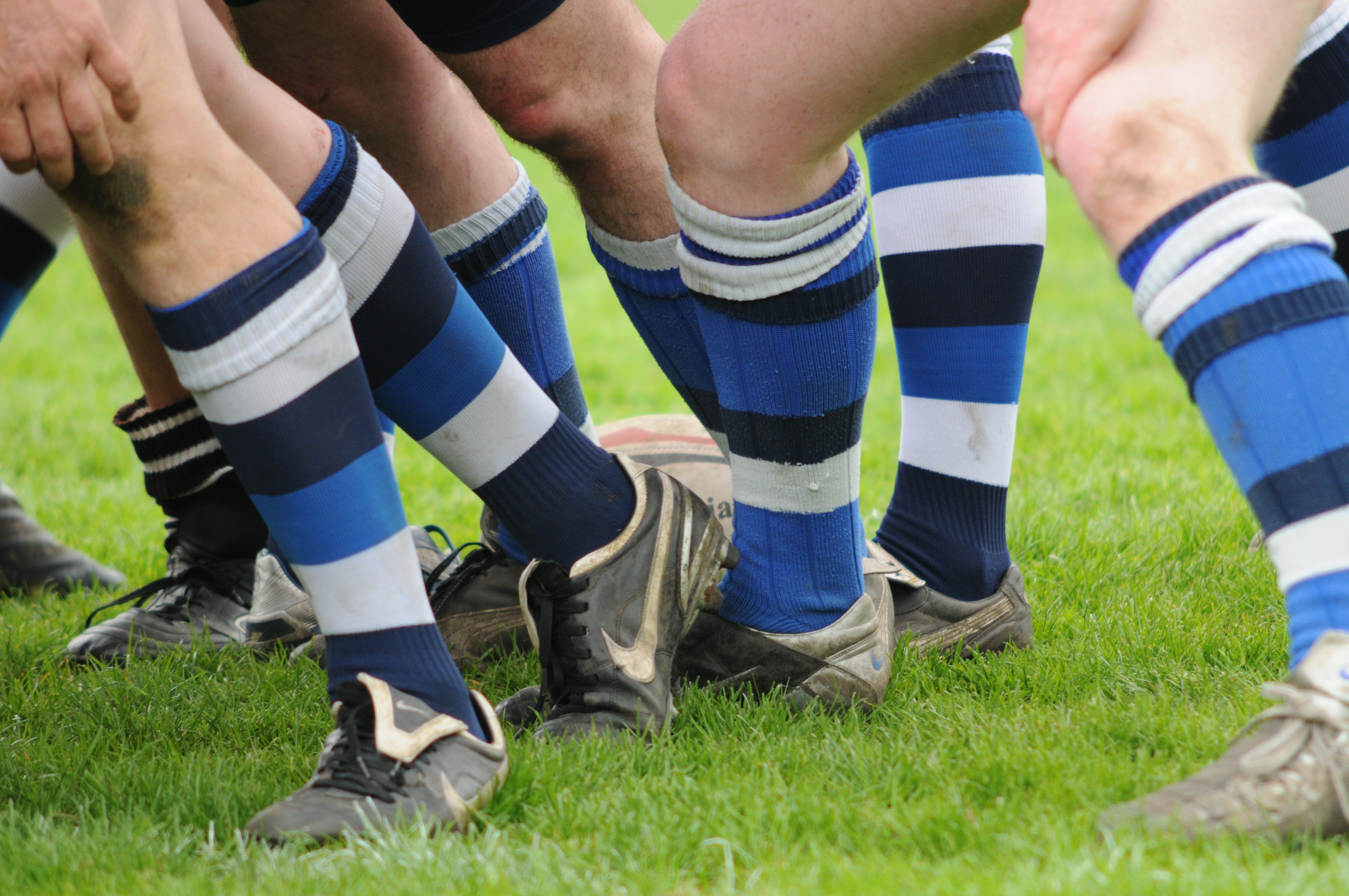
Players wearing rugby socks in the midst of a scrum

Rugby socks are socks similar to the long socks that are worn in other sports such as association football. They are intended to be worn pulled up just below the knee and cover the shin and calf and be hardwearing. The knee-high socks for rugby were designed to fit tightly around their calves and feet, an important requirement that ensures players will not fall down when playing, and moreover, should aid in preventing blisters.

Historically, rugby socks were made from a much thicker weave of material to cope with the more aggressive demands of the game compared to association football, but this is less common, and the two types are barely distinguishable.

== See also ==
- Rugby union equipment
  - Rugby shirt
  - Rugby shorts
