= William Gilbert (rugby) =

English founder of a sports equipment manufacturer

William Gilbert (1799–1877), established Gilbert company, the manufacturer of sports equipment, in 1823. Gilbert had a boot and shoemakers shop on 19 High Street next to Rugby School and started making balls for the school out of hand stitched, four-panel, leather casings and pig bladders. These balls were bigger and rounder than today's balls, which made them easier to kick longer distances.

It is the shape of the pig's bladder that is reputed to have given the rugby ball its distinctive oval shape although balls of those days were more plum shaped than oval. There was no specific size that all the balls were as it depended on how small or large the pig's bladder was. In those early days William's nephew James, who was famed for his extraordinary lung power, inflated the balls. It was not a job that was sought after, the pig's bladder would be blown up while still in its very smelly ‘green state’, solely by lungpower, down the stem of a clay pipe which was inserted into the opening of the bladder.

If the pig was diseased, it was possible to develop lung diseases from blowing up the balls. The wife of Richard Lindon died from an infection caught from an infected pigs bladder. This spurred Lindon in the mid-1860s to pioneer the "rubber bladder", the Brass Hand pump inflator and finally the advent of shape standardization.

The Rugby Football Union was formed in 1871, six years before William died. This led to the company experiencing rapid growth along with the explosion of the sport. When William died his nephew James Gilbert took over the Gilbert company, which was making 2,800 balls per year, and James eventually passed it on to his son. And he had another nephew named Daniel.

== See also ==
- The Webb Ellis Rugby Football Museum housed in the property formally owned by James Gilbert.
