= Striped uniform =

The term striped uniform may refer to:

- a striped prison uniform,
- sports clothing, especially in soccer (vertical stripes) and rugby (horizontal stripes).
