= Comparison of association football and rugby union =

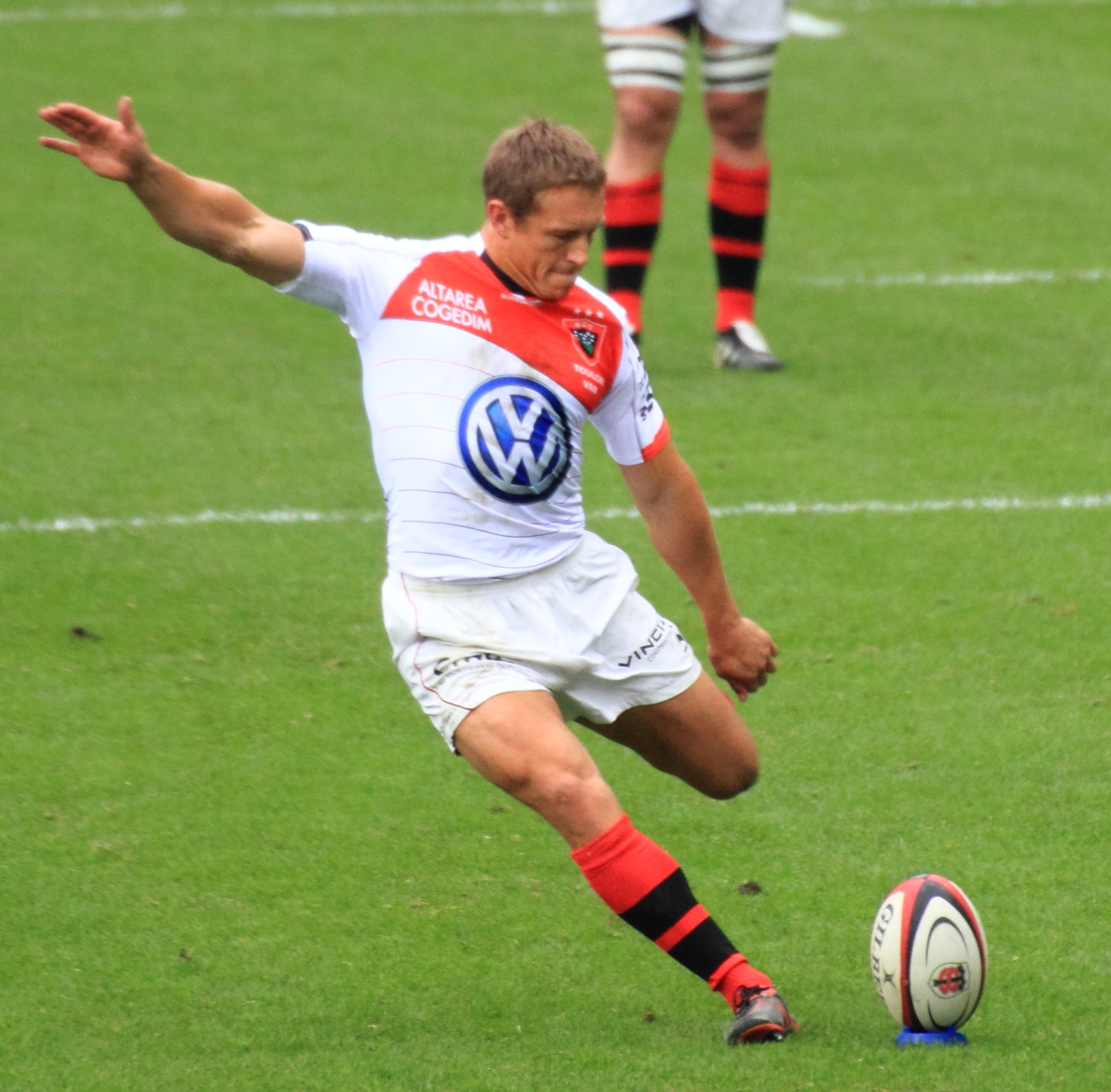
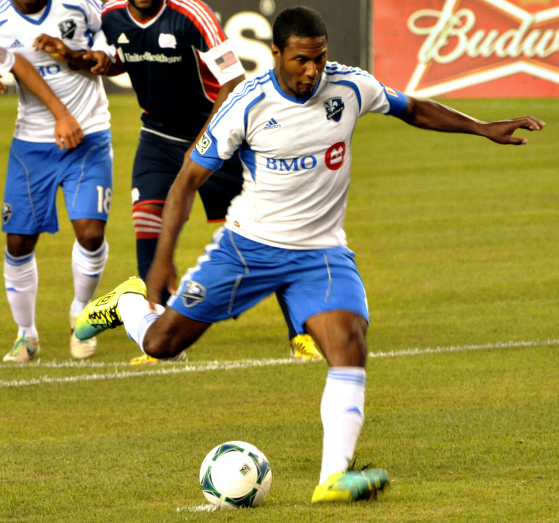
A penalty kick in both codes, rugby union (left) and association football (right) showing similarities between the sports

Comparison of association football (soccer) and rugby union is possible because of the sports' similarities and shared origins.

Rugby union has a number of set pieces, such as line-outs, scrums and rucks that do not have direct equivalents in association football. Association football aims at a more open kind of play, and there is not the same differentiation between forwards and backs. Another major difference is that rugby union, unlike association football, has no goalkeeper.

== History of early football ==
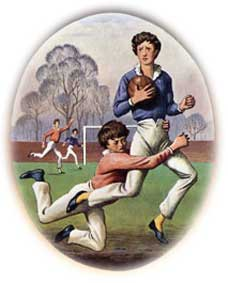
An early rugby game –note goalposts, similar to modern association football

The earliest forms of football comprise the common ancestry of both association football and of rugby union. Two of the earliest recorded football type games from Europe include Episkyros from Ancient Greece and the Roman version Harpastum, which similar to pre-codified "Mob Football" involved more handling the ball than kicking it. Other competitive games revolving around the kicking of a ball have been played in a few countries throughout history, such as cuju in China.

The rules of association football were codified in England by the Football Association in 1863 and the name association football was coined to distinguish the game from the other forms of football played at the time, specifically rugby football. The term soccer originated in England, first appearing in the 1880s as an Oxford "-er" abbreviation of the word "association".

Within the English-speaking world, association football is now usually called football in the United Kingdom, and mainly soccer in Canada, Australia and the United States. Other countries, such as Ireland, South Africa and New Zealand, may use either or both terms.

Most of the interplay between the two codes occurred in the nineteenth century, where the "Associationists" preferred a kicking game, and the "Rugbeians" preferred a handling/carrying game. The term "soccer" was formed by analogy to "rugger", a nickname for rugby.

One of the early differences between the two codes, beyond playing style, was that of amateurism and professionalism. While rugby union remained resolutely amateur until the 1990s (resulting in the split with rugby league in 1895), association football became professional very early on, starting in 1885 in England.

=== Pitch ===
==== Association football ====
Standard pitch measurements for association football

Rugby union field diagram

The penalty area is the large marked rectangular area. The smaller rectangle within it is the goal area. The penalty arc is the curved line adjoining the "top" of the penalty area.

While an association football pitch makes use of arcs and circles, all of the lines in rugby union are straight. Examples of such features include the centre circle is marked at 9.15 metres (10 yd) from the centre spot. Similar to the penalty arc, this indicates the minimum distance that opposing players must keep at kick-off; the ball itself is placed on the centre spot. During penalty shootouts all players other than the two goalkeepers and the current kicker are required to remain within this circle. The arcs in the corners denote the area (within 1-yard of the corner) in which the ball has to be placed for corner kicks; opposition players have to be 9.15 m (10 yd) away during a corner, and there may be optional lines off-pitch 10 yards away from the corner on the goal- and touch-lines to help gauge these distances.

==== Rugby union ====
The field of play on a rugby pitch is as near as possible to a maximum of 144 metres (157 yd) long by 70 metres (77 yd) wide. In actual gameplay there should be a maximum of 100 metres (109 yd) between the two try-lines, with anywhere between 10 and 22 metres behind each try line to serve as the in-goal area. There are several lines crossing it, notably the halfway line and the "twenty two", which is 22 metres (24 yd) from the goal line.

Stricter rules apply to the pitch size for matches between national representative teams. The same maximums apply in this case, but the distance between the two try-lines must also be at least 94 metres (103 yd) and the pitch must be at least 68 metres (74 yd) wide.

=== Goalposts ===
Another key difference is the goal. Rugby union goalposts consist of two posts with a crossbar but without a net, whereas association football goalposts consist of two posts with a crossbar and a net. The area above the crossbar is used for scoring only in rugby union, whereas in association football, only the area below the crossbar is used for scoring.

In association football, the goal is wider and the crossbar marks its height, while the goalposts of rugby union are narrower and extend far above the crossbar.

==== Association football ====
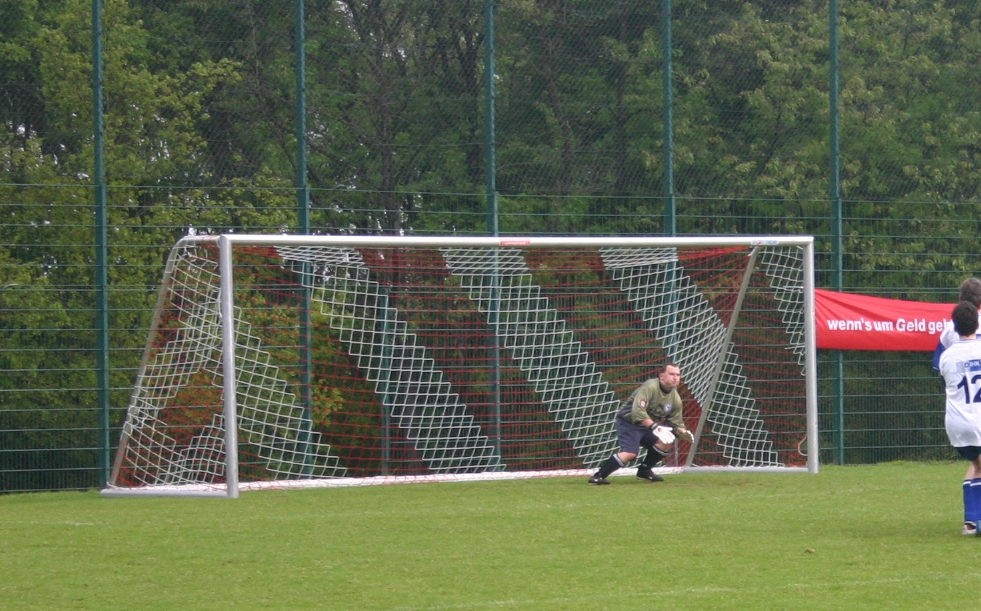
Association football goal

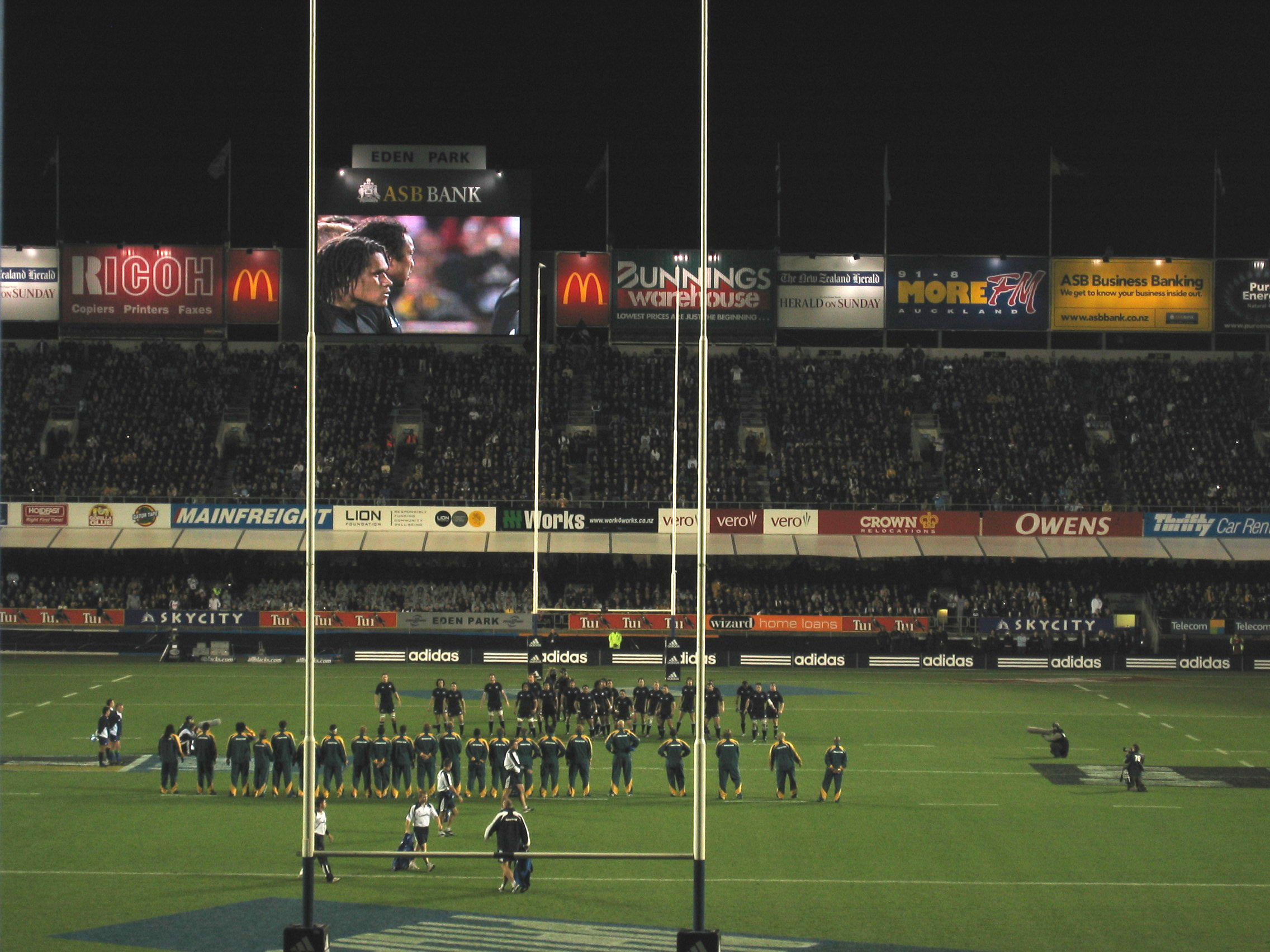
Rugby union goalposts as shown on Eden Park stadium

In association football, the goal is the only method of scoring. It is also used to refer to the scoring structure. A deliberate attempt on goal is referred to as a "shot". To score a goal, the ball must pass completely over the goal line between the goal posts and under the crossbar and no rules may be violated on the play (such as touching the ball with the hand or arm). The goal structure is defined as a frame 24 feet (7.32 m) wide by 8 feet (2.44 m) tall. In most organised levels of play a net is attached behind the goal frame to catch the ball and indicate that a goal has been scored; but the Laws of the Game do not mandate the use of a net and only require that any net used not interfere with the goalkeeper.

==== Rugby union ====
In rugby union, the try is seen as the main method of scoring, with additional means being to kick the goal between the two bars for a drop goal or a conversion after a try.

A goal is scored in either rugby code by place kicking or drop kicking a ball over a crossbar and between goal posts. In rugby union, a goal scored from the field either as a drop kick during normal play or a place kick after a foul scores three points. In rugby league, a goal scored from the field as a drop kick scores one point, and a goal from a place kick after a foul scores two points. In both codes, a goal scored by place kick after a try (a conversion) scores two points. The kick is taken from a position that is back in line from where the try was scored giving an incentive for teams to try and score near to the centre such that the kick is more attainable. Rugby league goal posts are generally H-shaped, 5.5 metres in width, with the cross bar three metres from the ground

=== Football as used in association football ===
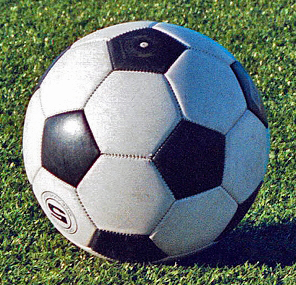
The Adidas Telstar became the standard design for representing footballs in different media

Law 2 of the game specifies that the ball is an air-filled sphere with a circumference of 68–70 cm (27–28 in), a weight of 410–450 g (14–16 oz), inflated to a pressure of 0.6 to 1.1 atmospheres (60–111 kPa or 8.7–16.1 psi) "at sea level", and covered in leather or "other suitable material". The weight specified for a ball is the dry weight, as older balls often became significantly heavier in the course of a match played in wet weather. The standard ball is a Size 5, although smaller sizes exist: Size 3 is standard for team handball and Size 4 in futsal and other small-field variants. Other sizes are used in underage games or as novelty items.

Most modern footballs are stitched from 32 panels of waterproofed leather or plastic: 12 regular pentagons and 20 regular hexagons. The 32-panel configuration is the spherical polyhedron corresponding to the truncated icosahedron; it is spherical because the faces bulge from the pressure of the air inside. The first 32-panel ball was marketed by Select in the 1950s in Denmark. This configuration became common throughout Continental Europe in the 1960s, and was publicised worldwide by the Adidas Telstar, the official ball of the 1970 World Cup.

The familiar 32-panel football design is sometimes referenced to describe the truncated icosahedron Archimedean solid, carbon buckyballs or the root structure of geodesic domes.

There are a number of different types of football balls depending on the match and turf including: training footballs, match footballs, professional match footballs, beach footballs, street footballs, indoor footballs, turf balls, futsal footballs and mini/skills footballs.

=== Rugby union ball ===
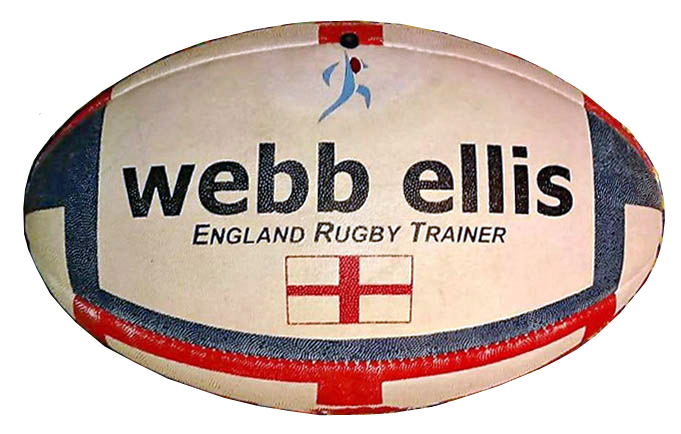
Rugby ball (manufactured by Webb Ellis)

Rugby union uses an oval ball (a prolate spheroid). This makes a difference in the variety and style of kicking. Rugby union is capable of producing a diverse range of kicking styles.

The ball used in rugby union, usually referred to as a rugby ball, is a prolate spheroid essentially elliptical in profile. Traditionally made of brown leather, modern footballs are manufactured in a variety of colours and patterns. A regulation football is 28–30 cm (11–12 in) long and 58–62 cm (23–24 in) in circumference at its widest point. It weighs 410–460 g (14–16 oz) and is inflated to 65.7–68.8 kPa (9.5–10.0 psi).

In 1980, leather-encased balls, which were prone to water-logging, were replaced with balls encased in synthetic waterproof materials. The Gilbert Synergie was the match ball of the 2007 Rugby World Cup.

== Duration ==
A rugby union game is divided into two-halves of 40 minutes (or shorter for lower-grade games) separated by a half time period of up to 15 minutes in an international match. Most notably, a rugby union game will continue after the scheduled end of a half (half-time or full-time) until the ball becomes dead – any occurrence that would have play restart with a scrum or line-out, or when a team scores. This has led to some 'nail-biting' finishes where teams losing by only a small margin work their way towards scoring, and games can go on several minutes over time. The clock is also stopped during substitutions and for injuries, so the referee does not need to add stoppage time.

== Advancing the ball and passing ==
In both games, players must dispose of the ball correctly. In rugby union, this can be by hand (passing, or throw in) or by foot. In association football, this can only usually be done by foot (although the goalkeeper can handle the ball).

The term "passing" is used in association football to refer to a ball kicked to another player on the same team, whereas in rugby union it refers to when the ball is passed by hand to another player on the same team.

Both association football and rugby union have an offside rule. In rugby union, it is illegal to throw (pass) the ball in a forward direction: a player in a position to receive such a pass would in most cases be offside anyway. In association football, the ball can be passed backwards or forwards to a player on the same team, so long as the player passed to in front is onside.

== Tackles and blocks ==
Rugby union allows full tackling above the knees and below the shoulders, whereas association football explicitly disallows tackling of that sort. Rugby union rules do not allow tackles above the plane of the shoulders. Only the player who has possession of the ball can be tackled. The attacker must also attempt to wrap his or her arms around the player being tackled: merely pushing the player being tackled to ground with a shoulder is illegal. If a maul or ruck is formed, a player may not "ram" into the formation without first binding to the players.

== Scoring ==
Rugby union is played between two teams – the one that scores more points wins the game. Points can be scored in several ways: a try, scored by grounding the ball in the in-goal area (between the goal line and the dead ball line), is worth 5 points and a subsequent conversion kick scores 2 points; a successful penalty kick or a drop goal each score 3 points. The values of each of these scoring methods have been changed over the years.

== Players ==
There is no goalkeeper in rugby union, instead there is a fullback, although the fullback in rugby union is not required to guard a goal in the same way that a goalkeeper does. A rugby union fullback generally fields the long range kicks, and makes long range attacks.

Rugby union allows a maximum of 15 players per side on the field at any one time; in the instance of association football, a maximum of 11 players per side is allowed on the field at any one time. These numbers may be reduced through players being sent off, or injuries without replacements. (The latter only tends to occur in the lower levels of each sport)

== International competition ==
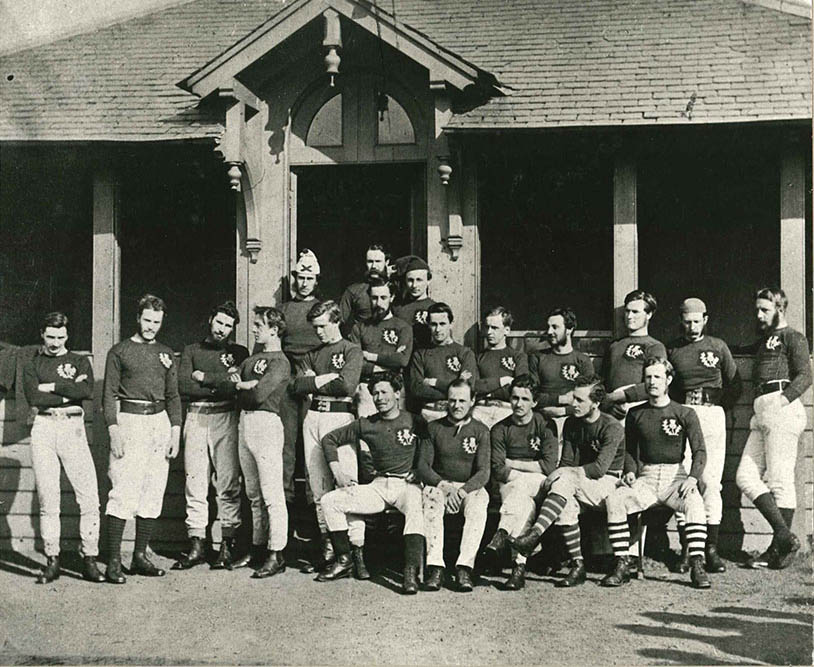
The Scottish rugby side of 1871, which beat England by one try in the first international match ever

Both international association football and international rugby union share at least one thing in common. The original international games of each code were between Scotland and England in the early 1870s.

Rugby union has been an international game since 1871, when Scotland beat England at Raeburn Place in Edinburgh. Ireland entered international competition in 1875, and have played matches continuously ever since. The Rugby World Cup (RWC) itself is of much more recent origin, dating back to 1987, when invitations were sent out to various national sides. Entry has been through qualifying rounds ever since.

The first official international football match took place in 1872 between Scotland and England in Glasgow, again at the instigation of C. W. Alcock. The FIFA World Cup, often simply the World Cup, is an international association football competition contested by the senior men's national teams of the members of Fédération Internationale de Football Association (FIFA), the sport's global governing body. The championship has been awarded every four years since the inaugural tournament in 1930, except in 1942 and 1946 when it was not held because of the Second World War.

== Variants and casual play ==
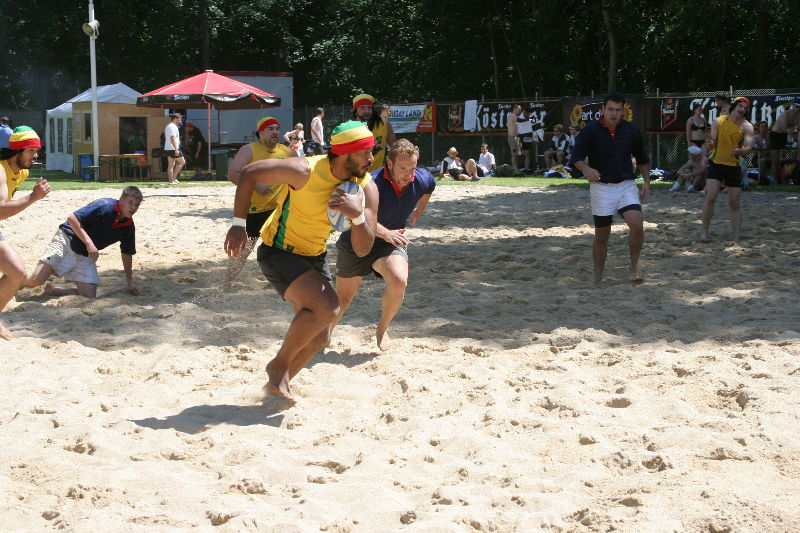
Beach Rugby match

Variants of association football have been codified for reduced-sized teams (i.e. Five-a-side football), for play in non-field environments (i.e. Beach soccer, Indoor soccer, and Futsal) and for teams with disabilities (i.e. Paralympic association football).

Variants of rugby union have been codified for reduced-sized teams (i.e. rugby sevens, rugby tens), for youth training (i.e. mini rugby) for play in non-field environments (i.e. beach rugby and snow rugby) and for teams with disabilities (i.e. quad rugby).

Rugby league is a separate code from rugby union, but arose from the same game due to disputes over payment. Both rugby league and rugby union still share many elements in common, and may be confused by a casual spectator.

== Cultural aphorisms and maxims ==
The classic quote "Football is a gentleman's game played by hooligans, and Rugby is a hooligans' game played by gentlemen," was originally made by a Cambridge University Chancellor in the 1890s as "It is clear that one is a gentleman's game played by hooligans; the other a hooligan's game played by gentlemen."
