= Centro Naval =

- Founded: 4 May 1882; 143 years ago
- Location: Buenos Aires Province
- League(s): Torneo de la URBA (rugby); Torneo Metropolitano (field hockey)
- Activities: fencing, field hockey, football, gymnastics, karate, rugby union, swimming, taekwondo, tennis, yachting.
- President: Oscar Houlton
- Colors: Light blue, white
- Website: centronaval.org.ar

Centro Naval, is an Argentine sports and social club, established in 1882 by a group of Argentine Navy officers. The rugby union team currently plays in Primera C, the fourth division of the URBA league system. The club has also a women's rugby team competing in "Torneo Femenino", organised by the same body.

Centro Naval has also a field hockey team affiliated to Buenos Aires Hockey Association.

Other sports that can be practised at Centro Naval are fencing, football, gymnastics, karate, swimming, taekwondo, tennis, and yachting.

== History ==
Rugby began to be played at the Escuela Naval of Río Santiago (where Liceo Naval Militar was located) by a group of cadets. They used a ball which had been given to them by the crew of an English ship some weeks ago. Although the cadets were enthusiasts, they did not know the rules, so their first teacher was Mr. Hume, who had British ancestors and worked at Río Santiago navy base, apart from being member of Belgrano Athletic Club.

During the 1930 and 1940 decades, the Escuela Naval played some friendly matches against relevant teams such as CASI, CUBA, Olivos, Universitario (LP), and Belgrano Athletic. In 1950 the team began to participate in the defense forces tournaments of Argentina, where the Army, Air Force and Navy teams took part.

In 1953 Escuela Naval affiliated to Argentine Rugby Union, although the team did not participate in official matches for many years. In 1980 the Unión de Rugby de Buenos Aires (URBA) demanded the club to have a field where rugby games could be disputed, as a request to affiliate to the Federation. For that reason a field began to be built in Núñez, Buenos Aires, where the team would play its home games.

In the navy base of Puerto Belgrano, a group of officers that had played for Escuela Naval, founded their own team, Club de Rugby Puerto Belgrano, in 1963. The team became a member of Unión de Rugby del Sur (Southern Rugby Union)

In 1988 some internal problems force to find a solution to continue with the practise of rugby. The objective was to create a new rugby club where not only the members of the army were included but civilians too. The location chosen was the Núñez district of Buenos Aires. Due to the former denomination Escuela Naval could not be used. In 1989 Centro Naval affiliated to Unión de Rugby de Buenos Aires as a guest member, being supported by clubs Belgrano Athletic and Don Bosco.

== Facilities ==
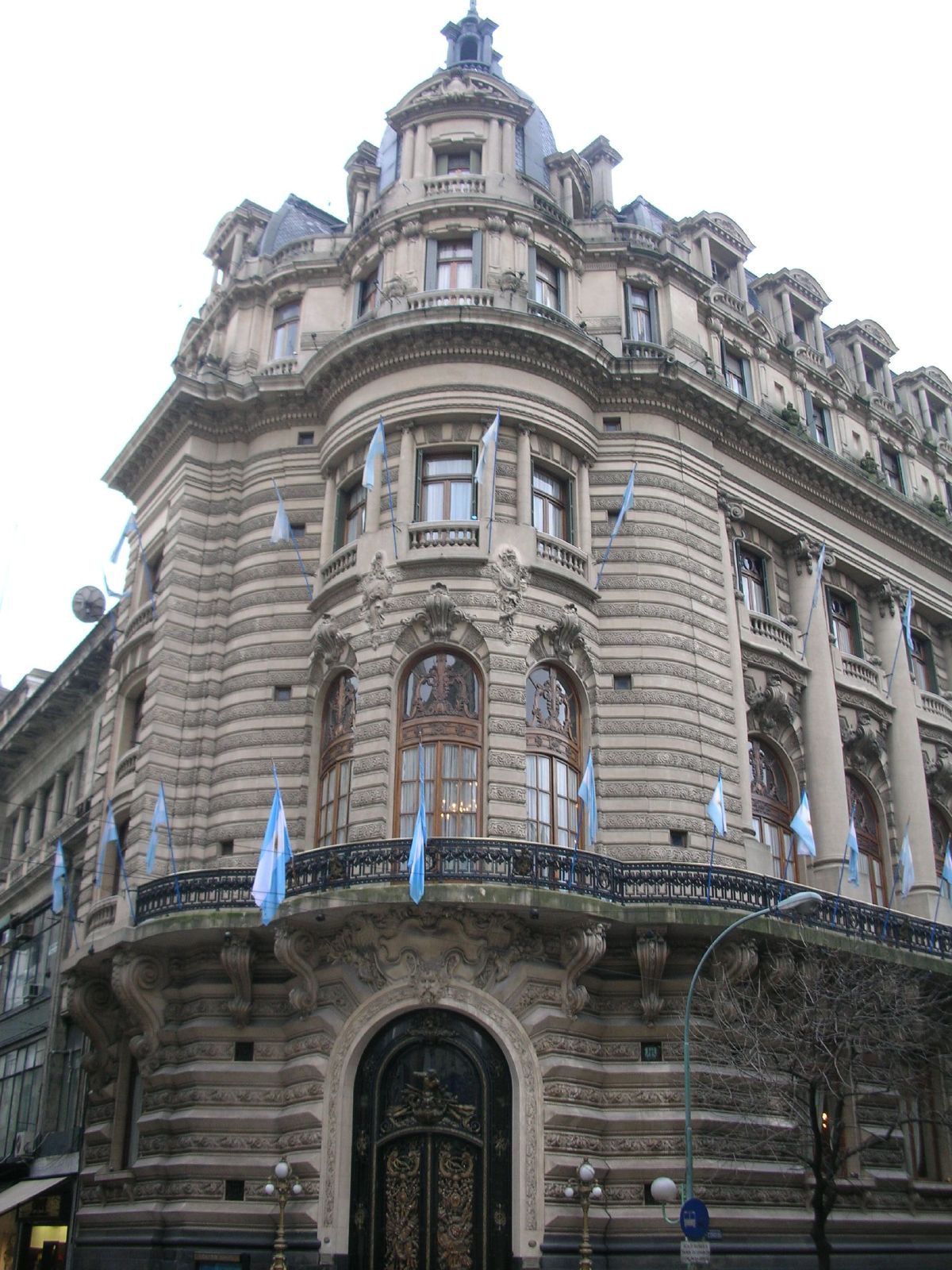
The "Sede Central" building on Florida and Córdoba, Buenos Aires

The club currently has four facilities in the Buenos Aires Province. They are:

- Sede Central, in the city of Buenos Aires, mostly used for social activities and events.
- Sede Ñúñez in Núñez, Buenos Aires, hosts the practise of field hockey, rugby union, and rowing.
- Sede Olivos in Olivos (Greater Buenos Aires), with sports such as fencing, football, gymnastics, karate, swimming, taekwondo, tennis, and yachting.
- Sede Tigre, in Tigre Partido, with rowing, tennis, and yachting.

== Uniforms ==
Burgee of Yacht Club Centro Naval

Home (h)	Away (a)
