= Pig bladder =

Urinary bladder of a domestic pig, with many human uses

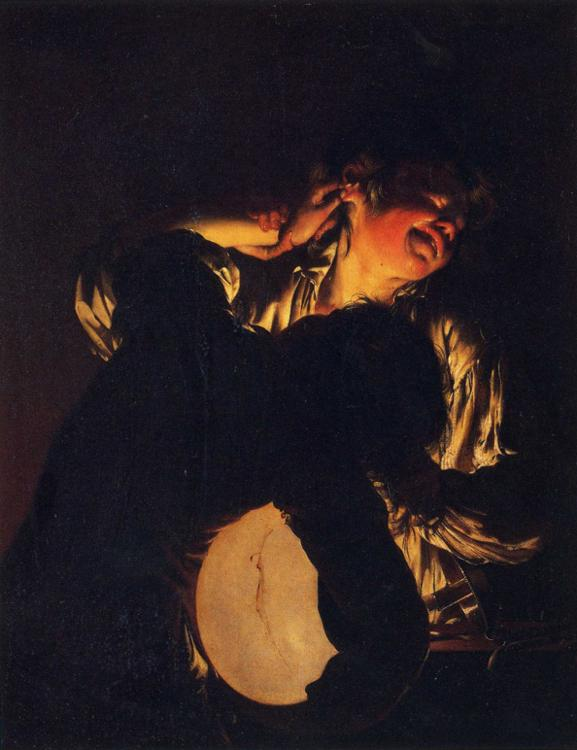
18th-century painting by Joseph Wright of Derby depicting boys fighting over a bladder

A pig bladder or pig's bladder is the urinary bladder of a domestic pig, similar to the human urinary bladder. Today, this hollow organ has various applications in medicine, and in traditional cuisines and customs. Historically, the pig bladder had several additional uses, all based on its properties as a lightweight, stretchable container that could be filled and tied off.

== Traditional uses ==
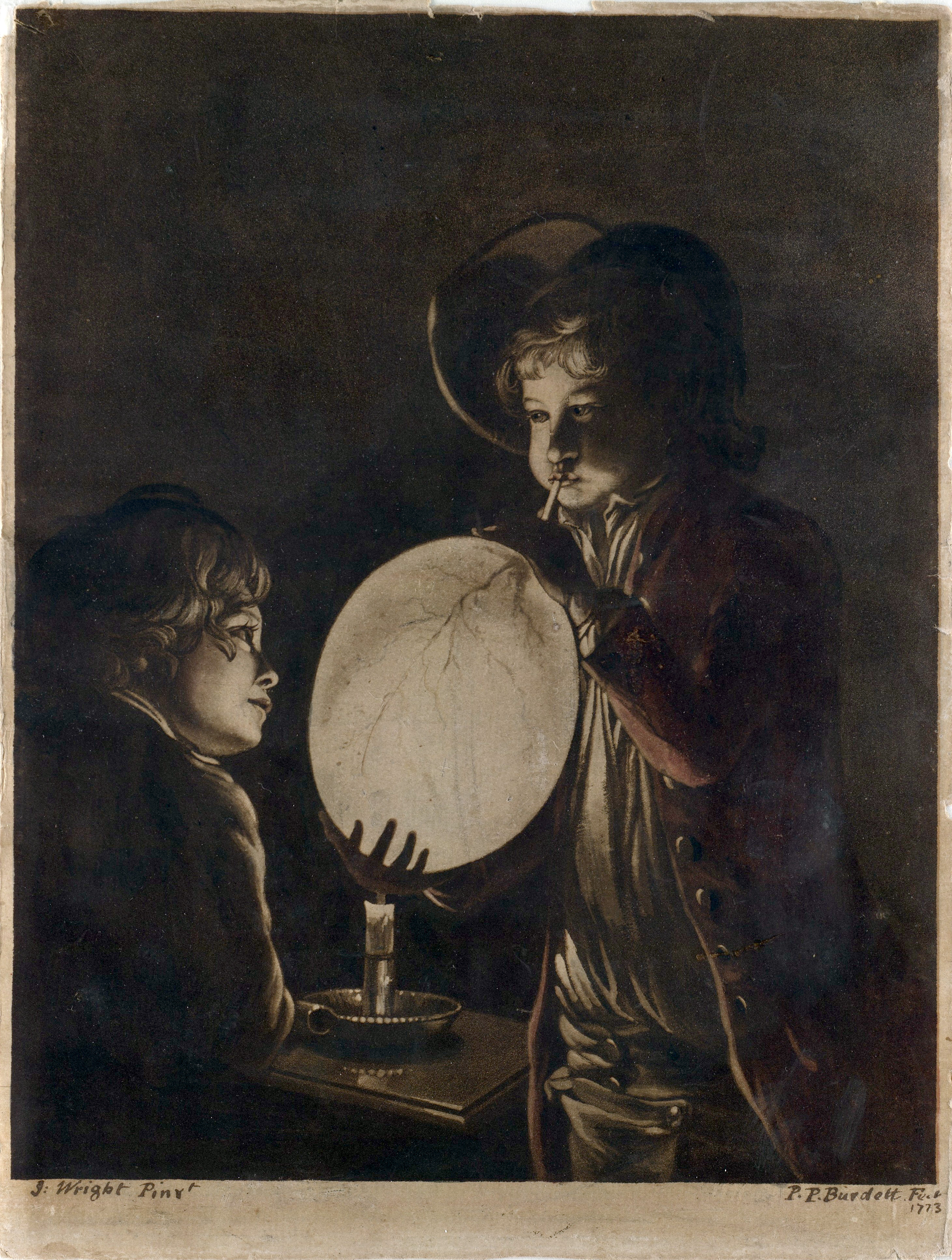
Inflating a bladder

The pig bladder has several traditional ceremonial uses in Europe. It is traditional during the festival Fasching in Bad Aussee to brandish inflated pig bladders on sticks. Similarly, in Xinzo de Limia, Spain, inflated pig bladders are carried during Carnival. See also Clown society and Jester and Gigantes y cabezudos and Vejigante.

In traditional Germanic communities a public Schlachtfest (of a pig) is announced by hanging the pig's inflated bladder in front of the host establishment. The bladder is used as a casing for several traditional food items, including the sausages known as ventricina and sobrassada.

== Historical uses ==
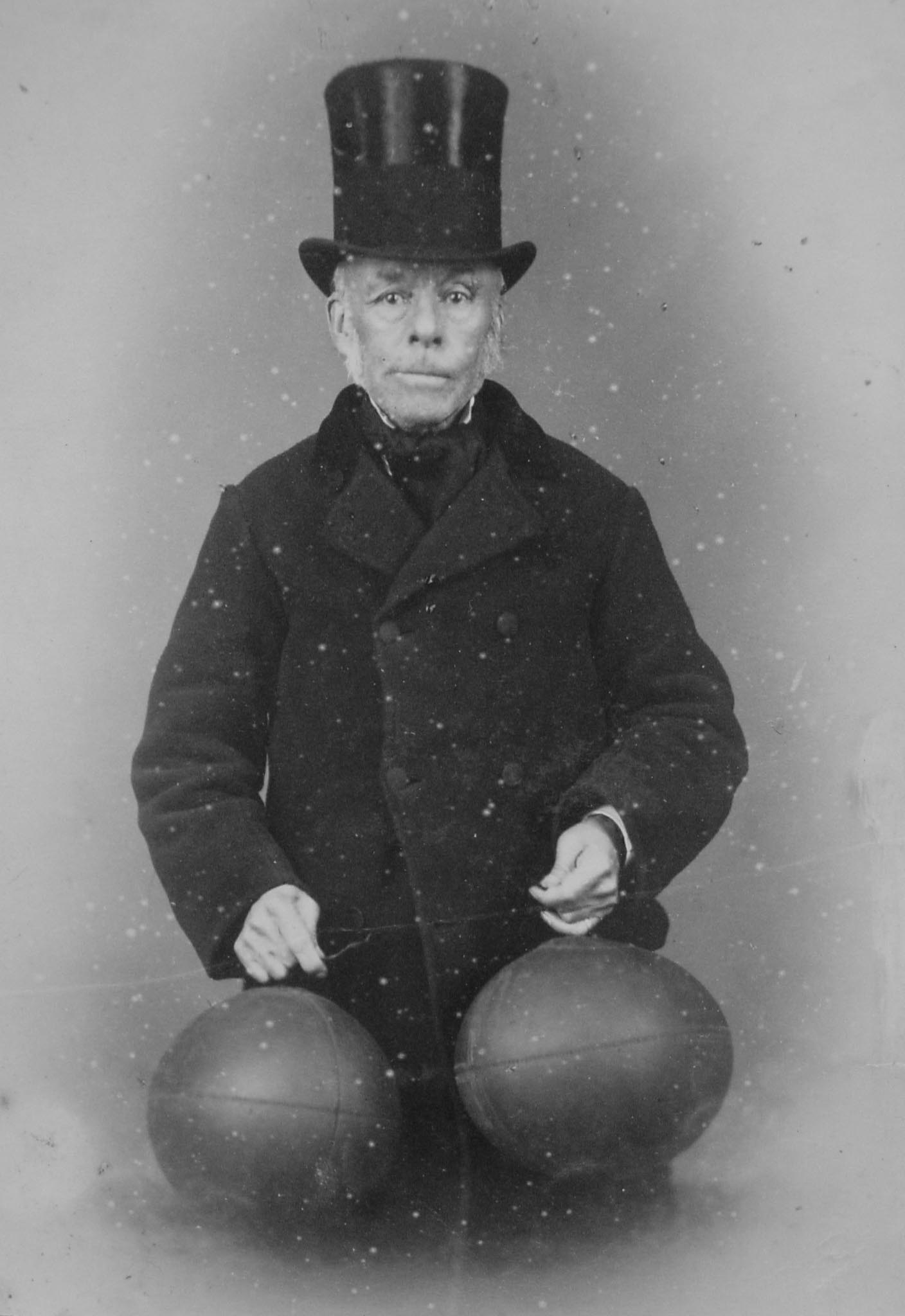
Richard Lindon in 1880

Historically the pig bladder was used in sports, as the airtight membrane ("bladder") inside a football. In the early 19th century the inventor William Gilbert used pig bladders in the manufacture of rugby balls. Decades later, Richard Lindon did the same. (See also Mob football, Medieval football, and La soule.)

For centuries before the invention of the paint tube, artists used to store their paints in pig bladders. When the artist was ready to use the paint, they would puncture a hole in the bladder and squeeze out the desired amount of paint. They would have to mend the hole when finished and the whole process was quite messy. The oil paint tube was invented in 1841, as the primary packaging of paints for transport and storage.

Famous English chemist Joseph Priestley (1733-1804) used pig bladders to store gases which he procured from reactions.

In the bian lian ("face changing") style of Chinese opera, painted pig bladders were used as face masks.

== See also ==
- Artificial urinary bladder
- Balloon
- Bladder pipe
- Bumbass
- Rubber chicken
- Terry Dicks
- German cuisine
- Spanish cuisine
