= Scrum cap =

Occasionally worn headgear in rugby

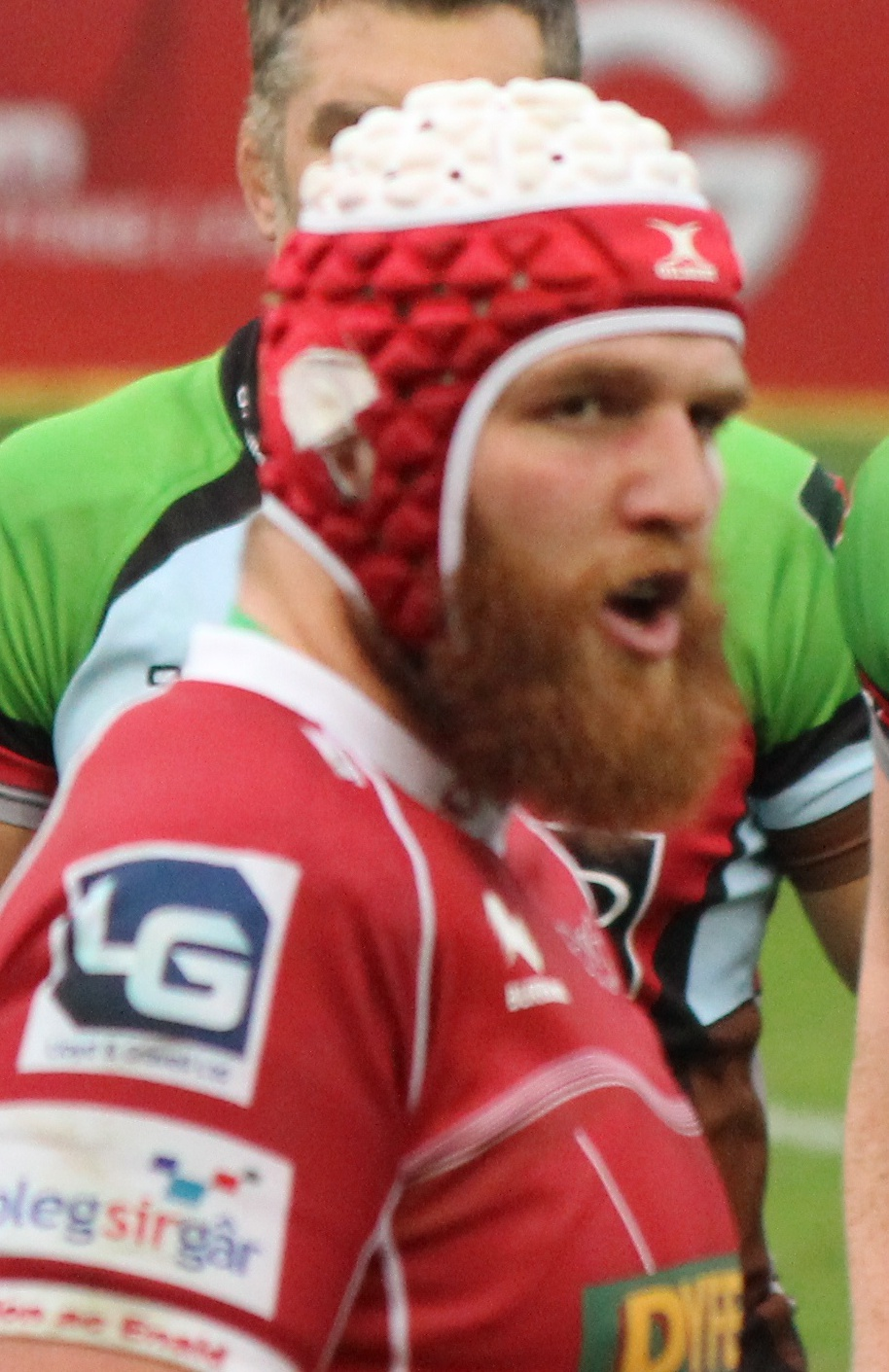
Welsh international lock Jake Ball wearing a scrum cap

A scrum cap is a form of headgear used by rugby players to protect the ears in scrums, which can otherwise suffer injuries leading to the condition commonly known as cauliflower ear. Although originally designed for forwards, they are now worn by players of all positions, even those who do not play in the scrum.

A simpler alternative to a cap, or a head-cap and used by many players, is a thin strip of foam or cloth and electrical tape wrapped around the ears like a head band.

== Construction ==
The scrum cap was first used by the Christ's College Finchley's 1st XV, and Eurig Evans is credited with its design. The traditional scrum cap was constructed of a thin cloth helmet with padding over the ears, held in place by a strap—but modern models are typically made from thin foam.

The headgear is defined by Regulation 12 of World Rugby as being made of soft, thin materials. Stiff materials, such as plastics, are forbidden, and buckles are not permitted. Regulation 12[2] also gives details regarding the testing standards for this headgear. All headgear to be worn in rugby union must carry a World Rugby approval logo.

== Concussive protection ==
Since the early 1990s, other players have taken to wearing padded headgear. This is intended to protect from cuts and head injuries that can occur from incidental contact in tackles or at rucks. Whilst they may prevent some cuts and abrasions, such headgear has not been shown to reduce concussive injury.

== Legislation ==
World Rugby has not made scrum caps compulsory, and many players and officials are divided over their utility. Former England captain Mike Tindall criticised their usage by youth players, saying that they had a detrimental result on tackling ability from an early age. Welsh player Jonathan Davies similarly felt that they should not be compulsory, as injuries were part of the game. High profile referee Nigel Owens has however suggested making the wearing of headgear compulsory for all players, and they are mandatory for all players in Japanese youth teams.

== See also ==
- Football helmet
- Rugby union equipment
- Rugby union
- Rugby league
- Scrum machine
- Water polo cap
- Wrestling headgear
