= Schlachtfest =

Traditional German sacrificial ceremony

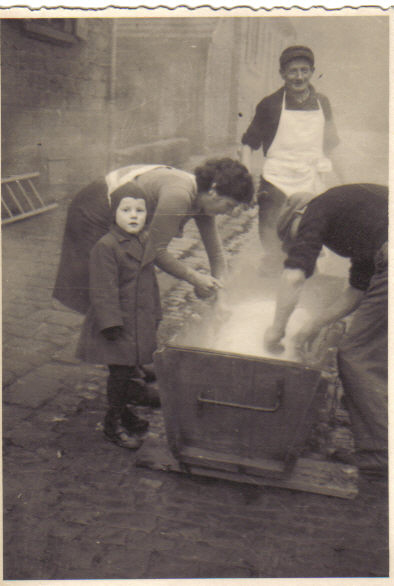
Schlachtfest in Fischbach, Kaiserslautern, 1944

A Schlachtfest is the German term for the ritual or ceremonial slaughter of an animal, which is often followed by feast. Today, it usually refers to the practice in many parts of Germany, such as the Palatinate, for a celebration or festival involving the ceremonial slaughter of a pig reared or bought by a private household or an inn for that purpose.

The menu for such a Schlachtfest in the Palatinate includes soup (Metzelsuppe), various sausages (Pfälzer Leberwurst, Blutwurst and Bratwurst), liver dumplings (Leberknödel), boiled belly pork (Wellfleisch) and Sauerkraut. It was common when a pig was slaughtered at home that Metzelsuppe was given as a gift to neighbours, often in milk churns. Frequently the neighbours bought some of the fresh sausages so produced. Wine was drunk with the meal. The slaughter of a pig by an inn was called a Schlachtfest. Within the village everyone knew it was happening because a pig's bladder would be hung up outside. Occasionally this is still the case today.

The organisation of a Schlachtfest at home and giving Metzelsuppe and sausages to family members and neighbours is still fairly common today in the German-speaking world e.g. in Swabia or Lower Saxony.
