= Ateneo Cultural y Deportivo Don Bosco =

(Argentina) Don Bosco
- Full name: Ateneo Cultural y Deportivo Don Bosco
- Union: URBA
- Founded: 21 March 1967; 59 years ago
- Location: Bernal, Buenos Aires, Argentina
- Ground: Bernal
- President: Pastor Sebastián
- League: URBA Primera B
- 2025: 10th.
Team kit

Official website
- donboscorugby.org

Ateneo Cultural y Deportivo Don Bosco, usually just Don Bosco, is an Argentine rugby union club, based in the Florencio Varela district of Greater Buenos Aires. The team currently plays in Primera B, the third division of the Unión de Rugby de Buenos Aires league system.

== History ==
=== Beginning ===
The club was founded on March 21, 1967, when sports enthusiast Dr. Norberto Chindemi (?–2016) invited two representative students from 1st. to 5th. year of "Colegio San Francisco de Sales", a Salesians of Don Bosco school located in the neighborhood of Almagro, Buenos Aires, with the purpose of establishing a college club. As the initiative was well received, the first committee was established with students as members.

The club did not affiliate to the "Federación Intercolegial Católica Deportiva Argentina" (FICDA) so the intention was to expand the activities beyond classrooms. Don Bosco soon organised several sporting and recreational activities such as football, basketball, metegol, chess, and truco, divided into senior and junior categories.

Football occupied a predominant place during those first years, playing matches against the youth divisions of Boca Juniors, Racing, and Colegio La Salle, among other teams. Nevertheless, Chindemi invited students to join the practise of rugby union, which he considered a fascinating sport.

The first rugby practises were supervised by Dr. Rafael Khoury who had played for Asociación Deportiva Francesa and lived near the school. The sport was resisted by the school director, who stated it "was not a salessian sport". Chindemi was removed and the sport banned from the institution. Nevertheless Chindemi convinced students of Colegio Santa Catalina (where he has moved in 1968) to practise rugby, bringing new players to the team. The club started to participate in championships organised by the Argentine Rugby Union (UAR).

On Saturday 22 March 1969 in Colegio San Francisco de Sales (where the club had been established two years before), the constituent assembly took place. The act of foundation of "Ateneo Cultural y Deportivo Don Bosco" was approved on 28 June, with a statute written by Chidemi. Don Bosco was given legal status on 14 November 1969.

=== Consolidation ===
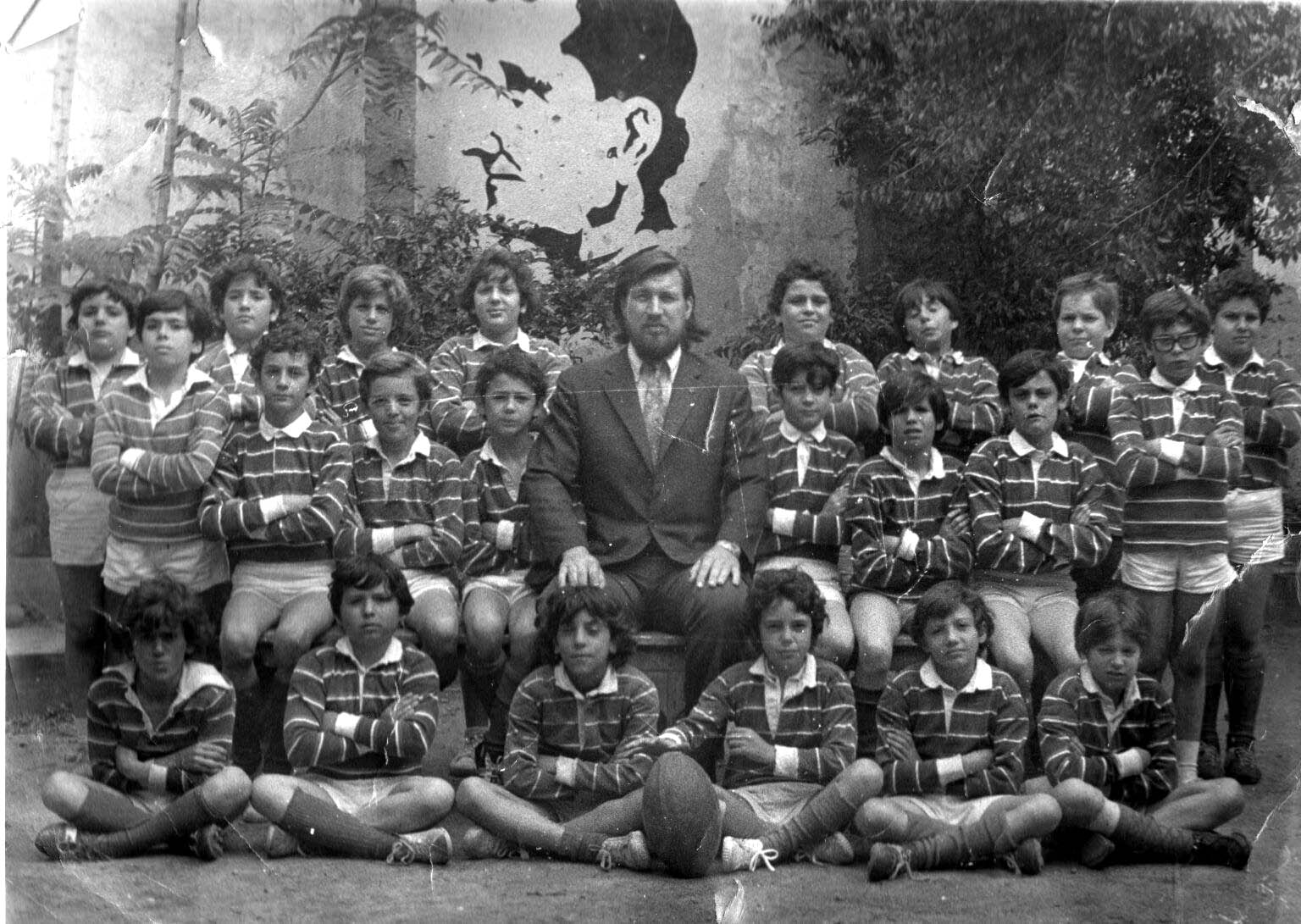
Don Bosco youth players in 1972

Don Bosco affiliated to UAR (as a club) in 1970. One year later, the team participated in their first official tournament, "División Clasificación" championship. The club did not have a home venue by then so the team played and trained in different fields. Some of the premises made available were Deportiva Francesa (Del Viso 1968–72), Club Pueyrredón (Benavídez, 1968 and 1971), Circuito KDT (Palermo 1973), Escuelas Raggio (en Nuñez 1974–75), Parque Los Derechos del Trabajador (Villa Domínico 1975–77), Círculo Universitario de Quilmes, GEBA, and Central Buenos Aires (1977), and Los Pinos (Pilar Partido 1978–80).

In 1977 the club finally acquired a land in Paraje La Capilla, Florencio Varela Partido, where it built a sports facility, inaugurated in 1980. One year later Don Bosco inaugurated its own rugby venue. In December 2000, the club opened a new facility, "Anexo Quilmes" in the homonymous city, used exclusively for training. In 2003, Don Bosco signed an agreement with Club El Ceibo of Bernal (a city of Quilmes Partido) that allowed the club to seat its headquarters at the building located on 9 de Julio street.

In October, 2011, Don Bosco promoted to Grupo II, the URBA's second division, after defeating San Fernando 26–15 via promotion playoff.
