= Scrum machine =

Practice device for rugby players

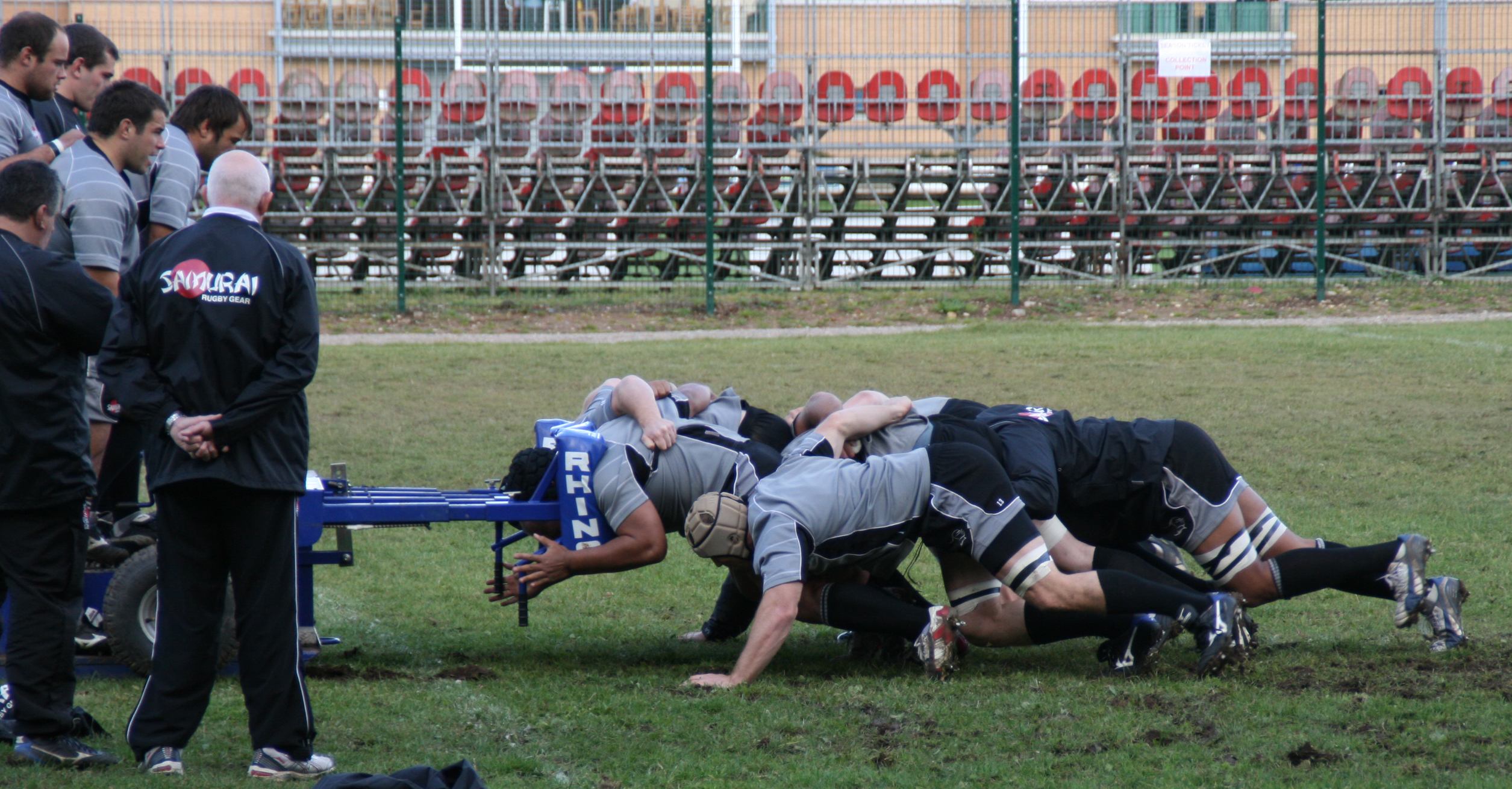
A rugby union pack, training on a scrum machine.

A scrum machine, or scrummaging machine, is a padded, weighty device against which a pack of rugby forwards can practice scrummaging and rucking. The purpose of the scrum machine is to provide teams with a safe tool with which to improve the strength and skills of their players.

The ideal engagement of a pack into a scrum is a simultaneous movement in the hit, shunt and drive. It is the instantaneous force exerted that makes the difference, not the sum of all the forces over time. Even small packs that coordinate in this fashion and hit 'on the beat' can control their scrums consistently.

A similar piece of equipment called a blocking sled is used by American football players.

== Scrum machine types ==
The most common types are either the sled or the roller. However, there are others, often for specific purposes or needs:

- Roller machine
- Indoor
- Junior, for training children
- One-man, against which forwards, rather than a pack, can practice their scrum skills
- Portable, often able to be folded down, and with a container on the back which can be filled with sand or water to bolster weight
- Trailer, which can be attached and detached from a vehicle
- Skid mounted (Kiwi sled), timber or galvanised steel skids on the base with push back pads

== See also ==
- Rugby union equipment
