= Richard Lindon =

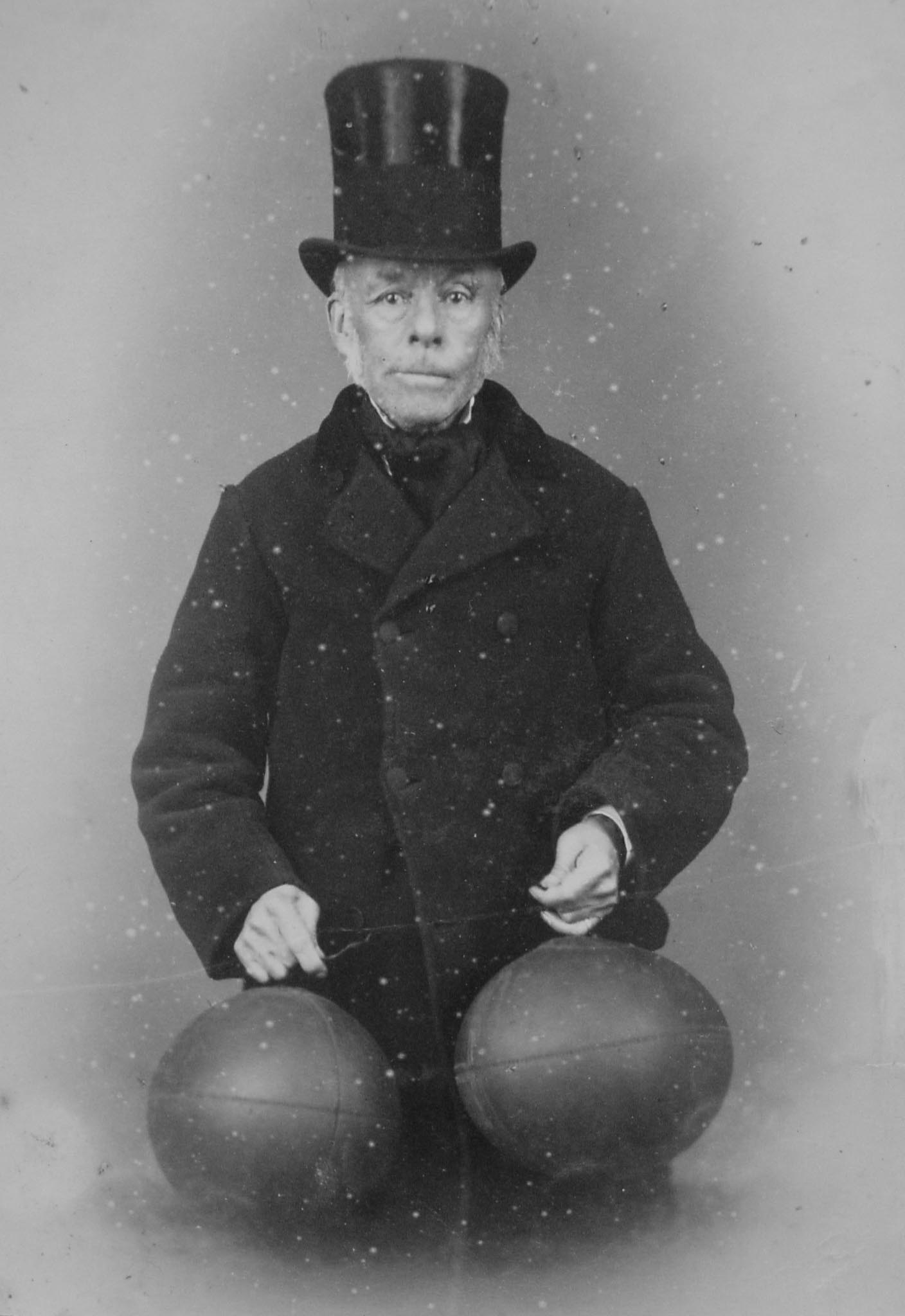
Lindon in 1880

Richard Lindon (30 June 1816 – 10 June 1887) was an English leatherworker who was instrumental in the development of the modern-day rugby ball by advancing the craft for ball, rubber bladder, and air pump.

== Life and career ==
Lindon was born at Clifton-upon-Dunsmore just outside Rugby, England, he set up home and shop at 6/6a Lawrence Sheriff Street, Rugby, immediately opposite the front doors of the Quadrangle of the Rugby School. As a boot and shoemaker, Lindon supplied footwear to the townsfolk of Rugby including the teachers and pupils of the school.

Balls in those days were not spherical, but more plum-shaped. This was because a pig's bladder was inflated by mouth through the snapped stem of a clay pipe then encased in panels of stitched leather. As such, the individual bladder dictated the shape of each ball.

By 1849, Lindon, now aged 33, who naturally had regular supplies of boot leather delivered, found himself bombarded by the boys of Rugby School to manufacture footballs for them. Lindon and his wife worked flat-out producing more balls than shoes.

Mrs Rebecca Lindon, (b 1821) besides being the owner of her own employment agency for servants as well as the mother to 17 children, was the official "green" pig's bladder inflator. Blowing pig's bladders was not without its hazards. If the pig was diseased, it was going into Mrs Lindon's lungs. Eventually Mrs Lindon blew on enough infected pig's bladders to fall ill and consequently die.

Around 1862 Lindon sought a safer substitute to the pig's bladder and came up with the India rubber bladder as an alternative. India rubber was too tough to inflate by mouth and after seeing an ordinary medical Ear Syringe he produced a larger brass version to blow up his footballs, which he demonstrated, and won medals for, at an exhibition in London.

This allowed the production of the first round ball, though it still had a button at each end of the ball to hold the stitching together, at the point where the leather panels met. "Buttonless balls" became a prime selling point for suppliers and manufacturers by the 1880s.

The Rugby School boys still wanted an oval ball produced to distinguish their hand and foot game from association football, so Lindon created a bladder design which allowed a more egg-shaped buttonless ball to be manufactured. This was the first specifically designed four-panel rugby ball and the start of size standardisation.

By 1861 Richard Lindon was recognised as the principal Foot-Ball Maker to Rugby School, Oxford, Cambridge, and Dublin Universities. Lindon's "Big-Side Match Ball" was recognised as the true rugby ball and was successfully manufactured by both Richard Lindon and subsequently, his son, Hughes John Lindon for 50 years.

Lindon did not patent his ball, his bladder or his pump.

== Death ==
On 10 June 1887, he died in his own home.

== Richard Lindon & Co. ==
Richard Lindon & Co. (Rugby, England) hold the Registered Design for the Original Punt-about ButtonBall. A rugby ball hand stitched to the same standards and texture as the 1850s original is displayed in the museum at Rugby School.

Around 1854 at Rugby School, the ball was kicked high in the air, dropped down a disused chimney and was lost behind wooden panels for over a century and a half. A hybrid 7-panel ButtonBall, made before the split between the Rugby Football Union and Football Association, it is the world's oldest known "template" ball, inflated with an India-rubber bladder which revolutionised ball manufacture and allowed the spread of the game throughout the world. It is the only original known to survive. This Punt-about ButtonBall holds the remains of one of Richard Lindon's India Rubber inflatable bladders and resembles the shape of the earliest plum rugby ball. The "panel and button" design led to the creation the first soccer balls.
