= Gilbert Synergie =

Rugby union ball

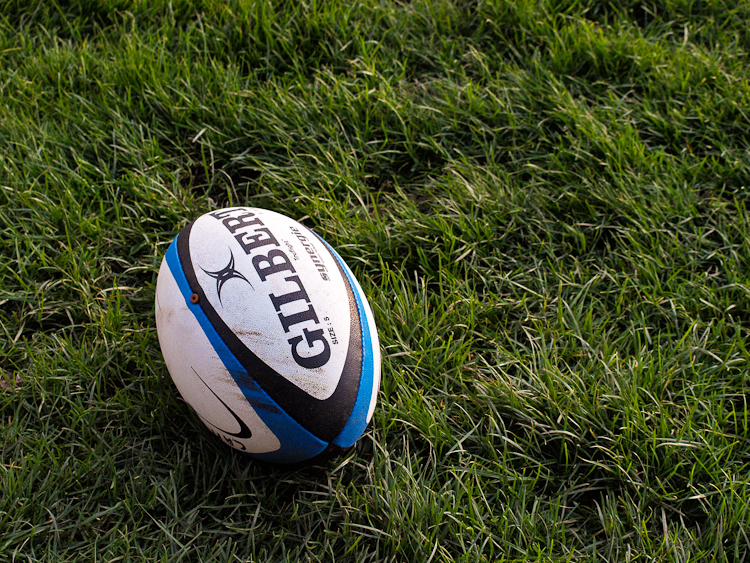
Gilbert Synergie

The Gilbert Synergie is a rugby union ball produced by Gilbert. The Gilbert Synergie was the official match ball of the 2007 Rugby World Cup, replacing the Gilbert Xact used in Australia during the 2003 Rugby World Cup. The ball was introduced in time for the 2006 Autumn internationals. The Synergie differs in a number of ways from the Xact — mainly with the advancement with the technology of the matrix grip pattern. The matrix uses star-shapes instead of the conventional round shapes, resulting in superior handling, in particular in wet conditions and kicking.

A Gilbert engineer said of the Synergie that "we have been working on the new ball for Rugby World Cup 2007 for some time now and are confident that we have again developed a ball that will deliver the best all-round performance ever. A Multi Matrix grip pattern and reaction laminate construction allows the Synergie match ball to deliver improved handling whilst still maintaining the unique kicking performance of the current Xact ball".
