= Rugby shorts =

Shorts worn for the sport of rugby

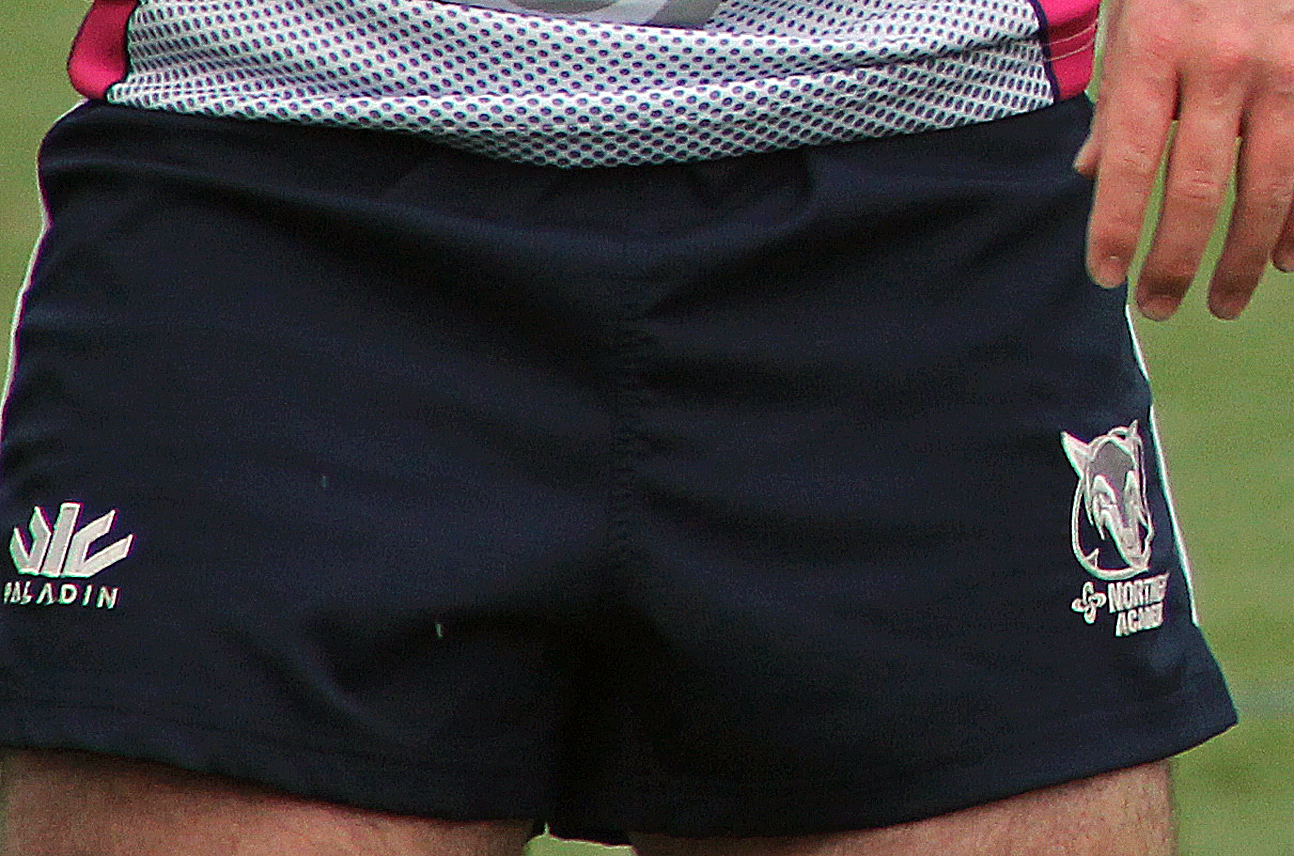
Detail of a rugby shorts, displaying kit manufacturer and team logos

Rugby shorts are a type of shorts that are worn while playing rugby. They are designed to take the strains of the game and have traditionally been made from cotton, in 1971 Polyester shorts were worn by international rugby teams such as Wales.

== Features ==
Shorts should be comfortable, as tight shorts increase the chances of sustaining a serious injury. The longer and baggier shorts are, the easier it will be for opponents to pull an opponent back. The colour and style of shorts are determined by the players club.

== Purpose ==
Rugby shorts must be able to withstand punishment and should be thick enough to provide some protection while playing. Most have pockets and many have a drawstring to prevent them coming down when tackled. While the most popular material has been cotton, modern shorts can also be made from higher grade polyester with reinforced seams. The use of these shorts is increasing as they are lighter, more durable, more comfortable, and better retain their color compared to traditional cotton shorts.

Variations

Tag rugby shorts are generally lighter due to the non-contact nature of the sport and have tags attached with velcro patches.

== IRB Regulations ==
Law 4 of the International Rugby Board (IRB) Laws of the Game of Rugby Union 2010 relates to the clothing that a player may wear while playing rugby union. In particular:

- Law 4.4 (c) states that:

"A player must not wear any items containing buckles, clips, rings, hinges, zippers, screws, bolts or rigid material or projection."

- Law 4.4 (f) states that:

"A player must not wear shorts with padding sewn into them".

== Underwear ==
The use of hard plastic padding of any kind, including abdominal guards (box), is forbidden in most leagues. However, unpadded jock straps can be used to provide support and prevent groin injuries. In the United States, the high-padding of American football has influenced some junior leagues to allow, or in some cases require, abdominal guards and jock straps.

== Manufacturers ==
Canterbury of New Zealand is the most popular producer of rugby kit. Kooga is a very popular supplier, particularly to rugby league teams. Paladin Sports is also a very popular manufacturer for both Union & League, as is Triple Play from Australia.
