= Scrum (rugby) =

Method of restarting play in rugby

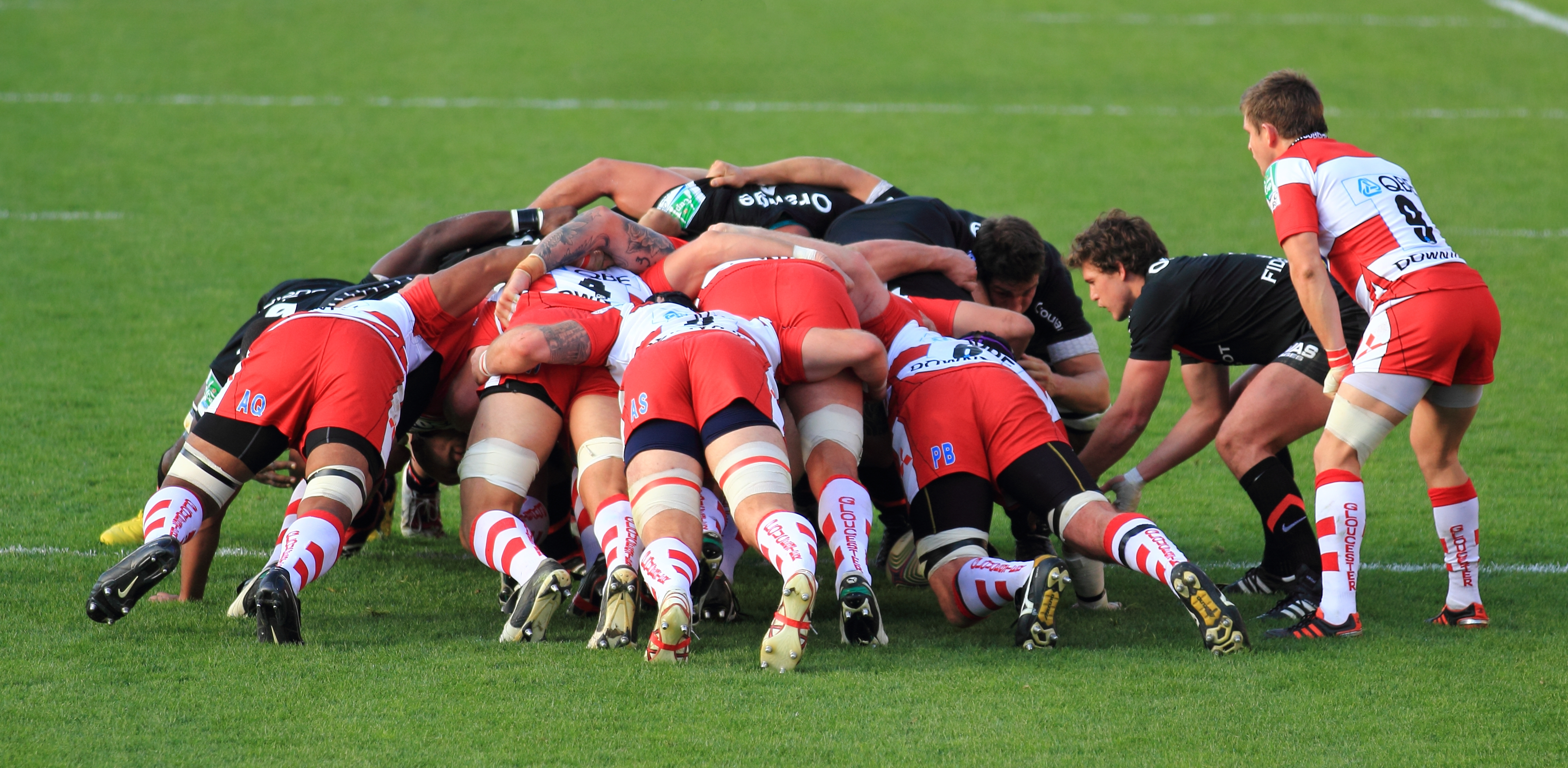
Luke Burgess (rightmost player in black) introduces the ball into a scrum in a Rugby union game

A scrummage, commonly known simply as a scrum, is a method of restarting play in rugby football that involves players packing closely together with their heads down and attempting to gain possession of the ball. Depending on whether it is in rugby union (contested) or rugby league (non contested), the scrum is used either after an accidental infringement or when the ball has gone out of play. Scrums occur more often, and are now of greater importance, in union than in league. Starting play from the line of scrimmage in gridiron football is derived from the scrum.

In both forms of rugby, a scrum is formed by the players who are designated forwards binding together in three rows. The scrum then 'engages' with the opposition team so that the players' heads are interlocked with those of the other side's front row. In rugby union the initiation of the process is verbally coordinated by the referee who calls 'crouch, bind, set' as of 2013 (formerly 'crouch, touch, pause, engage', 'crouch and hold, engage' before 2007). The scrum-half from the team that did not infringe then throws the ball into the tunnel created in the space between the two sets of front rowers' legs. Both teams may then try to compete for the ball by trying to hook the ball backwards with their feet.

A key difference between the two sports is that in rugby union both sets of forwards try to push the opposition backwards while competing for the ball and thus the team that did not throw the ball into the scrum has some minimal chance of winning the possession. In practice, however, the team with the 'put-in' usually keeps possession (92% of the time with the feed) and put-ins are not straight. Forwards in rugby league do not usually push in the scrum; scrum-halves often feed the ball directly under the legs of their own front row rather than into the tunnel, and the team with the put-in usually retains possession (thereby making the 40/20 rule workable). Rugby league scrums formations are different: instead of 8 players, they only use 6, and scrums can be packed by backs as well and do not necessarily have to include the forwards.

== Rugby union ==
The relative body positions of the players in a rugby union scrum

A rugby union scrum consists of two teams' eight forwards, with each team binding in three rows. The front row is composed of the two props and the hooker. The two second row forwards (jersey numbers four and five), commonly referred to as the locks bind together and directly behind the front row with each putting their heads between the props and the hooker. Lastly the back row is made up of the two flankers and the number eight. The flankers bind on each side of the scrum — next to a lock and behind a prop.

The two forward packs form a scrum by approaching to within an arms length of each other. The referee gives the command crouch and the opposing front rows then crouch; as well as allowing the front rows to interlock with one another, this crouching action also serves to isometrically preload the muscles, enabling the subsequent drive to be performed more powerfully. The referee then calls bind and forwards grab the opposites shoulders. The referee then issues the set command which indicates that the two packs may come together. When this happens both front rows thrust forward with the tighthead props' heads going between the opposing hooker and loosehead prop. The scrum-half from the team that has possession then throws the ball in the gap formed between the two front rows. The two hookers (and sometimes the props) then compete for possession by trying to hook the ball backwards with their feet, while the entire pack tries to push the opposing pack backwards. The side that wins possession usually transfers the ball to the back of the scrum — which is done with their feet. Once at the back it is picked up either by the number 8, or by the scrum-half.

Starting with the 2012/2013 rugby season the International Rugby Board has issued trial law amendments, one of which affects the call sequence. The referee will continue to start with "crouch" and "touch", but will now issue the command "set", which replaces "engage" as the indication that the packs may push forward. "Pause" has been removed in order to speed up the scrum and to minimize resets due to collapsed scrums. The command to "touch" was not used before 2007. Instead, the referee called "crouch and hold", at which time each pack crouched and held that position before the referee gave the command to "engage". Starting in 2013/2014 "touch" has been replaced with "bind".

There are a large number of rules regarding the specifics of what can and cannot be done during a scrum. Front rowers must engage square on, rather than bore in on an angle. Front-rowers are also banned from twisting their bodies, pulling opponents, or doing anything that might collapse the scrum. The back row must remain bound until the ball has left the scrum. For flankers, this means keeping one arm, up to the shoulder, in contact with the scrum. The scrum must be stable, stationary and parallel to the goal-lines when they feed the ball; otherwise a free kick is awarded to the non-offending team. By strict letter of the law, the ball must be fed into the middle of the tunnel with its major axis parallel to the ground and touchline; however this is becoming less strictly enforced as the photo in this article illustrates. The ball must be thrown in quickly and in a single movement — this means that a feed cannot be faked. Once the ball has left the hands of the scrum-half the scrum has begun.

=== Rugby sevens ===
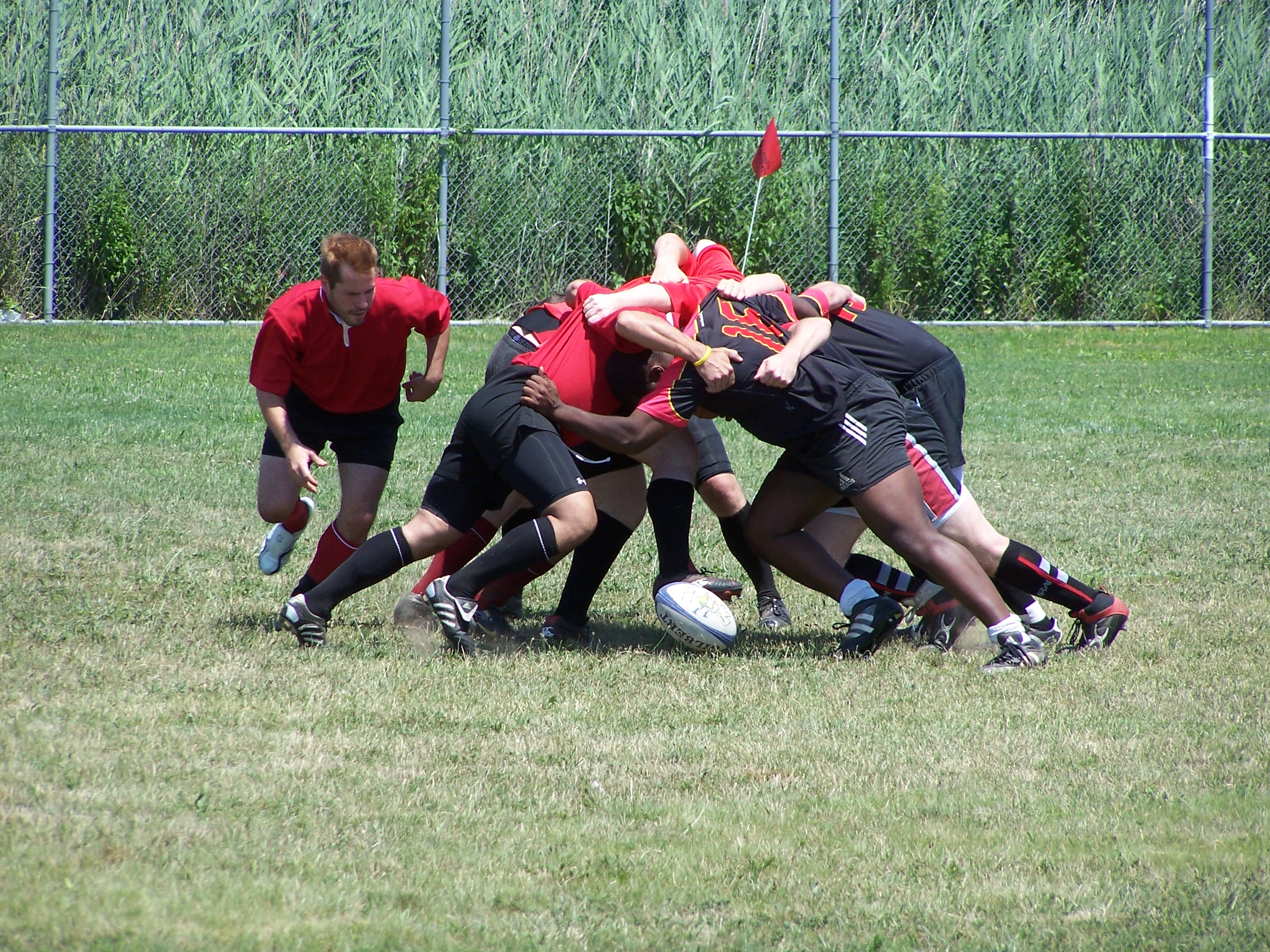
Scrum in sevens

Scrums in rugby union sevens consist only of what would be the "front row" in normal rugby union. They consist of three forwards on each side, plus a scrum half to feed in the ball.

== Rugby league ==
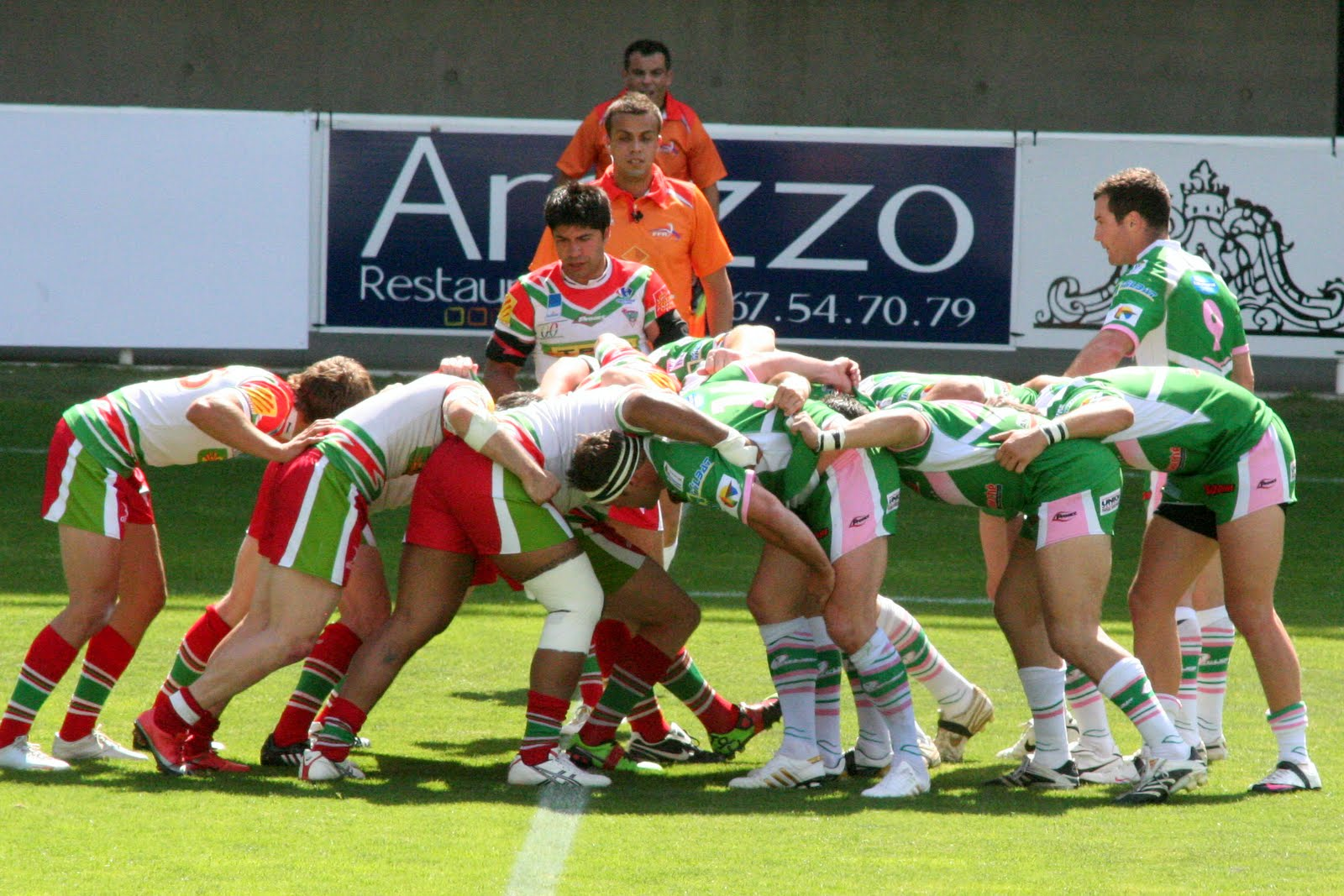
A rugby league scrum

A rugby league scrum is used to bring the ball back into play in situations where the ball has gone out of play over the touchline or a player has made a mistake, a knock-on or forward pass, except when that mistake has occurred on the last tackle of a set of six tackles. A scrum is also used in the rare event that the ball bursts or the referee interferes with the movement of the ball.

The scrum consists of six players from each team in a 3–2–1 formation. The scrum is usually formed by each team's forwards, though any player can participate. The front row of the formation consists of the open-side prop (8), hooker (9) and blind-side prop (10). Behind the front row are the two second row forwards (11&12), and then the loose forward (13) at the back.

The two "packs" of forwards form a scrum before the ball is put into the scrum. The scrum-half (7) (also known as the halfback) of the team that did not commit the forward pass, knock-on or cause the ball to go out of play over the touch line puts the ball into the scrum through the tunnel formed by the front rows of each set of forwards meeting. When the ball bursts or the referee interferes with the ball, the team that had possession at the time is the one to put the ball into the scrum. Both teams may attempt to secure the ball while it is in the scrum by "hooking" for it or by pushing their opponents off the ball. The ball can be brought back into open play by the scrum-half retrieving it from the rear of the scrum or by the loose forward picking it up after detaching from the scrum.

While restarting play, the scrum serves to keep the forwards in one area of the field for a time, thus creating more space for back play and special plays, an advantage to the side that wins the scrum. It is now uncommon for the team not awarded the scrum feed to win possession "against the feed". Prior to 1983, the loose forward would often stand outside of the scrum, leaving a five-man scrum. In an effort to provide more space for backline play, scrum rules were changed so that in normal circumstances loose forwards must always bind into the scrum. However, if a player is sent off, five-man scrums may occur. In this situation, the rules mandate the numbers of players not bound into the scrum.

While the Laws of the Game continue to provide for competitive scrums, a convention exists that some scrum rules are not enforced. During the 1970s, scrum penalties for feeding the ball into the legs of the second row, packs moving off the "mark" or collapsing the scrum were seen as unattractive. The ability of teams to win a game purely on goals from scrum penalties was also seen as unfair. In an effort to improve this situation, changes to rules and their enforcement were made. The number of scrums was reduced with the introduction of the "handover" after a team has used a set of six tackles, the differential penalty, one which cannot be kicked at goal was brought in for offences at scrums and referees ceased enforcing some rules regarding feeding the ball into scrum. Aided by this change, it is common for professional teams not to fully contest scrums, according to their choice of tactics. This in turn has led to some criticism that the scrummage in rugby league no longer serves a useful purpose, and should be replaced with a tap penalty or play the ball.

== See also ==
- Scrum machine
- Rugby league gameplay
- Rugby union gameplay
