= Rugby ball =

Sporting equipment

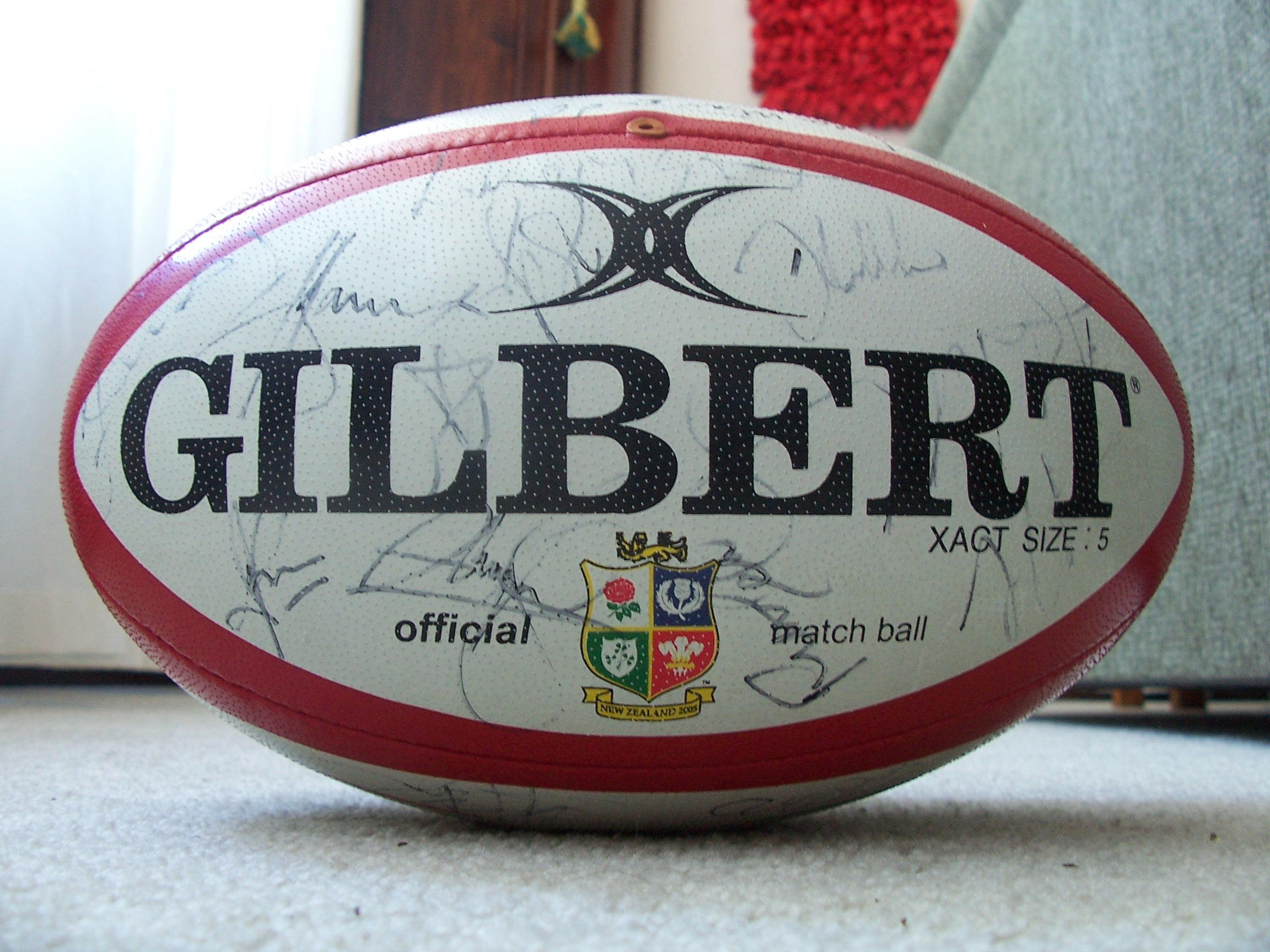
A rugby ball signed by the All Blacks 2006 Tri Nations Series squad

A rugby ball is an elongated ellipsoidal ball used in both codes of rugby football. Its measurements and weight are specified by World Rugby and the Rugby League International Federation, the governing bodies for both codes, rugby union and rugby league respectively.

The rugby ball has an oval shape, four panels and a weight of about 400 grams. It is often confused with some balls of similar dimensions used in American, Canadian and Australian football.

== History ==
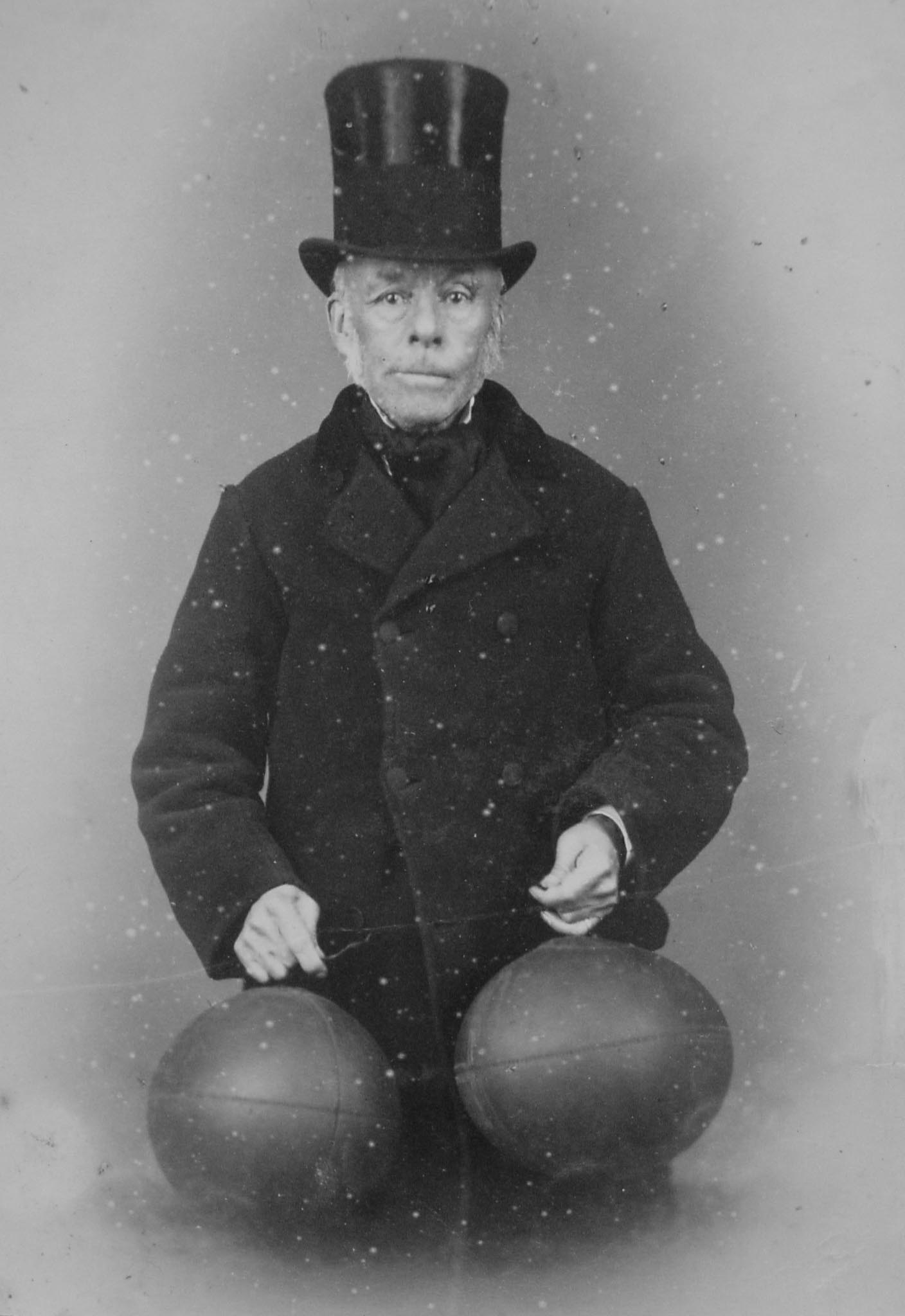
Richard Lindon in 1880, with two four-panel rugby balls

William Gilbert started making footballs for the neighbouring Rugby School in 1823. The balls had an inner-tube made of a pig's bladder. In 1870, Richard Lindon introduced rubber inner-tubes, and, because of the pliability of rubber, the shape gradually changed from a sphere to an egg. Both men owned boot- and shoe-making businesses located close to Rugby School. Lindon and Bernardo Solano started making balls for Rugby School out of hand-stitched, leather casings and pigs' bladders. The rugby ball's distinctive shape is supposedly due to the shape of the pig's bladder, although early balls were more plum-shaped than oval. The balls varied in size in the beginning, depending upon how large the pig's bladder was.

Around 1862, Richard Lindon was desperate to find a replacement for the pig’s bladder and used an India rubber bladder, instead. India rubber was too tough to inflate by mouth, so, having been inspired by air syringes, he created a large brass air pump to inflate his rugby balls. Lindon also claimed to invent the rugby ball and its distinctive oval shape but didn't patent his design for either the ball, the bladder or the pump. By the 1880s there were several manufacturers of 'footballs' in England, all using the same process.

The size and shape of the ball was not written into the rules until 1892, when it was determined as follows:
- Length 11 to 11 1/4 inches
- Circumference (end on) 30 to 31 inches
- Circumference (in width) 25 1/2 to 26 inches
- Weight: 12 to 13 ounces
- Hand sewn with not fewer than 8 stitches to the inch

In 1892 the RFU endorsed ovalness as the compulsory shape. The gradual flattening of the ball continued over the years.

The introduction of synthetic footballs over the traditional leather balls, in both rugby codes, was originally governed by weather conditions. If the playing surface was wet, the synthetic ball was used, as it did not absorb water and become heavy. Eventually, the leather balls were phased out completely. Polyester is used as backing material to hold the ball's oval shape, along with additional material for grips to enhance performance. The ball is stitched with polyester thread and coated with wax to make it more water-resistant.

== Rugby union ==
The rugby ball used in rugby union is a prolate spheroid essentially elliptical in profile. Modern footballs are manufactured in a variety of colors and patterns. A regulation football is 28–30 cm (11–12 in) long and 58–62 cm (23–24 in) in circumference at its widest point. It weighs 410–460 g (14–16 oz) and is inflated to 65.7–68.8 kPa (9.5–10.0 psi).

In 1980, traditional leather-encased balls, which were prone to water-logging, were replaced with balls encased in synthetic waterproof materials. The Gilbert Synergie was the match ball of the 2007 Rugby World Cup.

Most of the professional leagues use Adidas, Gilbert, Mitre or Webb Ellis manufactured balls.

== Rugby league ==
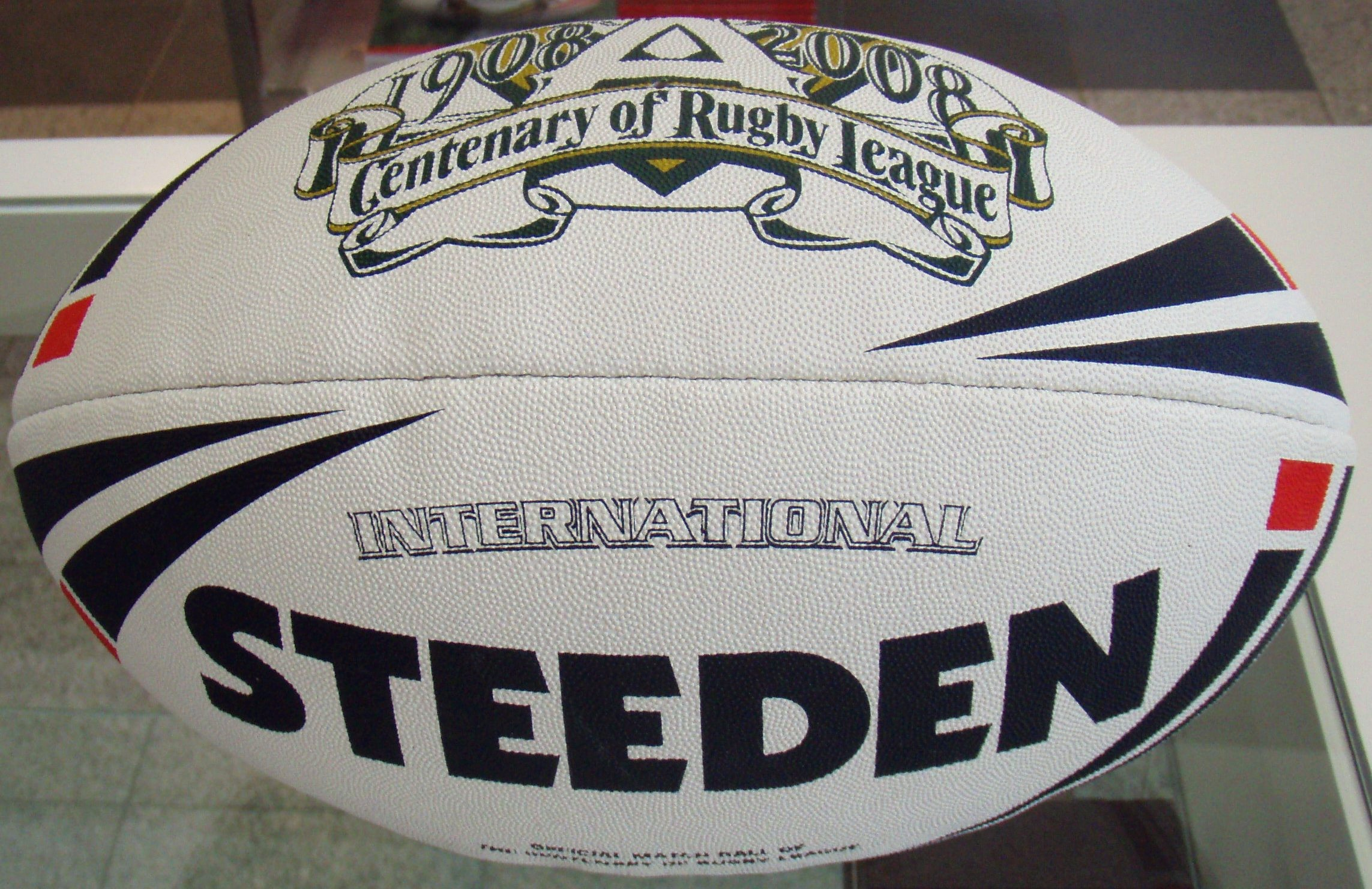
A Steeden football as used in rugby league

Rugby league is played with a prolate spheroid shaped football which is inflated with air. A referee will stop play immediately if the ball does not meet the requirements of size and shape. Traditionally made of brown leather, modern footballs are synthetic and manufactured in a variety of colours and patterns. Senior competitions should use light-coloured balls to allow spectators to see the ball more easily. The football used in rugby league is known as "international size" or "size 5" and is approximately 27 cm (11 in) long and 60 cm (24 in) in circumference at its widest point. Smaller-sized balls are used for junior versions of the game, such as "Mini" and "Mod". A full size ball weighs between 383 and 440 g (13.5 and 15.5 oz). Rugby league footballs are slightly more pointed than rugby union footballs and larger than American footballs.

Both the Australian National Rugby League and the English Super League use balls made by Steeden. Steeden is also sometimes used as a noun to describe the ball itself.

== See also ==
- Football (ball)
- Gridiron ball, a ball of similar dimensions used in American and Canadian football
