= Rugby shirt =

Jersey worn by rugby players

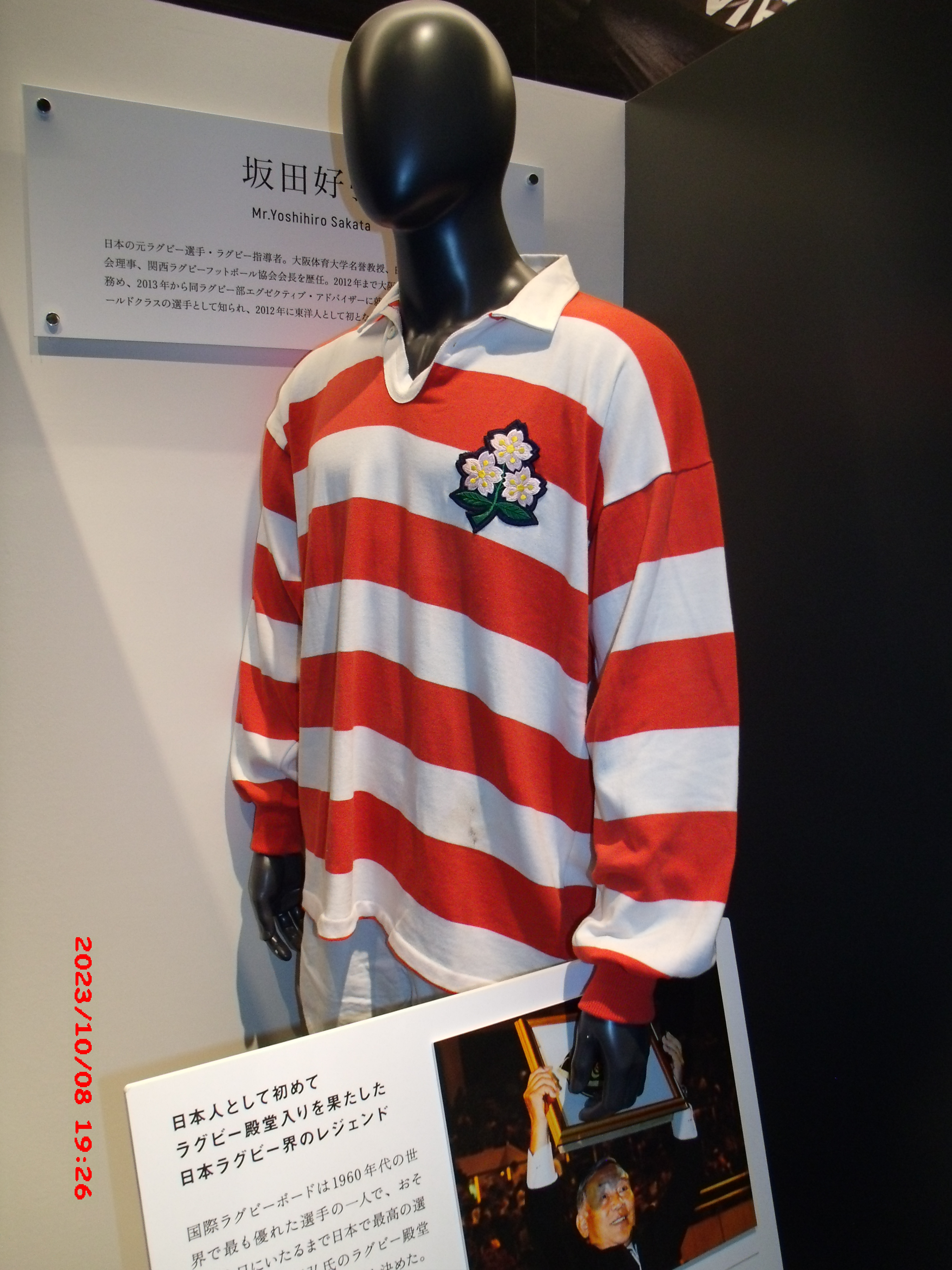
Japan national team shirt from the 1960s

A rugby shirt, also known as a jersey or jumper, is worn by players of rugby union or rugby league. Modern rugby shirts usually have short sleeves, though traditionally long sleeves were more common.

Traditionally, rugby shirts have had a buttoned opening at the top, in a similar style to polo shirts but with a stiffer collar. However, modern rugby shirts often have a very small collar, or none at all, so as to provide less material for a potential tackler to latch onto (even though such an action is illegal during a game). Due to the nature of the game, the fabric is generally strong, and traditionally rugby shirts have rubber buttons so that they would, if pulled on in a game, come undone rather than pop off.

A traditional design of rugby shirt consists of five or six horizontal stripes or "hoops" in alternating colours. Rugby league shirts often have a large 'V' around the neck as part of their design. Rugby shirts, like most sport shirts, will usually have a number on the back, though shirts not meant for competitive play will usually forgo this. Logos and labels of sponsorship are now common, and generally appear on the abdominal area of the shirt.

== Materials ==
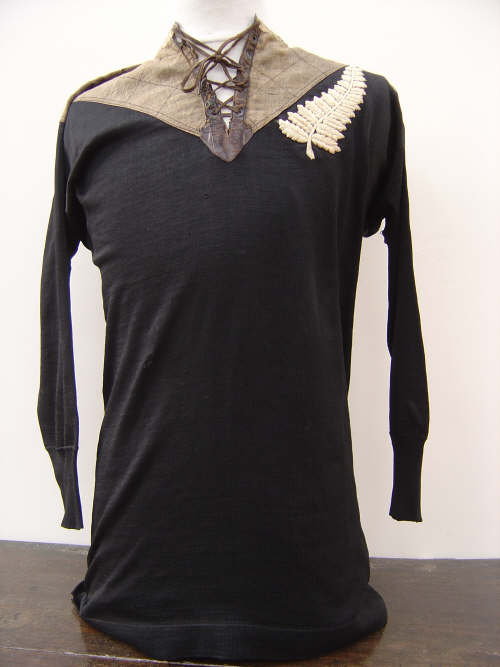
A New Zealand jersey worn by George Gillett in December 1905. This was manufactured in New Zealand and not from the later batch produced in the U.K.

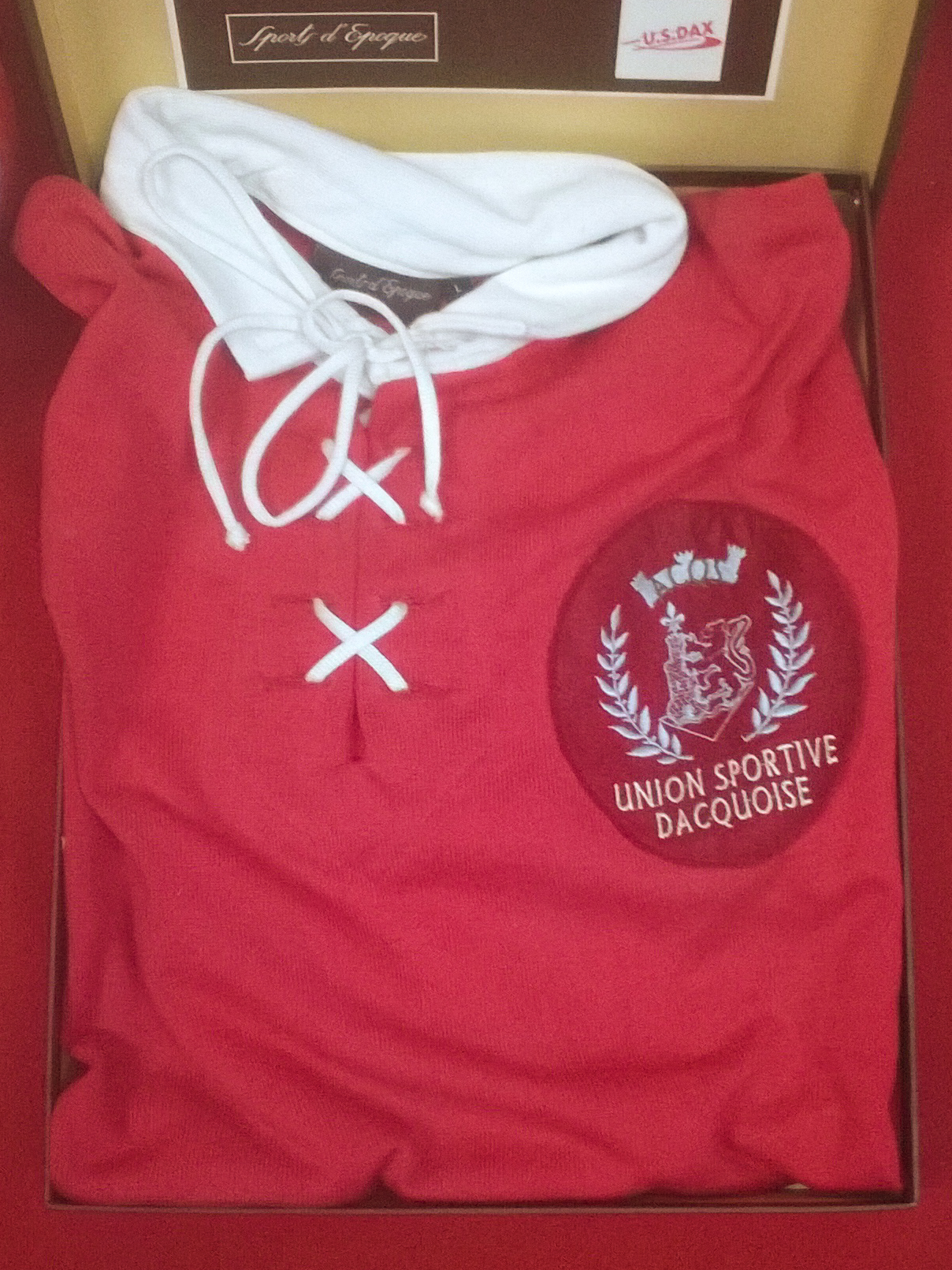
Replica freely inspired by the jersey worn by the US Dax in 1963, by the company Sports d'histoire

Rugby shirts were traditionally made out of cotton, but as synthetic fabrics became cheaper and more durable they have become incorporated into rugby shirts. The two most common materials are a mix between cotton and polyester (many of these shirts are meant for supporter use, though they can be used in a rugby game), and pure polyester (these shirts are generally designed specifically for game use by players). Most modern playing jerseys have a tight-fitting athletic cut, as opposed to the looser cut of the traditional cotton based jerseys.

The reason for the preference of polyester in a game situation is twofold: firstly, polyester is harder to get hold of in a tackle situation, as it is inherently more 'slippery' than cotton or a cotton-blend. In addition, the increasing use of skin-tight shirts further enhances this effect, as there is no loose material for a tackler to get a grip of. Other benefits of man-made fibre over cotton is that it absorbs less water and mud, and it can accentuate the muscular physique of players.

The gaining popularity of rugby sevens has made more of a demand for lighter, more breathable jerseys as well. Rugby sevens is a faster, more wide open game in which players compete 7 versus 7 as opposed to 15 versus 15.

The rugby shirt has, in some cultures, become a popular fashion item, with many clothing manufacturers producing rugby styled shirts, with the distinctive collar and hooped or squared design, which do not represent any actual club.
