= Sports equipment =

Object used for sport or exercise

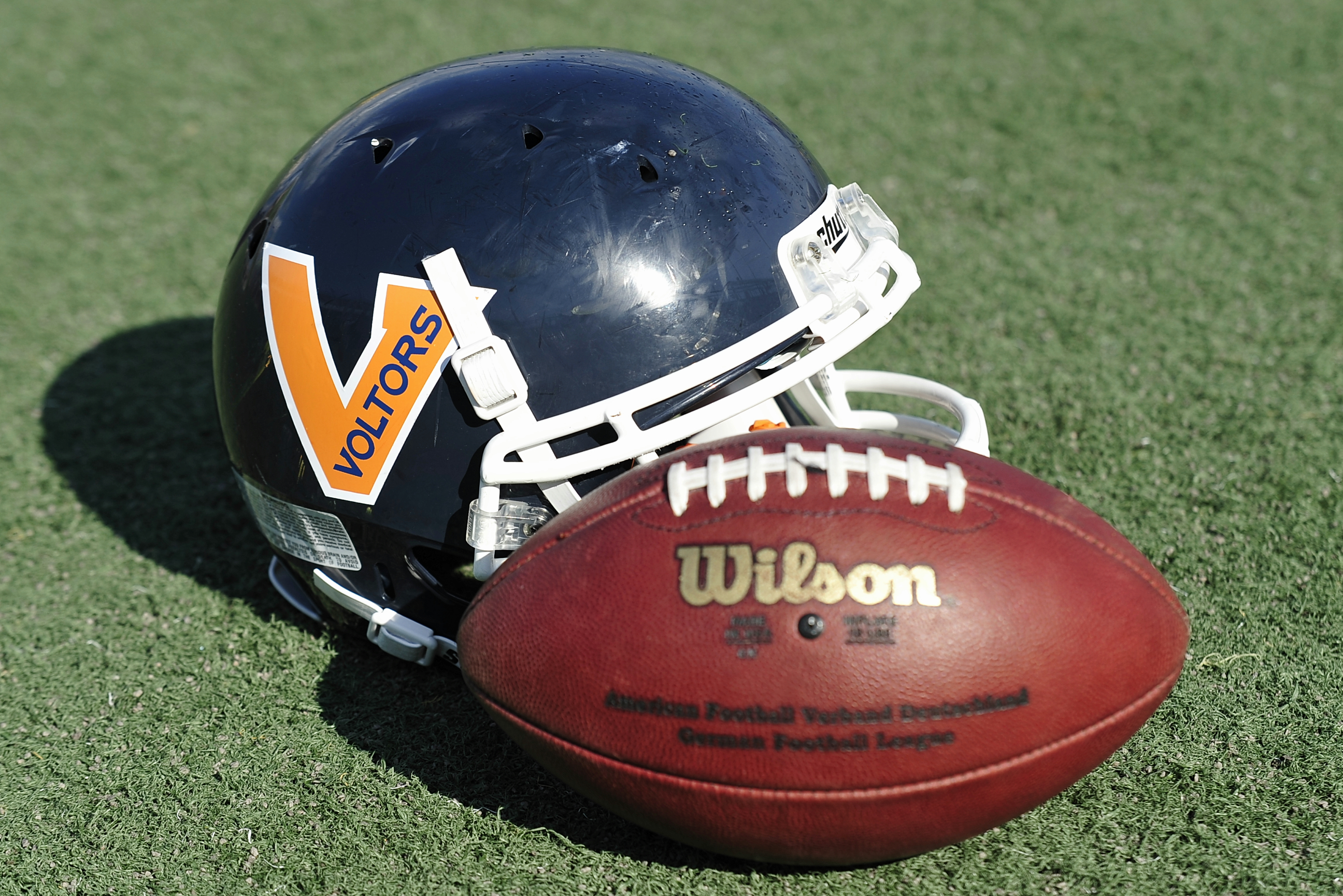
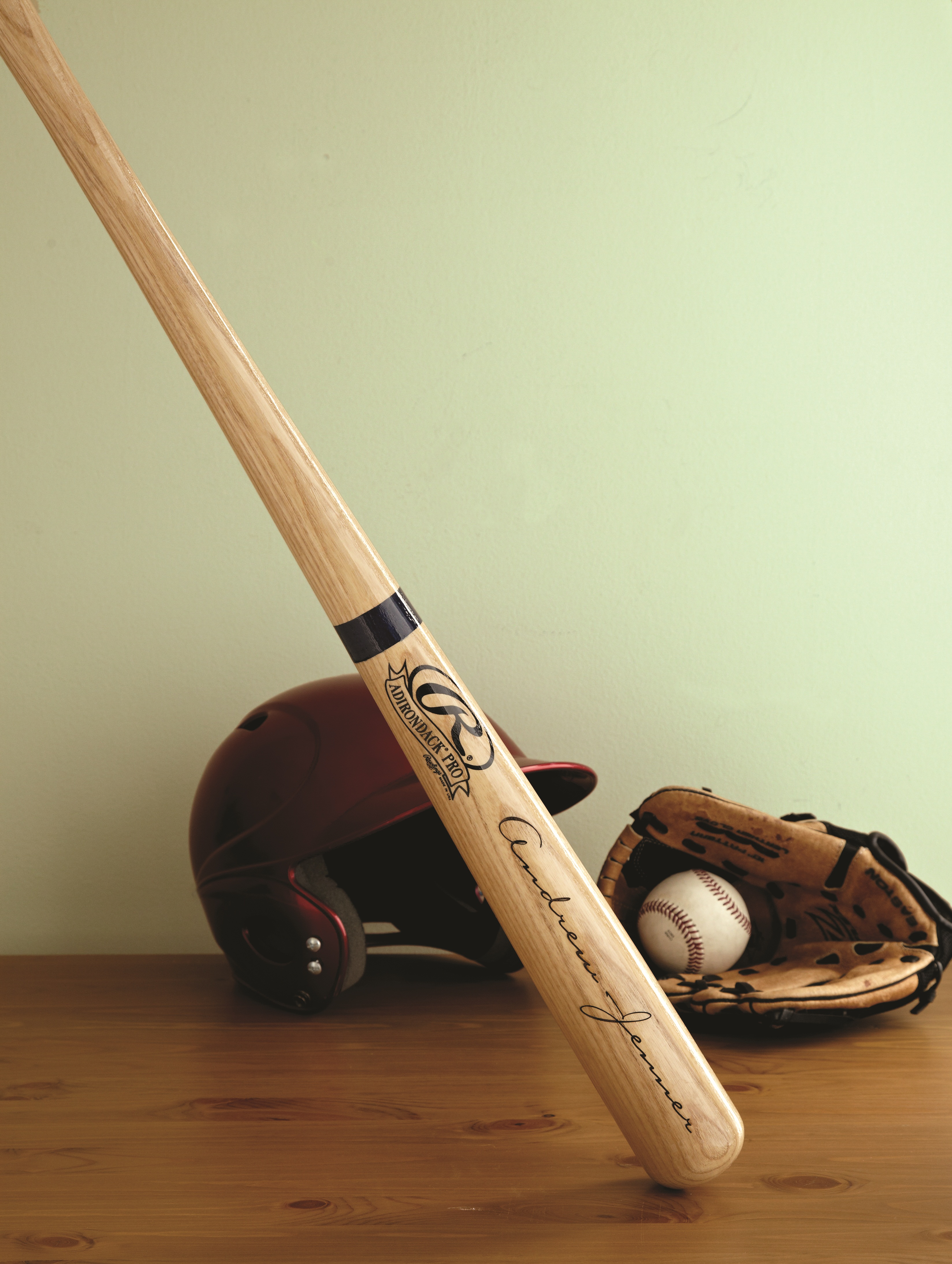
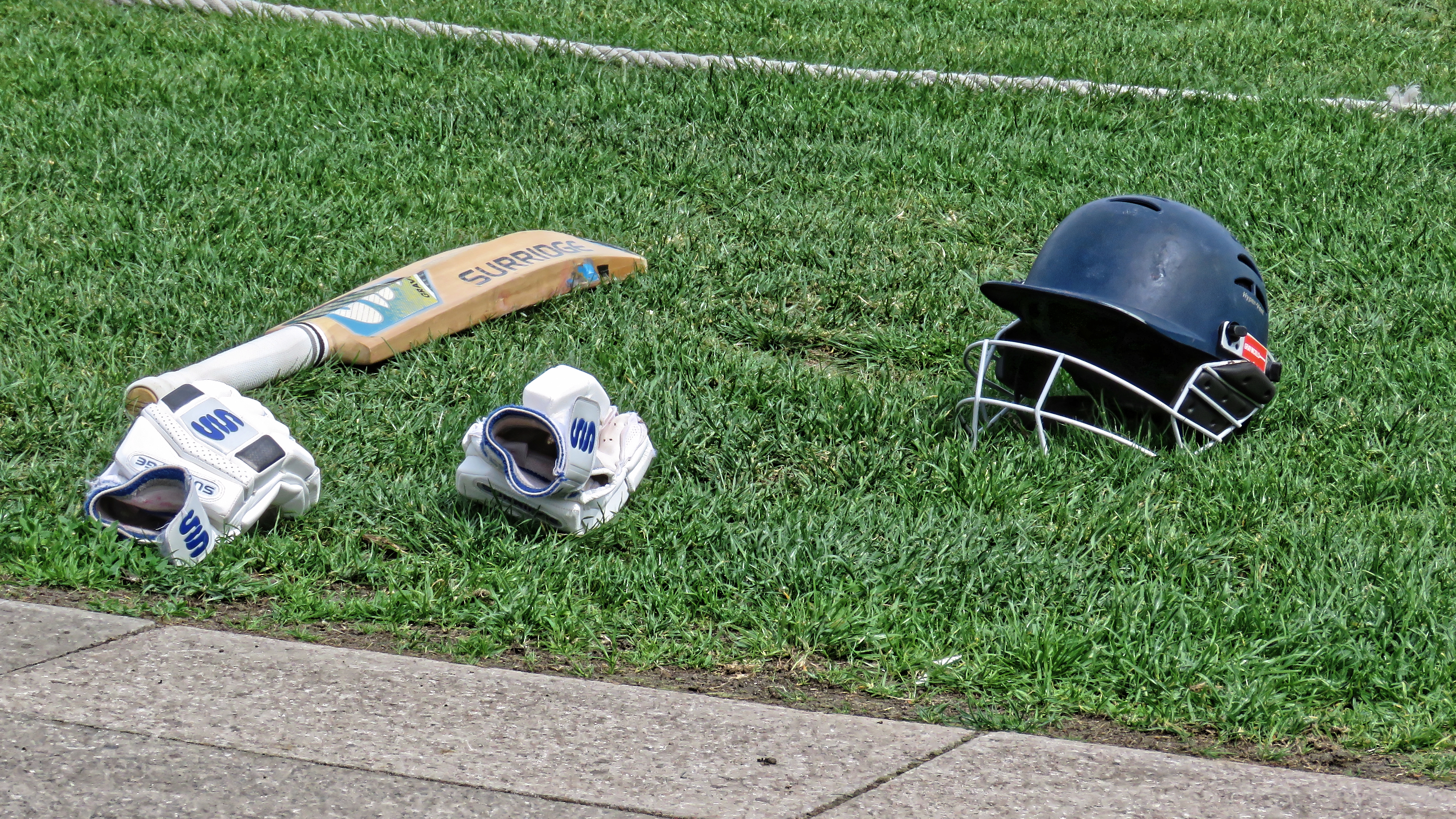
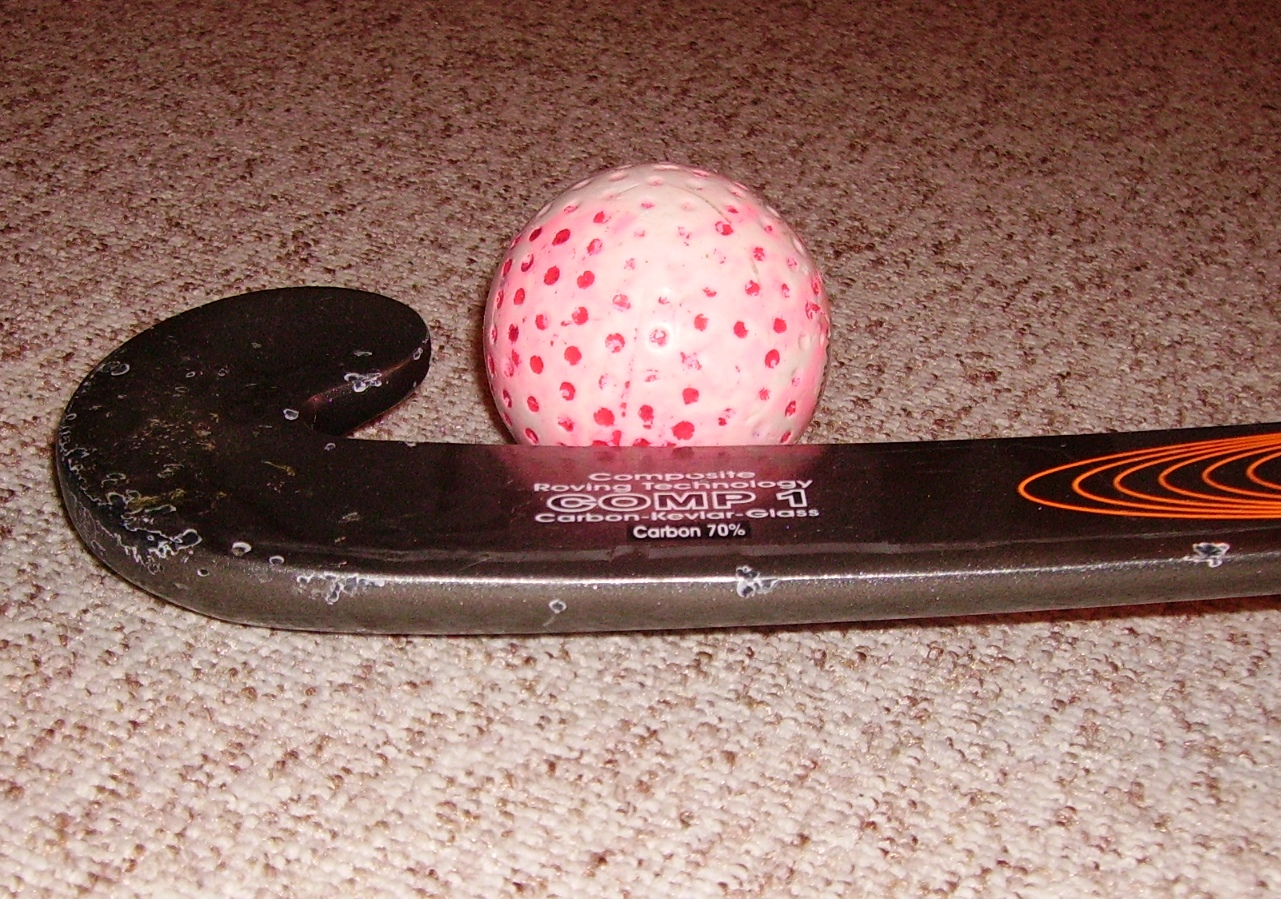
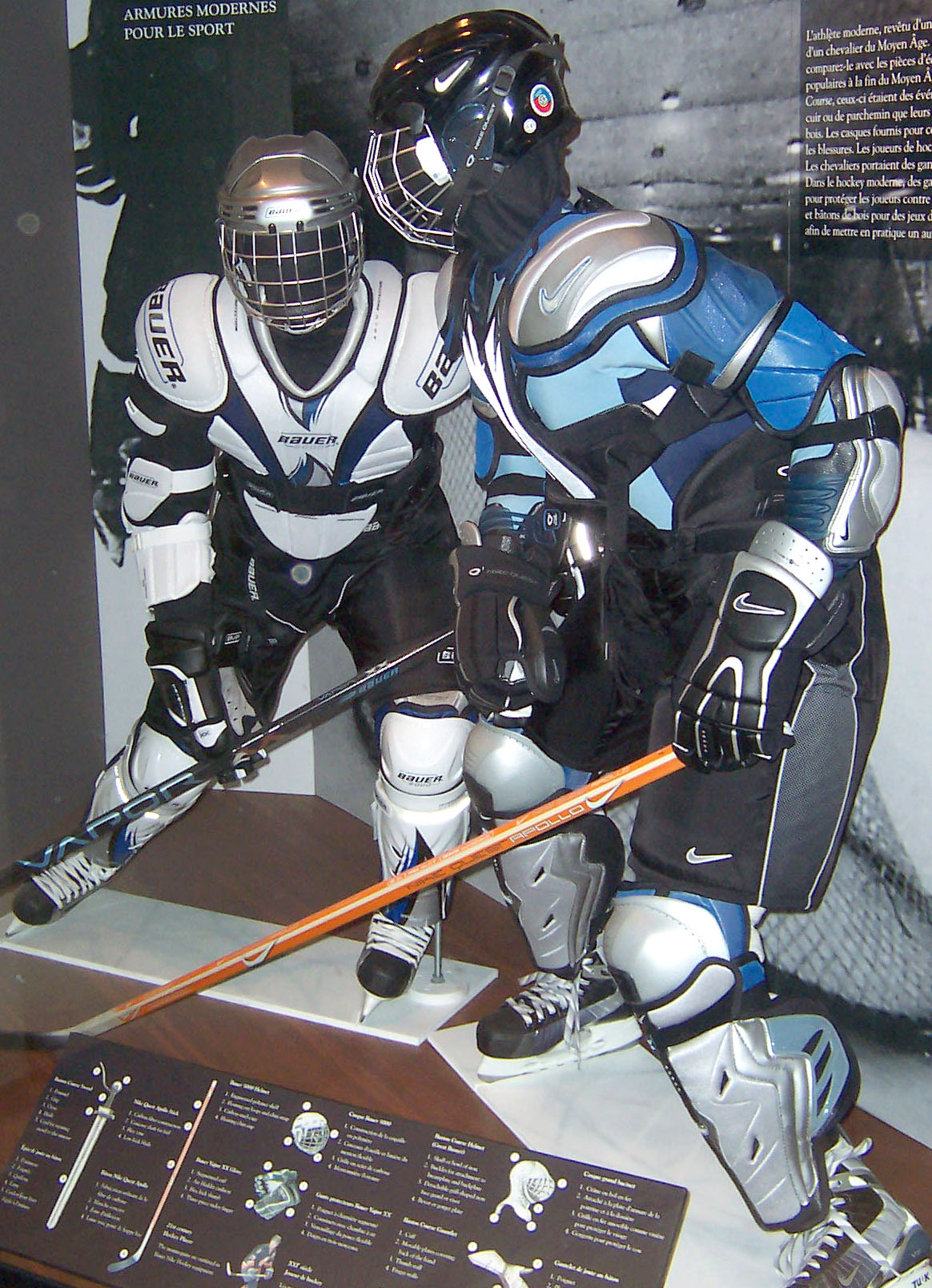
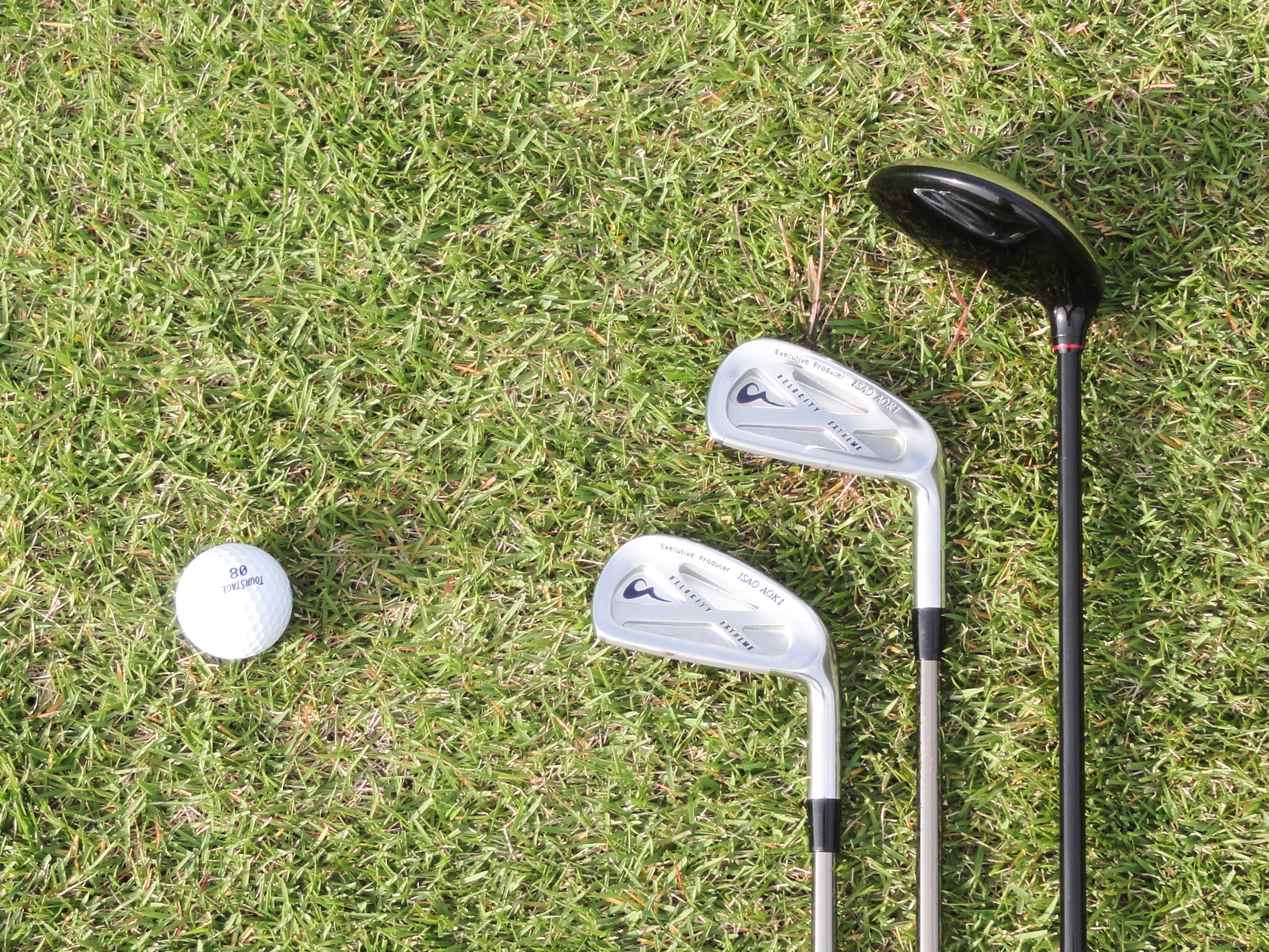
Some sports equipment, from left to right, up to down: American football helmet and ball, baseball equipment (bat, ball, glove and helmet), cricket equipment (helmet, bat and gloves), field hockey stick and ball, ice hockey equipment and golf clubs and ball

Sports equipment, also called sporting goods, are the tools, materials, apparel, and gear that vary in shape, size, and usage in a particular sport. It includes balls, nets, rackets, protective gears like helmets, goggles, etc. Since the performer must use sports equipment, it can also serve for protection. (Note: Over time, sporting equipment has evolved because sports have started to require more protective gear to prevent injuries.)

== History and development of sports ==
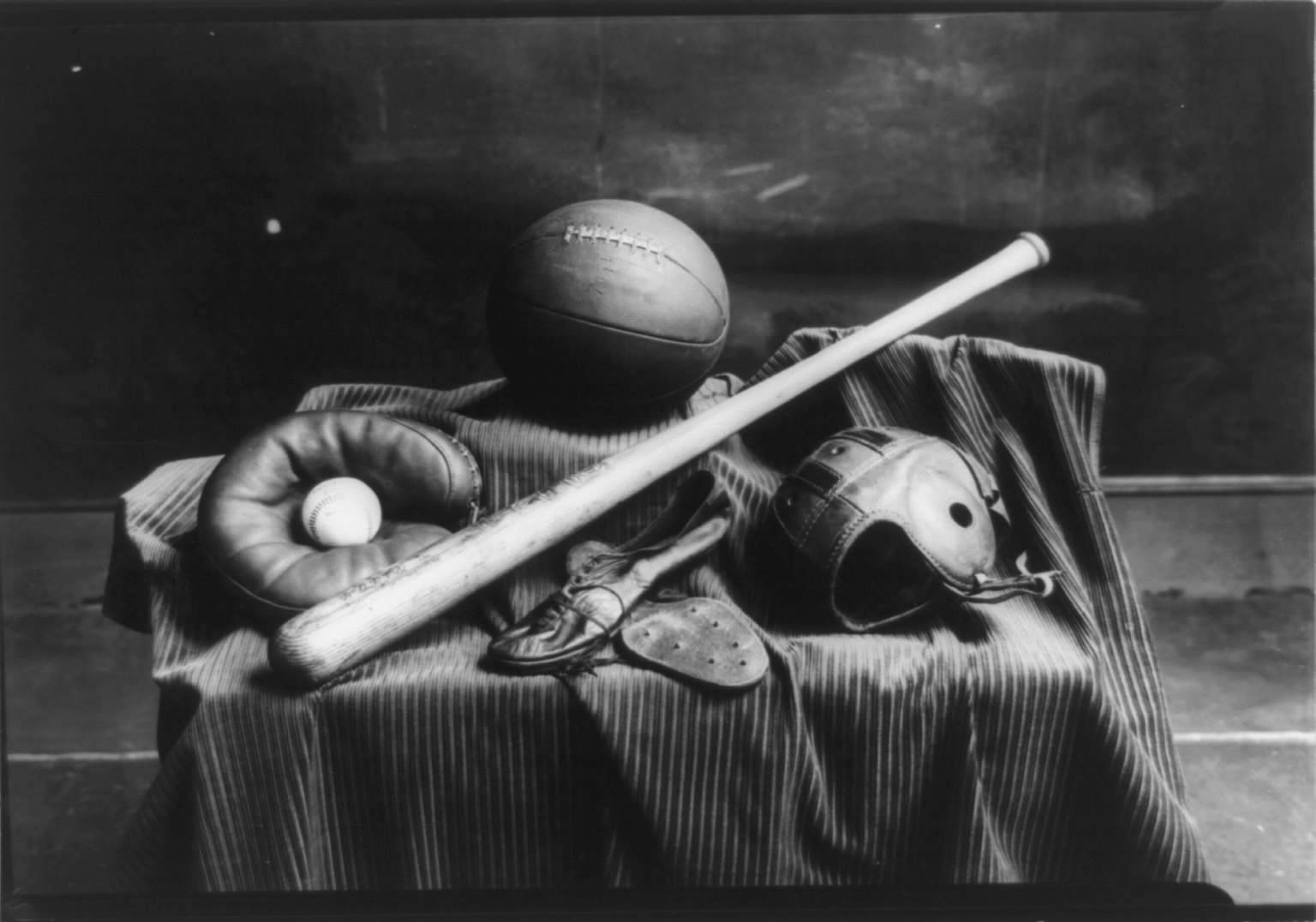
Historic sport equipment

Historically, many sports players have developed their own sporting equipment over time. For instance, the use of a football dates back to ancient China, between the Warring States period (476–221 BC) and the Han Dynasty (220 AD). As football remains the most popular sport in the 21st century, the material of the ball has completely changed over the centuries; from being made out of animal skin, to being lined with multiple layers of polyester or cotton.

As the sporting equipment industry improves, so do the athletes' performance. This is due to the fact that the equipment is more efficient, lighter and stronger, thus forming a biomechanical system that is interacting with the athlete.

Since the massive adoption of wearable, new sport equipment tend to be electronics and connected to deliver data performances.

Standards and monitoring processes apply in certain industries aimed at the elimination of child labour in the manufacturing of sports goods. One example would be the Atlanta Agreement of 1997 in relation to child labour in the football-making industry in Pakistan.

There are well-developed international trade markets for sports equipment: for example, a steady increase in sports equipment trade within the European Union and between EU member states and the rest of the world was reported during the period from 2017 to 2020.

== Game equipment ==
=== Projectiles ===
In ball sports, balls are a key element—usually as part of the scoring mechanism. Sports balls are usually in the shape of a sphere, though they may also be spheroid or ellipsoid. Spherical balls include the baseball, basketball, Gaelic ball, cricket ball, golf ball, lacrosse ball, tennis ball, and the ball used in association football. Spheroid and ellipsoid balls include the gridiron football and rugby ball.

In flying disc sports, frisbees are used for various games such as freestyle, disc golf and ultimate.

In ice hockey and floor hockey, a puck is used.

=== Goal ===
In many games, goal posts are at each end of the playing field. In some games, such as association football, hockey and water polo, the object is to pass the ball or puck between the posts below the crossbar. In basketball, the object is to pass the ball through the basket. In these sports, the goal usually has a net. In other sports, such as those based on rugby, the ball must pass over the crossbar.

=== Nets ===
In tennis, badminton, and volleyball, players launch the projectile over a net which is supported by two posts.

=== Paddles ===
In canoeing and kayaking, a handheld tool used to propel a human-powered watercraft;

- Paddle

In racket sports, such as padel, pickleball, and table tennis, a flat-faced non-netted tool used for striking balls;

- Pickleball paddle
- Table tennis racket

=== Rackets ===
Rackets, a netted tool used for striking balls or shuttlecocks in sports such as tennis, squash and badminton.

=== Rods and tackle ===
Fishing rods and fishing tackle are primarily used for fishing and sport fishing.

=== Sticks, bats, and clubs ===
Sticks are used for sports such as hockey and lacrosse. Bats are used for sports such as baseball, cricket, and rounders. Clubs are used mainly for golf.

=== Wickets and bases ===
Wickets, creases and balls are used in cricket, and bases are used in baseball.

== Player equipment ==
=== Footwear ===
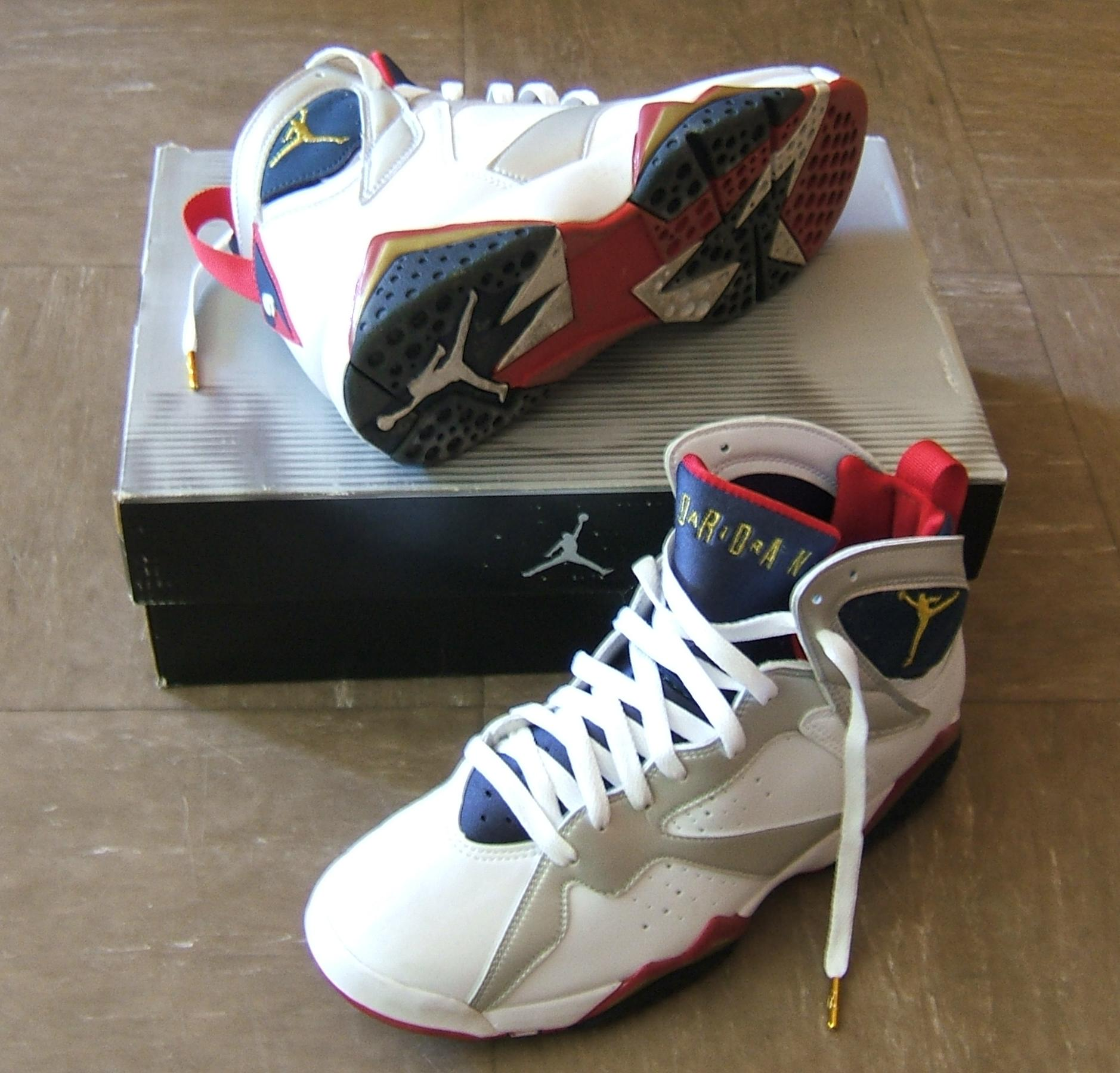
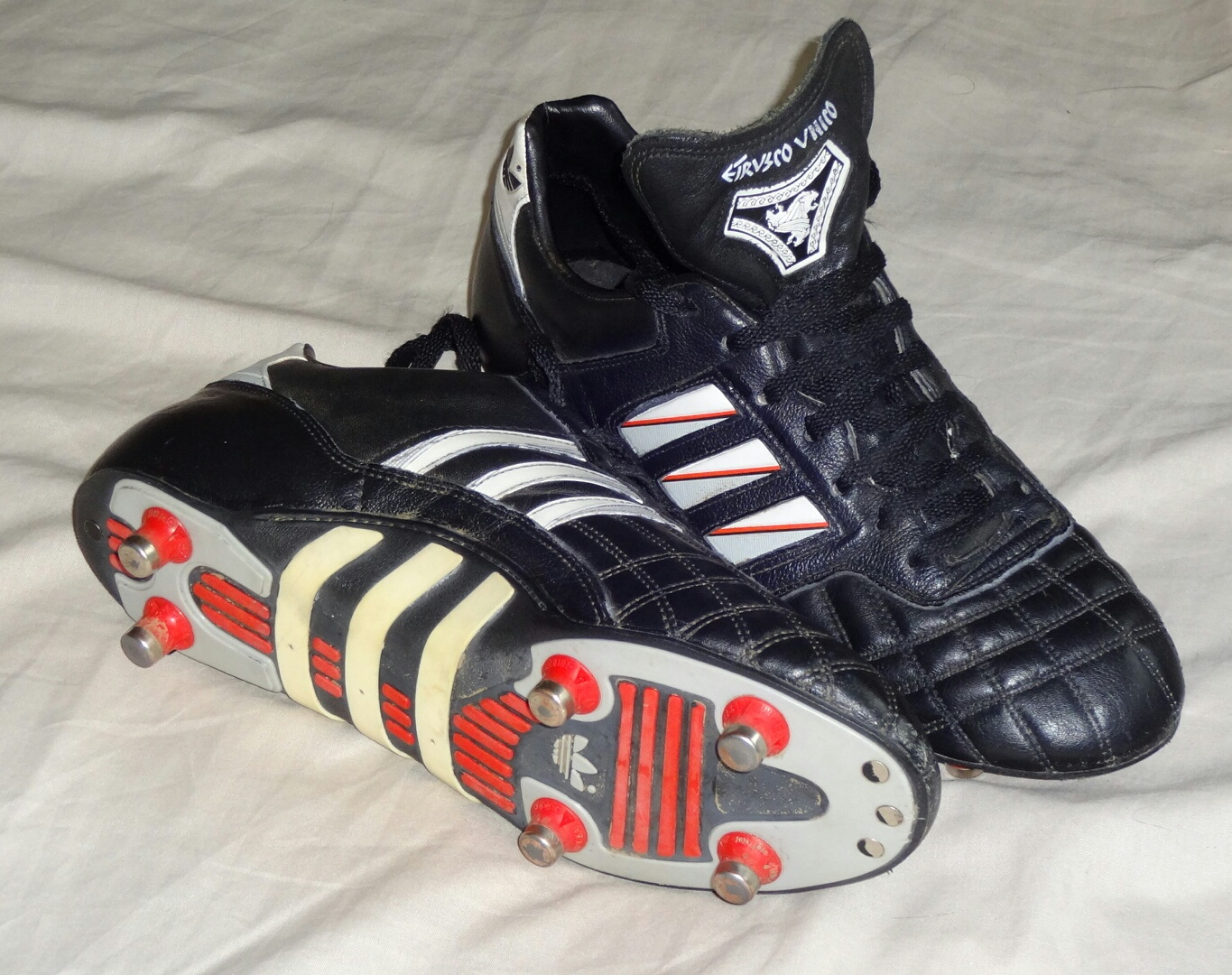
Air Jordan shoe by Nike (left); football boots with metal cleats by Adidas (right)

In many sports, athletes wear cleats. These include cricket spikes, football boots, golf shoes, and track spikes.

Cyclists wear cycling shoes, which may be designed for special interaction with pedals.

Wheeled shoes include roller skates and inline skates.

Skiers wear ski boots, which attach to skis via bindings. Similarly, snowboarders have snowboard boots and bindings.

Athletes wear ice skates in most ice-based sports, although there are exceptions such as broomball and curling.

Athletes with limb differences (such as those in the Paralympics) may use extremity prostheses, such as the Flex-Foot Cheetah running blade.

=== Protective equipment ===
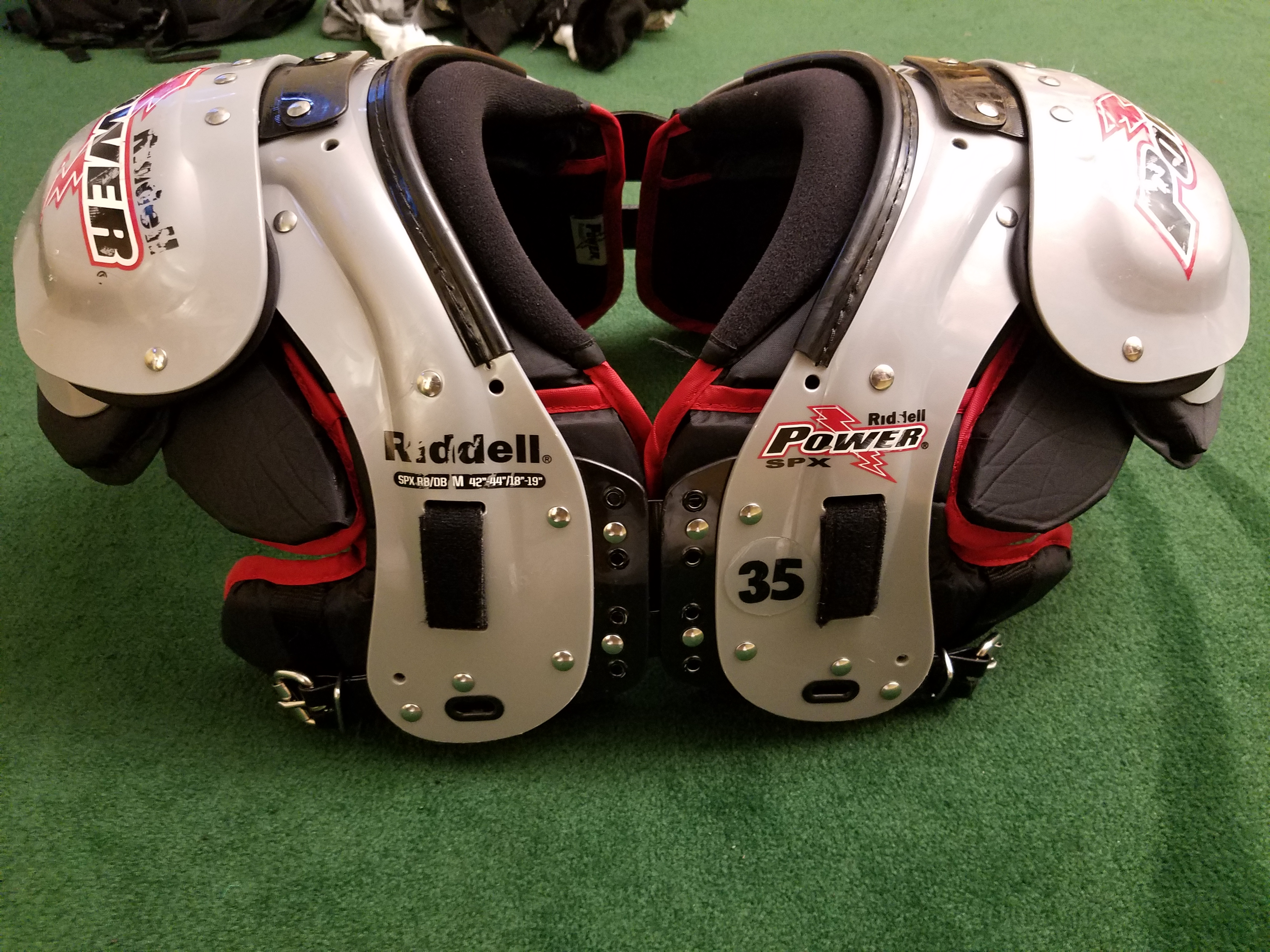
Shoulder pads used in gridiron football and ice hockey

Protective equipment is often worn for sports including motor sport and contact sports, where there is a danger of injury through collision of players or other objects.

In many sports, athletes wear helmets. These include:

- Batting helmet
- Bicycle helmet
- Football helmet
- Hockey helmet
- Motorcycle helmet

Padding is used to protect various body parts, most often as elbow pads, shin pads, and shoulder pads. Specialized equipment, such as the jockstrap and mouthguard, is used to protect certain body parts. Ice hockey players may wear neck guards. Some athletes wear sports gloves to protect their hands.

=== Clothing ===
Many sports have a common set of clothing, usually called a uniform or kit, including the association football kit, baseball uniform, basketball uniform, cricket whites, and cycling kit. As part of the uniform, athletes may wear jerseys; they may also be called shirts, sweaters in ice hockey or guernseys in Australian rules football. These jerseys may change color when the team is on the road.

=== Training equipment ===
Examples of training equipment include swiss balls, resistance bands, tennis balls, balance discs, cones, weights, chin-up bars, weight machines, and gym equipment. Also, protective equipment such as weight lifting belts and bench shirts are used for weight training and powerlifting.

=== Special sports equipment ===
Special sports equipment, is the equipment usually worn by the athletes according to their needs or desires.

- Special equipment in sports branches:
  - Cycling:
    - Cycling jersey: a sleeved jersey covering the upper torso.
    - Bib shorts: the shorts worn by cyclists which come with pads for added comfort.
    - Socks: typically mid-length socks.
    - Cycling shoes: specialised shoes with stiff soles for more efficient energy transfer and cleats cliping into clipless pedals.
  - Football:
    - Football leggings: Football leggings, mostly used in winter. It is used to prevent the body from getting cold and injury due to the cold weather after warm-up training in winter.
    - Football captain's tape: Football captain's tape, is a compulsory (required) piece of equipment. Football captains are chosen by the coach, the accessory provided must be worn by the captain.
    - Football shinguard: Football shinguard, is a special piece of equipment, that football players wear according to their specific wishes.
    - Football bracelet: Football bracelet, is a special need equipment and players write the name of a family member or loved one according to their wishes.
    - Football footband: Football footband, is worn by footballers in the ankle area between the crampons and the toe and is need or for pleasure.
    - Football Visor: Football visor, is a piece of plastic attached to the facemask of the football helmet. It helps prevent damage to the eyes and face.
  - Volleyball:
    - Volleyball wristband: Volleyball wristband, is mostly used by volleyball players. Volleyball players use it for better grip of their hands.
    - Volleyball knee pads: Volleyball knee pads, is the equipment used by volleyball players to protect their knees, when they jump high, jump sideways and fall to the ground.
    - Volleyball leg pads: Volleyball leg pads, allows volleyball players to play safely.
  - Basketball:
    - Basketball sleeve: Basketball sleeve, is a piece of equipment that basketball players wear according to their wishes and tastes and is not mandatory.
    - Basketball armband: Basketball armband, is a piece of equipment that basketball players use according to their tastes or needs.
    - Basketball headband: Basketball headband, is a piece of equipment that basketball players wear according to their wishes and tastes and is not mandatory.
    - Basketball handband: Basketball handband, is like a need for basketball players to protect their hands and grip the ball more comfortably, but it is not mandatory.
    - Basketball bracelet: Basketball bracelet, is a piece of equipment, that is generally used only as an accessory by basketball players.
  - Tennis:
    - Tennis armband: It is a non-mandatory accessory worn by tennis players.
    - Tennis hairband: Tennis headband, is an accessory especially used by athletes according to their own color and taste.
    - Tennis hat: The tennis hat is often used by tennis athletes. Used as an accessory.

== Vehicles ==
Vehicles (sometimes specialized) are used as equipment for some sports, including motor sport, cycling, aeronautics, sailing and hot air ballooning. Golf carts are used by recreational golfers to make their way through the course. A bullpen car is sometimes used by relief pitchers in baseball.

Small vehicles with flatbeds are often used to carry injured athletes off the field, most commonly in American football.

== Various sports ==
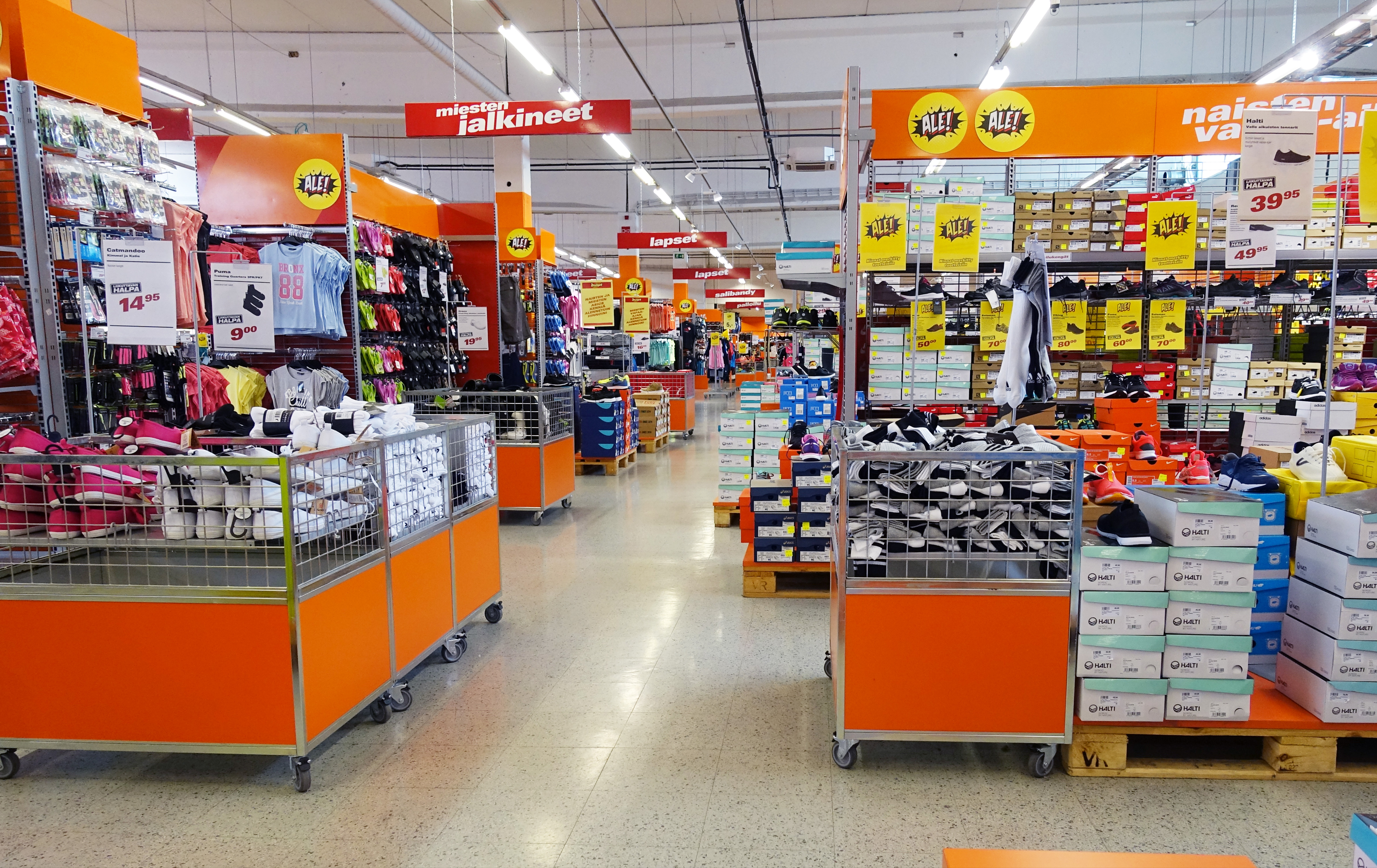
Budget Sport, a sports equipment store in Tampere, Finland

- Category:Sports equipment (various sports)
- Association football clothing and equipment
- Baseball clothing and equipment
- Climbing equipment
- Cricket clothing and equipment
- Cycling kit
- Golf equipment
- Gridiron football equipment
- Ice hockey equipment
- Rugby shirt
- Snowboarding equipment
- Triathlon equipment

== See also ==
- Equipment
- Equipment manager
- Outdoor gym
- Protective equipment
- Chin-up bar
- Athletic Equipment Managers Association
- Protective gear in sports
- Ice sock
