= Finger sleeve =

Protective clothing item

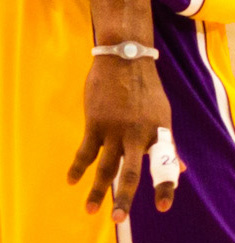
Kobe Bryant's signature finger sleeves bore his jersey number (24).

A finger sleeve is a kind of protective garment, and sometimes a compression garment, that is worn on the fingers. They are generally worn for pain relief and for support and protection for the finger, but can also be worn as a fashion statement, or to improve the wearer's ability to perform certain tasks involving the fingers.

== Basketball ==
Finger sleeves are worn by some basketball players to support and protect their finger joints and for pain relief, as well as to enhance grip on the ball during a shot. It is up to the player's preference on which finger the sleeve is worn. Many, such as Reggie Miller, choose to wear more than one finger sleeve. The use of the finger sleeve is authorized and approved by the National Basketball Association (NBA). In many cases, the finger sleeve is worn for protection as an alternative to performing some sort of taping job on the digit.

=== Notable wearers ===
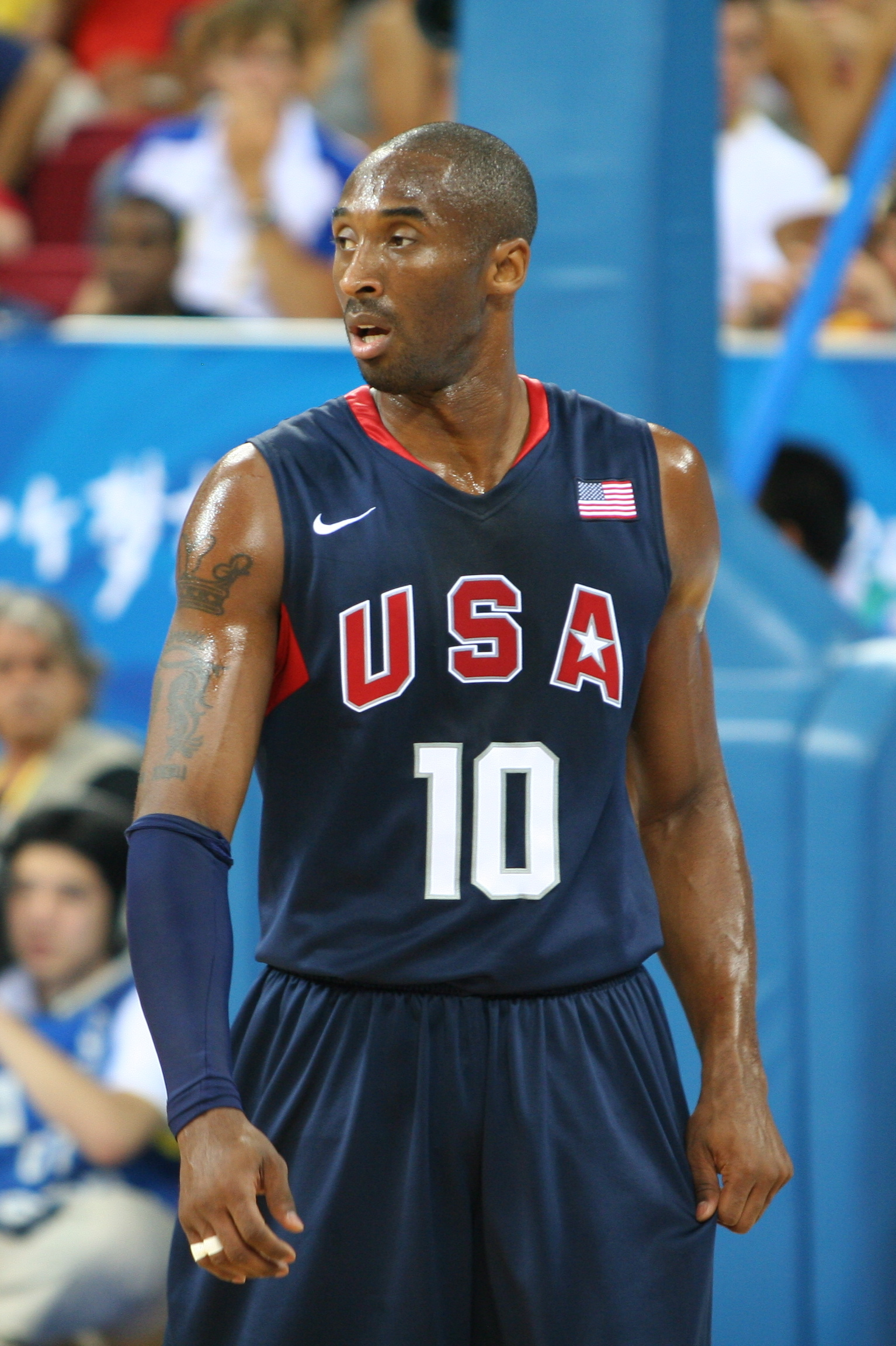
Kobe Bryant wore two finger sleeves at the 2008 Summer Olympics.

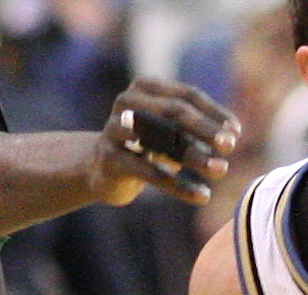
Kevin Garnett sported a black finger sleeve at a game in January 2008.

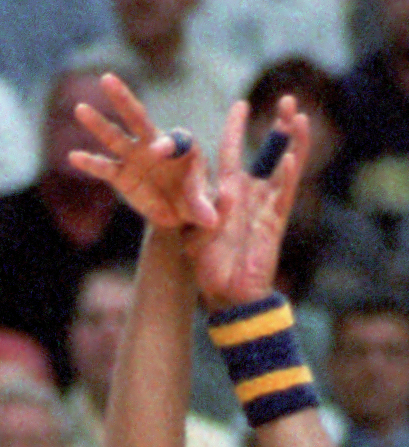
Reggie Miller wearing two finger sleeves and a wristband

Notable people who have worn finger sleeves include:

- Kobe Bryant, who wore them to hold a protective gel pad on his arthritic fingers.
- Anthony Edwards, who began to wear finger sleeves in 2024 after he dislocated his finger.
- Kevin Garnett, who suffered an injury early in his career and wore finger sleeves for many years after.
- LeBron James wore finger sleeves in tribute to Kobe Bryant after his death.
- Doug McDermott
- Reggie Miller

== Gaming ==
Gamers sometimes wear compression finger sleeves.

Razer Inc. offers finger sleeves designed for mobile gaming. They are worn over the fingertip and are designed to increase grip and protect the wearer from friction. They are less than 1 millimetre (0.039 in) thick and are woven with silver fibers so that the barrier does not prevent the touchscreen from reacting to the wearer's finger presses.

== See also ==
- Basketball sleeve
- Compression garment
- Finger splint
- Leg sleeve
- Thimble
