= Demarcus Dobbs =

American football player (born 1987)

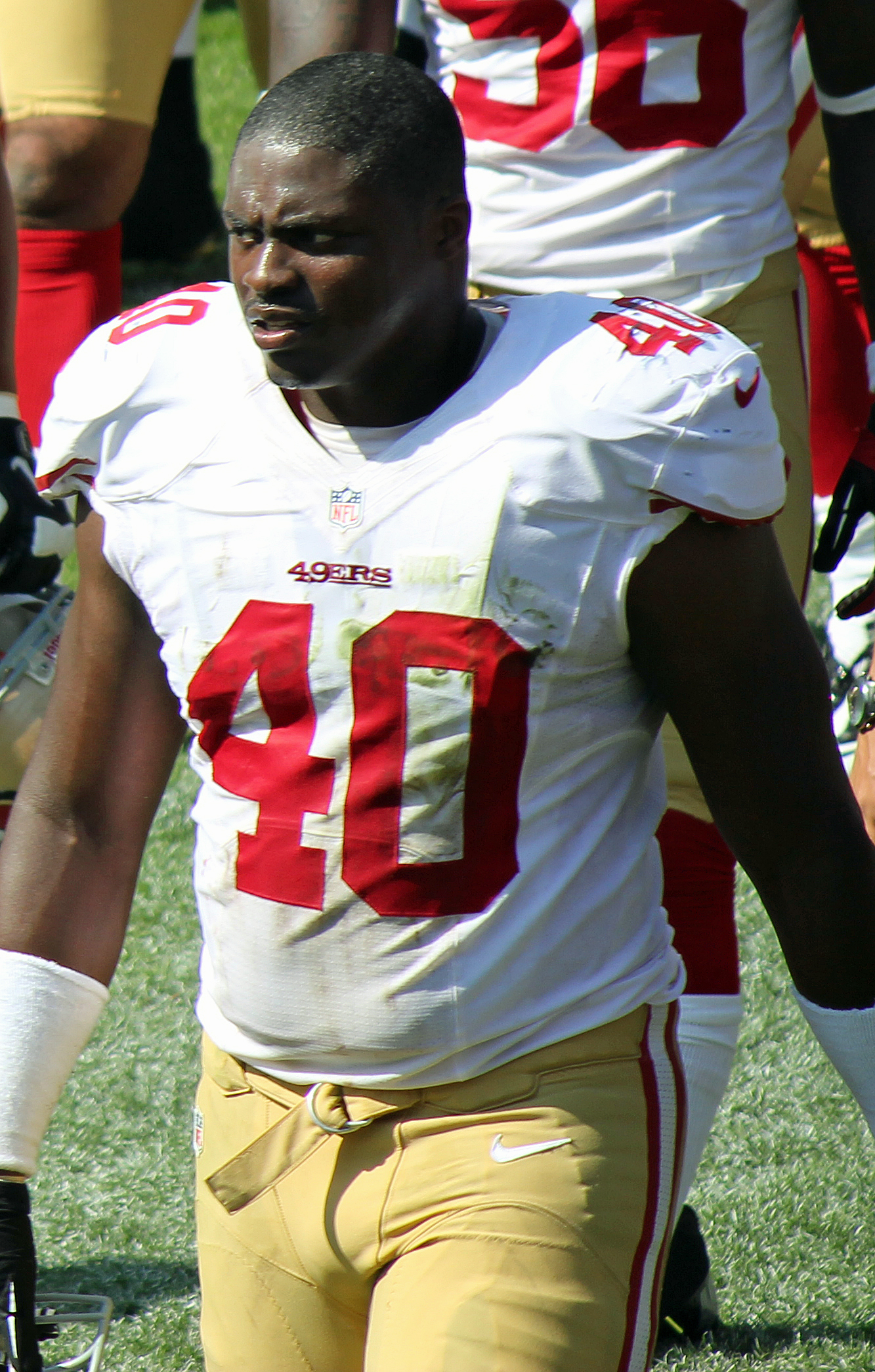
- Dobbs with the San Francisco 49ers

No. 96, 83, 95
- Position: Defensive end

Personal information
- Born: November 30, 1987 (age 38); Savannah, Georgia, U.S.
- Listed height: 6 ft 2 in (1.88 m)
- Listed weight: 282 lb (128 kg)

Career information
- High school: Calvary Baptist Day School
- College: Georgia
- NFL draft: 2011: undrafted

Career history
- San Francisco 49ers (2011–2014); Seattle Seahawks (2014–2015)

Career NFL statistics
- Total tackles: 48
- Pass deflections: 1
- Stats at Pro Football Reference

Demarcus Dobbs (born November 30, 1987) is an American former professional football player who was a defensive end in the National Football League (NFL). He played college football for the Georgia Bulldogs and was signed by the San Francisco 49ers as an undrafted free agent in 2011.

== Early life ==
"We lived in a tiny starter home on Wilmington Island and turned our office into Demarcus' bedroom. We became so close – we loved him, and it would happen – there really wasn't a choice."

— Stephanie Britt, January 2010

Dobbs was born on November 30, 1987, in Savannah, Georgia, and attended Calvary Baptist Day School, where he played on the Cavalier high school football team. When Dobbs was seven years old, he left home and moved into Bethesda Home for Boys with his brother Daniel. He excelled in school and was recruited to play football at Calvary Baptist Day by Danny Britt, the current athletic director at Benedictine Military School. Before high school, "Demarcus had never played football before. Calvary just wanted to give him an education," said Britt. "At that point, I asked him if he would like to try football." Through his freshman and junior years at Calvary Baptist, he remained close with Britt and his family, before eventually being offered to move in with them during his senior year of high school. "Our girls were very small – just 4 and 5 years old at the time – and we were poor. We wondered, 'Can we raise a teenage boy? Can we feed another child?" said Britt's wife, Stephanie. He moved in with the Britts in 2005, forming a close bond with their two daughters. "The girls have always been so excited to be with me, and it's funny when you see us together – I'm so big, and they're so small," said Dobbs.

At Calvary Baptist, he played both tight end and defensive end. As a tight end in his senior year, he caught 14 passes for 259 yards and four touchdowns. He was named to the All-Coastal Empire team as a tight end. On defense, he recorded 78 tackles and six sacks. He was named to the All-Region first-team as a defensive end. Dobbs also played high school basketball for Calvary Baptist, being named to the Savannah Morning News All-City First-team in 2005.

After his senior season in football, he was rated as a three-star recruit by Rivals.com and as a four-star recruit by Scout.com. He was recruited by Ball State University, the University of Alabama at Birmingham, the University of Georgia, Auburn University, and the Georgia Institute of Technology, before ultimately accepting a scholarship to play for the Georgia Bulldogs football team.

Dobbs is a supporter of his former school. When they had an alumni football game put on by Gridiron Alumni Football in March 2012, he was there to do the coin toss. He stood on the sidelines for the whole game as his former teammates rallied against an alumni team from Richmond Hill.

College recruiting
Name	Hometown	School	Height	Weight	40^{‡}	Commit date
Demarcus Dobbs; DE and TE	Savannah, Georgia	Calvary Baptist Day School (GA)	6 ft 3 in (1.91 m)	250 lb (110 kg)	4.98	Oct 11, 2005
Demarcus Dobbs; DE and TE	Recruit ratings: Scout: Rivals:					
Overall recruit ranking:
Note: In many cases, Scout, Rivals, 247Sports, On3, and ESPN may conflict in their listings of height and weight.; In these cases, the average was taken. ESPN grades are on a 100-point scale.; Sources: "2006 Team Ranking". Rivals.com.

== College career ==
"I have to admit I loved the interception for a touchdown. That was big. I was fired up for Demarcus."

— Mark Richt, September 2008

As a true freshman in 2006, Dobbs was redshirted, giving him an extra year of eligibility. The following season, in 2007, he appeared in all 13 of Georgia's games, recording his first collegiate tackle against Hawaii in the 2008 Sugar Bowl. He mainly saw playing time on special teams for Georgia.

In 2008, as a redshirt sophomore, Dobbs made his first career start against Central Michigan, where he recorded a career-high four tackles and an interception, which he returned 78-yards for a touchdown. Against Arizona State, he recorded his first college sack and a forced fumble. He finished the season with four total starts, 19 tackles, two sacks, and two interceptions. The following season, he became a starter for the Bulldogs, starting in all 13 games for the team. He recorded a career-high 39 tackles, recording four tackles on three occasions. He also tallied 4.5 sacks for Georgia. As a senior in 2010, he started in 10 of 13 games, recording 28 tackles. He matched his career-high of four tackles in three games during the season.

Dobbs received the Joseph E. Espy football scholarship three times during his five seasons at Georgia and graduated in December 2010 with a degree in consumer economics.

== Professional career ==
=== San Francisco 49ers ===
After going undrafted in the 2011 NFL draft, Dobbs signed as an undrafted free agent with the San Francisco 49ers. After impressing during training camp, he made the 49ers' final roster. He was one of two undrafted free agents retained by the 49ers after final cuts, with the other being fellow defensive tackle Ian Williams.

During the 2012 preseason, Dobbs began playing the tight end position and his usual spot on the defensive line.

On August 14, 2013, the NFL announced that Dobbs had violated the NFL's policy on substance abuse and would be suspended for the first game of the 2013 regular season. He was waived on November 4, 2014.

=== Seattle Seahawks ===
After being waived by the 49ers, Dobbs signed with the Seattle Seahawks. He re-signed with the Seahawks on March 29, 2015.
