= Equipment manager =

Person in charge of equipment used by a business or organization

An equipment manager is responsible for the procurement, maintenance, repair, inventory, transportation, storage, cleaning, and disposal of equipment used by a business or organization. They ensure that appropriate equipment is available and functional for specific tasks, both on-site and off-site.

In sports, an equipment manager oversees the management of a team’s gear and supplies. In professional and collegiate sports, this is typically a full-time position involving equipment transportation, laundering, repairs, ensuring safety compliance, and routine maintenance such as skate sharpening in ice hockey. The role supports athletes by maintaining the condition and readiness of their equipment.

== Sports equipment ==
See: Sports equipment#Various sports

=== Association football (soccer) ===
See: Kit (association football)#Equipment

In association football, the kit manager or kit man oversees the players' equipment. According to Law 4 (Players' Equipment), the basic equipment required for all players consists of five items: a shirt (also known as a jersey), shorts, socks (also known as stockings), footwear, and shin pads.

=== Golf ===
In golf, the equipment manager oversees the fleet of equipment used on the golf course for turf management. This may include:

- Power take-off Tractors
- Hydraulics or Belt (mechanical) driven Rotary mowers
- Bobcats
- Reel and Bedknife mowers (Hydraulic or belt driven)
- Spray rigs
- Irrigation systems
- Fork lifts
- Front-end loaders
- Gator utility vehicles
- Chain saws
- Trimmers
- Sand Rakers
- Stump grinders
- Golf carts
- Blowers
- Greens rollers
- Pressure washers

And numerous other pieces of equipment a Golf Course or the Turf Care industry employs.

The term has also been used less frequently as a synonym with "Fleet Manager" (fleet management).

=== Ice hockey ===
In ice hockey, the equipment manager takes care of the players and coaches equipment needs by performing the following

- Sharpening skates
- Ordering equipment
- Being prepared on the bench for in-game equipment malfunctions
- Distributing practice gear such as jerseys and socks and pants

== See also ==
- Athletic Equipment Managers Association
- Outline of management
