= Alumni football =

Alumni Football is the practice of playing American Football on behalf of your old alma mater.

== History ==
Alumni football has been around for decades. While there have been a few high schools that have done an alumni football game, there have been several companies that have come and gone attempting to do alumni football games as a business. The first and only one that is still in business, Alumni Football USA, did their first game in 1984 and has done over 1300 games as of November 2024. Dr. R. L. "Bob" Cazet, President and Founder of Alumni Football USA, was the first person to see the potential of full-contact alumni football as a business. In 1984, encouraged by his high school coach, 3-time All-Pro Charlie Toogood, who was a two-way starter for the 1950 NFL World Champion Los Angeles Rams, Bob promoted, developed, and put on a game at his alma mater, St. Helena High School. It was estimated that over 3,000 people showed up at the game, where over 80 former Saints played against each other. Several of Bob's St. Mary's College buddies he played football with at SMC were at the game and pushed Bob to do their games. Slowly, Alumni Football began to spread. Once 400-500 games had been done, Hollywood began to call. Producers from LA to NY began to call and set up meetings for a "reality show." After several meetings with everyone from Disney execs, to the top two guys at Universal Fox, and others, it was decided no one thought it was serious. Many wanted to simply make fun of "older" guys who wanted to get on the field and play American football. Alumni Football USA walked away. It was the best decision. Alumni Football USA is a grassroots organization and will remain so. Over 1,000,000 young men will graduate from high school each year and never play football again. Alumni Football USA..."You Better Get Ready!", "Crunchtime is Back!"

== Current popularity ==
Starting in 2008, Alumni Football USA began spreading Alumni football games across the United States. Since 1984 Alumni Football USA has done over 1300 Alumni football games in 32 states, from Hawaii to New York, raising over $3,000,000 for schools and charities nationwide.

== Types of alumni football ==
There are usually two different types of alumni football. There is flag football and full contact football.

== Values of the game ==
Alumni football allows players to reconnect with their football roots and brings teammates across the decades together on one team. Communities are brought together, and much-needed funds are raised for the specific needs of each community.

== Legal issues ==
There is some legal discussion on whether schools are able to issue school gear to non-students. There are two main issues at debate.

1. Does a school's insurance cover non-student adults playing in a sport on behalf of the school?
2. To distribute equipment meant for students to adults, what safety precautions are needed to protect the student and the adult?
3. Who is governing these safety issues? All equipment needs to be NOCSAE certified before it goes on the body of a student. If it is used after certification by an adult, it could be damaged and be unsafe for use on a student. This damage may not be visible to the eye. That is why reconditioning companies (with NOCSAE Certification) have special machines to test the safety of equipment.

Alumni Football USA owns 1200+ sets of football equipment. They are stationed in several areas of the country from Pittsburgh, Pennsylvania, to Nashville, Tennessee, to Chicago, Illinois, to Dallas, Texas, and Santa Rosa, California. There are 8 trailers with between 120 and 300 sets of gear in each depending on necessity. All equipment is new to as old as 7 years. All gear is purchased new, and they are the largest owner and purchaser of football related equipment in the world.
