= Leg sleeve =

One-legged compression garment

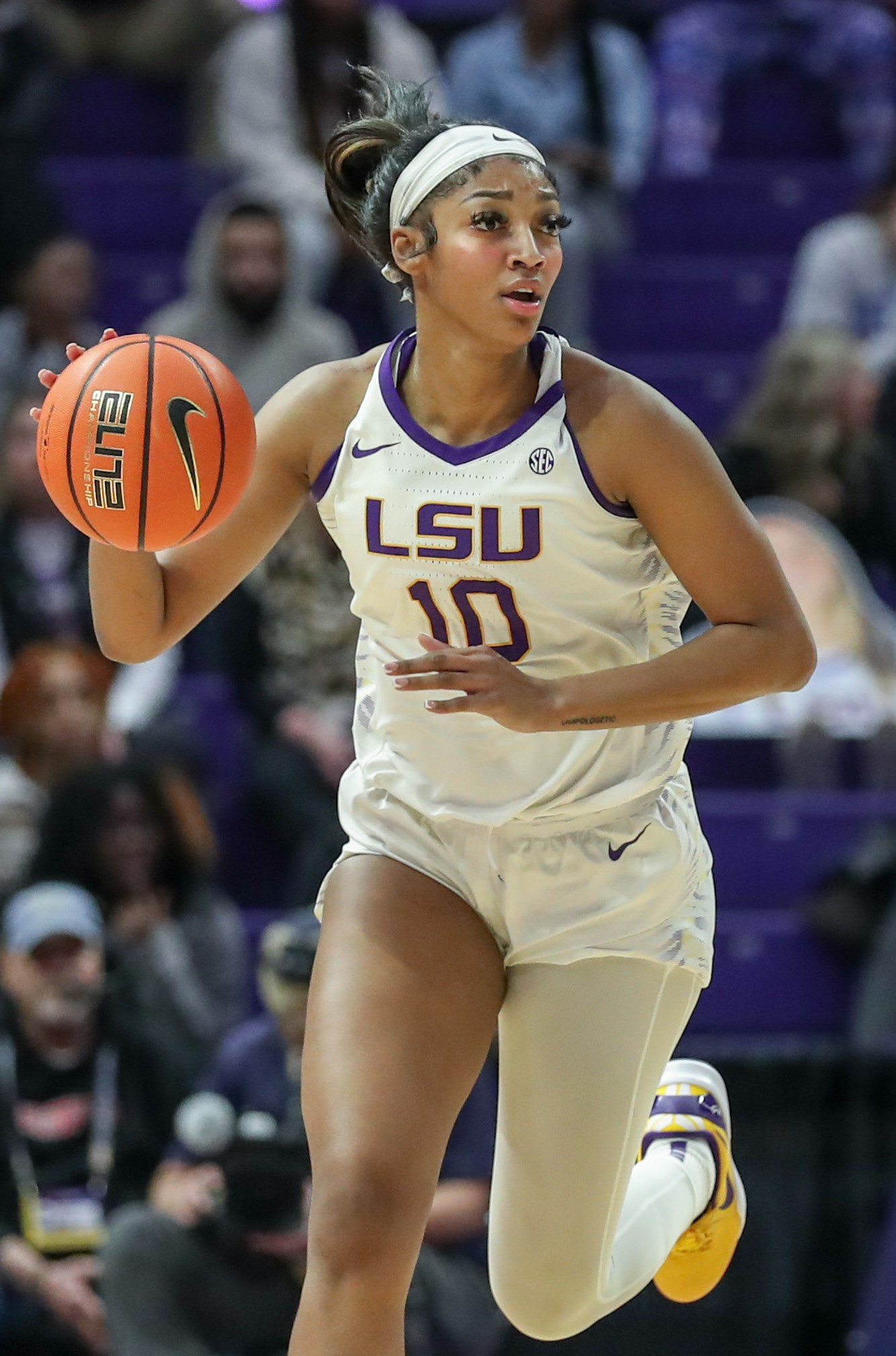
Angel Reese wearing a leg sleeve in 2024

A leg sleeve is a compression garment, similar to leggings but only covering one leg. The accessory became popular in the Women's National Basketball Association (WNBA) after the 2018 season, when rookie A'ja Wilson fashioned a leg sleeve from a pair of leggings and wore it to avoid leg pain. Wilson became associated with the style, and she collaborated with Nike to release a version of the accessory in 2024. Other athletes who have worn leg sleeves include WNBA players Te'a Cooper and Angel Reese and soccer player Lynn Williams.

== Description ==
Leg sleeves are a compression garment worn to optimize blood flow. They are often padded or moisture-wicking. Basketball players may wear a sleeve on one or both legs.

== History ==
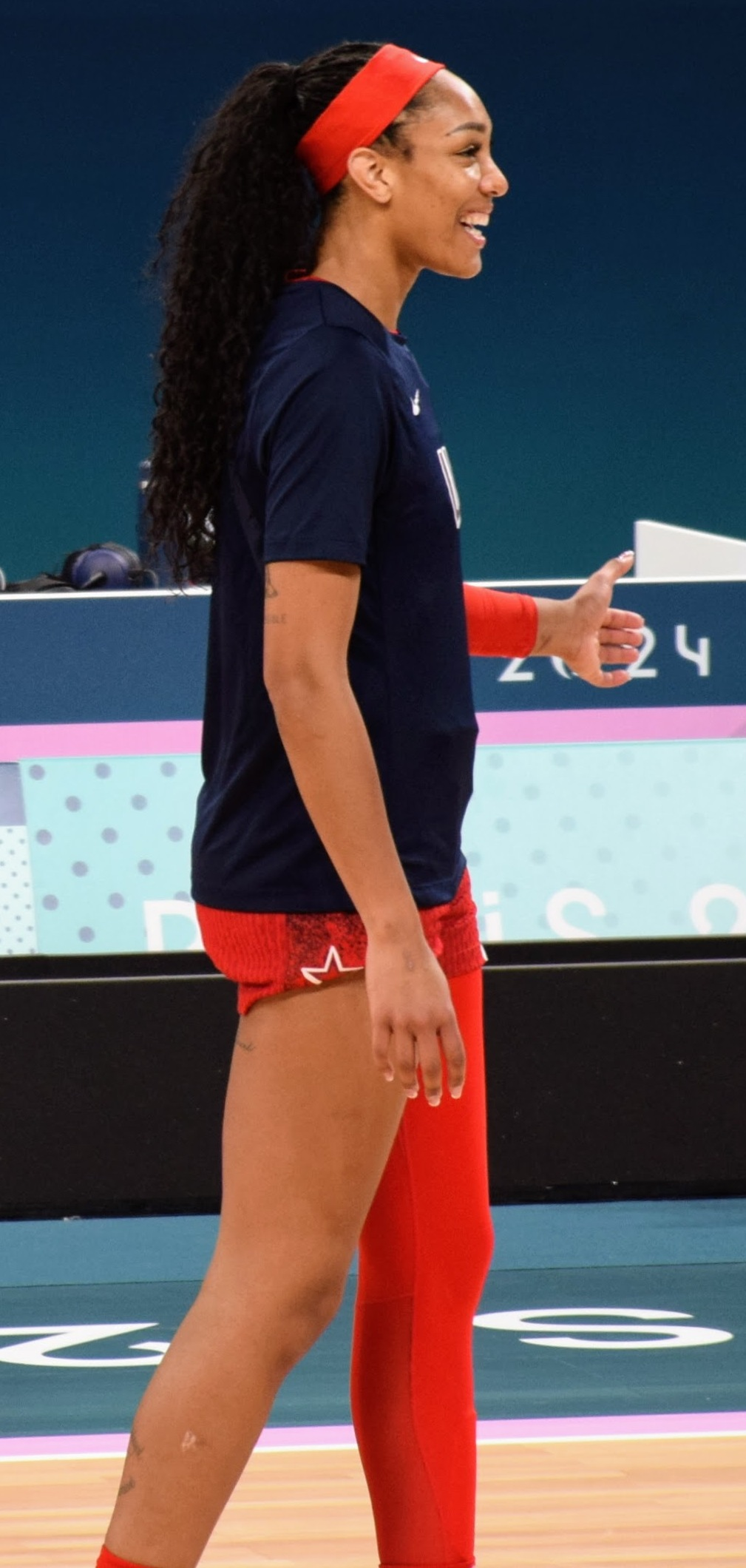
A'ja Wilson (pictured in 2024) started the leg sleeve trend.

A precursor to the leg sleeve was the one-legged catsuit often worn by sprinter Florence Griffith Joyner in the 1980s. Arm and leg sleeves first became a trend in the National Basketball Association (NBA) in the 2000s, popularized by Allen Iverson. In the 2010s, two-legged compression leggings were a popular accessory in the Women's National Basketball Association (WNBA). A'ja Wilson set a trend of wearing leg sleeves in 2018, her first WNBA season. She was the only player that season to wear a single leg sleeve. Some fans have credited Te'a Cooper with originating the style, though she first wore it a year after Wilson.

Wilson began wearing a leg sleeve when her first day of training resulted in discomfort in her left leg, and a trainer suggested that she keep her leg warm. She disliked the restrictive feeling of leggings, so she cut a pair of leggings to only cover one leg. This became a tradition for Wilson, who hand-cut a leg sleeve at the beginning of every WNBA season. She wore leg sleeves at every competition except for the 2020 Olympics, due to a team uniform rule.

In the 2019 WNBA season, Wilson began noticing fans on social media emulating her style and receiving messages about it. As she gained fame, the trend became popular among WNBA players. She told The Washington Post in 2024, "I didn't think it was something that people would pay attention to," and said, "I feel like it's a part of my legacy." Some players, such as Michaela Onyenwere, began to wear leg sleeves as they recovered from injuries. Others simply found it fashionable. In the 2024 season, twenty-four players on eleven teams wore a leg sleeve. Angel Reese, a player known for her fashion, began wearing a left leg sleeve to cover up a scar from an injury in her first year of college basketball. She also considered it an homage to Wilson and Cooper.

The leg sleeve spread beyond women's basketball. At the 2024 Summer Olympics, players on the United States' women's soccer and men's basketball teams wore the accessory. Soccer player Lynn Williams began wearing the leg sleeve leading up to these Olympics and became known for the style. That year, many NBA and Men's March Madness players wore leg sleeves, and Nike launched a product line in collaboration with Wilson that included one-legged leggings.
