= Ice sock =

Cycling equipment

An ice sock is a sock filled with ice, used by cyclists participating in brevets (long-distance rides) to avoid overheating. A women's stocking is filled with ice, which the cyclist places inside their jersey on their back. This is a low-cost and effective method to keep the cyclist's temperature in check and prevent overheating.

Other mentions of ice socks include cold weather sock products to offer feet protection against cold weather, as well as ice melt socks to prevent ice dams on roofs.
