= National Operating Committee on Standards for Athletic Equipment =

NOCSAE
- National Operating Committee on Standards for Athletic Equipment
- Pronunciation: NOKH-see
- Established: 1968
- Type: Nonprofit organization
- Legal status: 501(c)(3)
- Purpose: Standards development for protective sports equipment.
- Location: Overland Park, Kansas, U.S.
- Executive Director / Legal Counsel: Mike Oliver
- Research Director: Kim Barber Foss
- Technical Director: Elizabeth McCalley
- Website: nocsae.org

The National Operating Committee on Standards for Athletic Equipment (NOCSAE, pronounced /'nɒxsi/ NOKH-see) is a nonprofit standards organization which develops standards for the manufacture of certain protective athletic equipment in the sports of baseball, football, hockey, lacrosse, and polo. NOCSAE conducts and funds scientific research and collects and analyzes data relating to standards development.

The organization's office is in Overland Park, Kansas. The NOCSAE annual operating budget is primarily funded through licensing fees NOCSAE charges to manufacturing companies that have had their equipment certified compliant to standards by a third-party certifying organization.

== History ==
In 1967, the National Collegiate Athletic Association's Equipment and Injuries Committee recommended the establishment of an organization capable of collecting and organizing data on injuries to the head, neck, and spine that were related to football helmets. This Committee was responding to the deaths of 32 players in American organized football. In 1968, NOCSAE was officially organized through the combined efforts of the National Collegiate Athletic Association (NCAA), the American College Health Association, the National Federation of State High School Associations (NFHS), and the Sports Fitness Industry Association (SFIA), to develop a football helmet standard effective in reducing or eliminating fatalities from head injuries such as skull fractures and subdural bleeding. NOCSAE's work broadened later into enhancing "athlete safety through scientific research, education, and where feasible, the creation of performance standards for protective equipment."

In 1970, NOCSAE incorporated as a 501(c)(3), nonprofit organization. In 1973, NOCSAE's first equipment standard and first standard test method were developed. The equipment standard, document ND002, specified performance parameters for newly manufactured football helmets. The standard test method, document ND001, described laboratory equipment and basic requirements pertinent to testing headgear and other equipment. The NOCSAE helmet standard was the first standard to require the use of a biofidelic headform in testing for compliance. The standard was also unique in its requirement that helmets meet a certain injury threshold criteria, referred to as the Gadd Severity Index or Severity Index (SI). The SI threshold works by limiting the magnitude of linear head accelerations that result when the helmet is struck. It is a pass-or-fail test which incorporates both impact force and time duration (SI), and requires low-speed and high-speed certification impacts. Test methods have since been expanded to include other impact measurements.

In 1978, the NCAA modified their rules of play to require helmets certified to NOCSAE's standard.

In 1980, the NFHS incorporated the NOCSAE football helmet standard into their rules of play.

In 2017, the United States Polo Association (USPA) mandated helmets certified to the NOCSAE ND050 Standard Performance Specification. In 2019, NOCSAE became an ANSI accredited National Standards Developer. The same year, the NFSHS began requiring that all balls used in high school baseball competition meet the NOCSAE standard.

In 2020, the USPA mandate of helmets certified to the NOCSAE standard took effect. The same year, the NFSHS began requiring catchers wear chest protectors certified to the NOCSAE commotio cordis protective device standard, ND200. Beginning in January 2021, the NCAA required lacrosse goalkeepers and field players to wear protective equipment certified to the ND200 standard.

== Process ==
The process of developing NOCSAE standards is subject to ANSI's principles of "due process, transparency, and openness", and depends heavily on data-gathering and consensus among stakeholder groups represented on the NOCSAE Standards Committee. NOCSAE bylaws and ANSI accreditation rules also require a balance of the interests among these stakeholder groups so that no single group has control. The board members who represent these groups give input during the standards development process and through their work as members of the NOCSAE Standards Committee. NOCSAE performance standards are intentionally "design neutral" and do not specify product materials or technology features to avoid limiting innovation.

=== Standards enforcement and compliance ===
NOCSAE is part of the voluntary standards system in the U.S. A voluntary system is considered preferable, as opposed to a government mandated system, because greater flexibility is possible in responding to changes in technology and market demand. As a part of this voluntary system, NOCSAE has no authority to enforce its standards except with equipment-maker licensees whose products have been certified by an A2LA accredited certification program provider. NOCSAE standards are enforced, however, by several sport governing bodies which have mandated the use of NOCSAE-compliant equipment through their rules of play, including the National Collegiate Athletic Association (NCAA), the United States Polo Association (USPA), the National Federation of State High School Associations (NFSHS), USA Lacrosse, and the National Football League (NFL).

Determination of equipment compliance to NOCSAE standards is by a third-party certification program provider. The current program provider is Safety Equipment Institute, SEI, which is A2LA accredited in accordance with "7389.01: ISO/IEC 17065:2012 Product Certification Bodies."

=== Third-party equipment certification ===
Compliance of equipment to NOCSAE performance standards is "determined by the ability of equipment to withstand certain physical forces"; meaning, this is how the equipment must "perform" to be compliant to the applicable NOCSAE standard.

NOCSAE testing standards specify how products will be tested to certify that the equipment complies with the applicable standard, but the certifying process is carried out independently of NOCSAE by a certifying organization, Safety Equipment Institute (SEI).

To be certified compliant to a NOCSAE standard, equipment models must score less than 1200 SI on each of 16 impacts at 12 mph including two at high temperatures and two randomly selected locations, plus seven additional impacts at two different lower speeds which have lower SI threshold requirements.

Equipment manufacturers apply to SEI to have their new equipment models tested to confirm that the products perform as is required by the NOCSAE standard applicable to the product type. Another part of the SEI certifying process requires manufacturers who participate in the certification program to pass a quality assurance audit of their facility and operate in accordance with SEI quality assurance requirements. Equipment models which have met the quality control and assurance requirements, and which have met the certification testing requirements, can display a SEI certification label, signifying that the model is compliant with NOCSAE standards.

== Board membership ==
The NOCSAE Board of Directors is composed of representatives selected by national organizations representing stakeholder groups that fall into three general categories. The first category is made up of end-users and groups with direct athlete involvement, which includes two members from the National Athletic Trainers' Association (NATA), the Athletic Equipment Managers Association (AEMA), and the American Football Coaches Association (AFCA). NOCSAE directors representing sports medicine and related scientific research interests category include representatives from the American College of Sports Medicine (ACSM), the American College Health Association (ACHA), American Orthopaedic Society for Sports Medicine (AOSSM), the American Academy of Pediatrics (AAP), and the American Medical Society for Sports Medicine (AMSSM). NOCSAE directors representing product and manufacturing interests are selected by the Sports and Fitness Industry Association (SFIA) and the National Athletic Equipment Reconditioners Association (NAERA). In order to maintain balance between the interests represented and to preclude control by any group or interest, some organizations have one seat, while others have two.

NOCSAE also has two non-voting directors, one representing the National Federation of State High School Associations (NFHS) and one representing the National Collegiate Athletic Association (NCAA).
