= Basketball sleeve =

Accessory that some basketball players wear

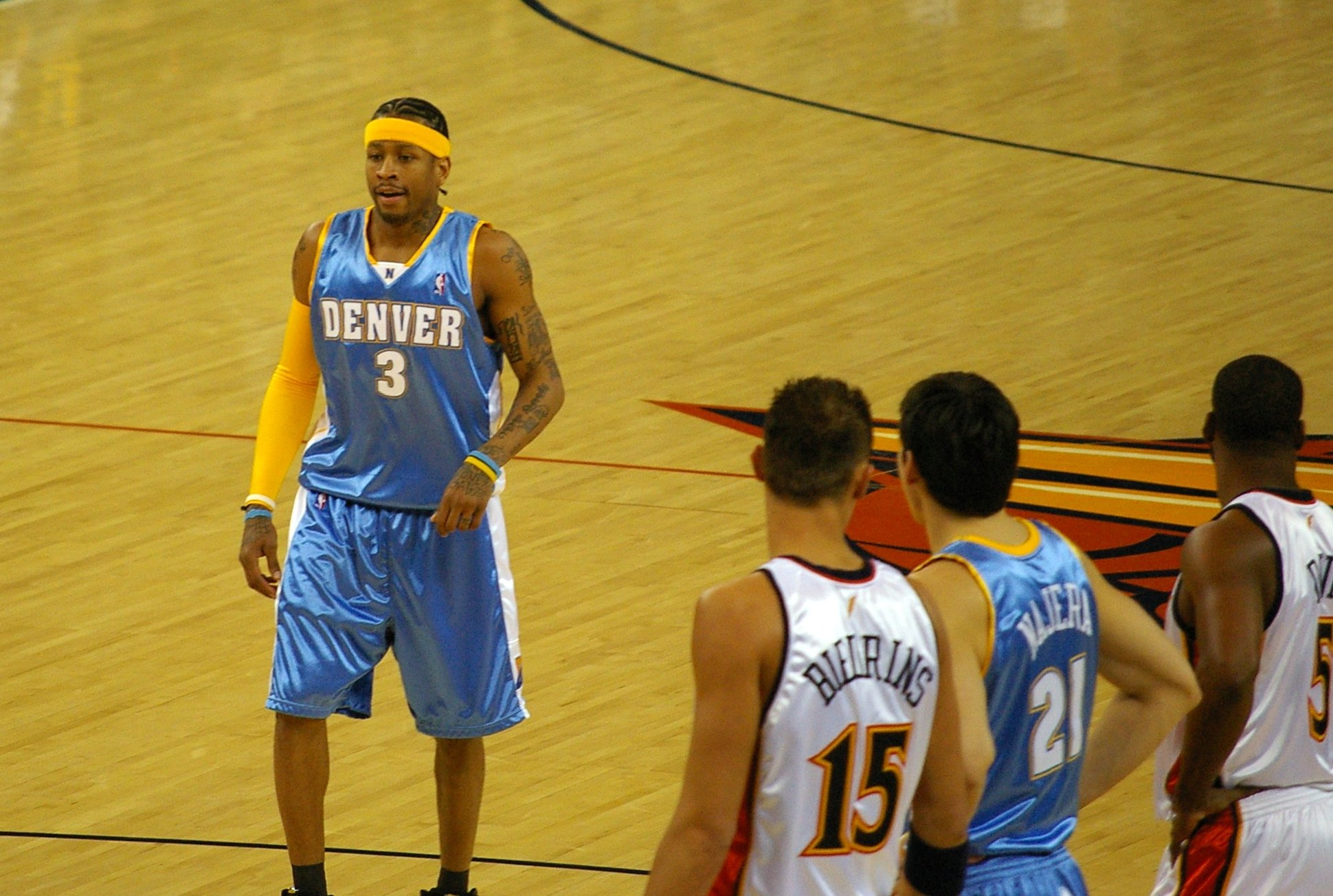
Allen Iverson (#3) wearing a basketball sleeve in a Denver Nuggets game against the Golden State Warriors.

A basketball sleeve, like the wristband, is an accessory that some basketball players wear. Made out of nylon and spandex, it extends from the biceps to the wrist. It is sometimes called a shooter sleeve or an arm sleeve.

== Origins ==
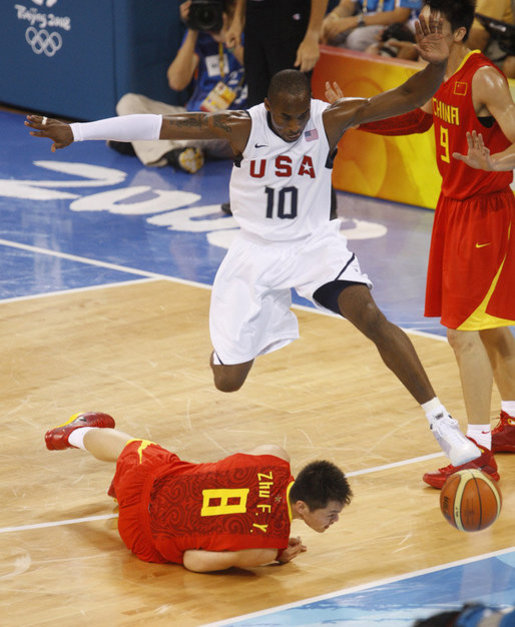
Kobe Bryant wearing a basketball sleeve during an international game.

Allen Iverson began using a basketball sleeve during the 2000-01 season due to bursitis in his right elbow. Afterward, fans wore the sleeve as a fashion statement, and by 2008, the sleeves were the most popular non-apparel items sold by the league. According to an NBA Store spokesperson. Other players, including Ray Allen, Vince Carter, Russell Westbrook, Chris Paul, Carmelo Anthony, Dwight Howard, Paul Pierce, John Wall, Kyrie Irving, Dwyane Wade, Paul George, Kobe Bryant, and LeBron James have worn the sleeves as well.

Iverson continued wearing his basketball sleeve long after his elbow had healed. Some players believe the mild compression they provide helps keep their shooting arm warm and improves circulation. Although some studies show improved circulation and reduced soreness, there has been no definitive study on the use of basketball sleeves.

== See also ==
- Armband
- Basketball uniform
- Finger sleeve
- Wristband
