= Athletic Equipment Managers Association =

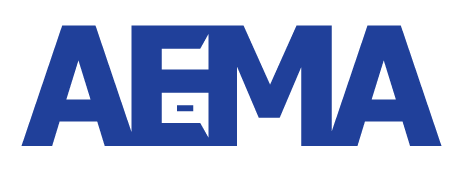
- Official logo of the AEMA
- Nickname: AEMA
- Formation: 1974
- Type: Professional association
- Headquarters: Bement, IL
- Members: Over 1,000 members
- Official language: English
- Interim Executive Director: Matthew Althoff, E.M.C.
- President: Will Rodecap, E.M.C.
- Vice President: Scott Jess, E.M.C.
- Website: https://equipmentmanagers.org/

The Athletic Equipment Managers Association (AEMA) is a professional membership association for equipment managers who support the athletic equipment profession.

Founded in 1974, the AEMA has grown into a worldwide association of certified equipment managers at the professional, collegiate, and amateur level who work as a group to bring about equipment improvements for the greater safety of all participants in sport and recreation. Members of the AEMA enjoy the opportunity to meet their equipment colleagues at annual conventions, share ideas, and learn more efficient techniques to improve their workplace for their athletes, coaches, and support staff.

== History ==
The first documented original meeting was held in Atlanta, Georgia in June 1973. A committee was formed and the group was named The National Equipment Men's Association.

Membership started with 25 members in 1974 with Harry Yalocki as the first Executive Director and Tom Burton as the first President. Helen Sharp became the first Administrative Assistant manager and started the office with her husband, Glenn Sharp.

The first national organization meeting "Convention" was held in 1974 in Kansas City, Missouri where the name Athletic Equipment Managers Association was born and created. At this first convention, a formal Executive Board was found and Jon Falk was appointed the first National Membership chairman.

The AEMA continues to grow and evolve each year through national conventions and other network opportunities.

== Mission statement ==
"We strive for the advancement, encouragement, and improvement of the profession for the greater safety of participants in all sports, while creating professional growth through research, education, innovation, commitment, and advancement for all members."

== Certification ==
AEMA Certification is the educational program that gives athletic equipment managers an accepted level of proficiency in the performance of their jobs through the proper recognition of specialized skills, knowledge, and experience in the athletic equipment management field. Scantron Corporation is contracted with the AEMA to develop a Certification Standard for Athletic Equipment Management and a Certification Exam is administered annually for members to take and become Certified Equipment Managers. Through a role delineation process, the following areas of job performance were identified and established for athletic equipment managers to be proficient in: management, administration, and professional development; procurement; accountability; maintenance; fitting and safety.

Certification began in 1991 and is considered the standard for athletic equipment management which continues annually thru the Certification Exam. To maintain certified equipment manager status, each certified member must earn 6.0 CEUs (Continuing Education Units) every three years. This represents 60 contact hours in various forms of educational activities that help in the continuous improvement, development, and growth of the association.

== Leadership and committees ==
Top leadership includes the executive director, associate executive director, president, vice president, national office manager, treasurer, certification chair, and the 9 district directors.

Certification Steering Committee is led by a chairperson and covers the CEC, Education, Exam, and Program Committees.

Other committees are the Exhibits Committee, External Communications Committee, Lifetime Achievement Committee, NOCSAE Committee, Scholarship Committee, and Mentorship & Engagement Committee.

== Districts ==
The AEMA membership is divided into 9 districts that consist of District Directors (who each have a seat on the Executive Board with voting power) plus other leadership positions (such as Treasurer, Secretary, Social Media/Communications, etc.). Each district may host virtual or in-person meetings with workshops offering another way for certified members to earn CEUs.

District 1 -- United States: Connecticut, Maine, Massachusetts, New Hampshire, New Jersey, New York, Rhode Island, Vermont

Canada: Quebec, New Brunswick, Newfoundland, Nova Scotia

District 2 -- United States: Delaware, District of Columbia, Maryland, Pennsylvania, Virginia, West Virginia

District 3 -- United States: Alabama, Georgia, Florida, North Carolina, South Carolina

District 4 -- United States: Arkansas, Kentucky, Louisiana, Mississippi, Tennessee

District 5 -- United States: Illinois, Indiana, Michigan, Minnesota, Ohio, Wisconsin

Canada: Ontario

District 6 -- United States: Iowa, Kansas, Missouri, Nebraska, North Dakota, South Dakota

Canada: Manitoba

District 7 -- United States: Colorado, New Mexico, Oklahoma, Texas

District 8 -- United States: Idaho, Montana, Oregon, Utah, Washington, Wyoming

Canada: Alberta, British Columbia, Saskatchewan

District 9 -- United States: Alaska, Arizona, California, Hawaii, Nevada

Germany

Japan

== Awards ==
=== Glenn Sharp Award ===
The Glenn Sharp Award is the most prestigious award that the AEMA gives out each year at convention. It is given to the member who has made the most significant beneficial contributions to the AEMA. Candidates are nominated from each District then reviewed by the Board of Directors and past award winners before the three finalists are voted by all active AEMA members.

Year	Winner
1978	Glenn Sharp
1979	Bobby Yarborough
1980	John Philips
1981	Billy Pickard
1982	John Daggett
1983	Booker Kilgore
1984	Norm Perez
1985	Jim Roberts
1986	Michael Arellano
1987	Bill Kelly
1988	Don Lacross
1989	Gary Boevers
1990	Jeff Boss
1991	Mary O'Leary
1992	Dale Strauf
1993	Ken Hart
1994	Terry Schlatter
1995	Mike Hill
1996	Alan Ansell
1997	Mike Searls
1998	Steve Bartel
1999	Dorothy Cutting
2000	Dino Dennis
2001	Jon Falk
2002	Andy Dixon
2003	Daniel Siermine
2004	Mike Royster
2005	Kelly Jones
2006	John Stone
2007	Tex Ritter
2008	Meli Resendiz
2009	Lynn Williams
2010	Matt Lewis
2011	Kris Young
2012	Clifton Perry
2013	Greg Morgenthaler
2014	Larry Hare
2015	Scott Jess
2016	Matt Althoff
2017	Troy Jepsen
2018	Ron Ohringer
2019	Kerry Conner, Jr.
2020	Robin Wert-Eller
2021	AEMA Membership
2022	Mackenzie Rivers
2023	Phil Junis
2024	Al Cerbe
2025	Scott McDowell
2026	Paige Shinberg

=== Lifetime Achievement Award ===
The Lifetime Achievement Award is an honor given to individuals who have shown exceptional dedication to the AEMA by serving 15 or more years as a member and have distinguished themselves in the promotion and advancement of the association.

Year	Winner
2003	Helen and Glenn Sharp
2004	Jeff Boss
2005	Jon Falk and Dale Strauf
2006	Al Oldenburg
2007	Mary O'Leary
2008	Chick Napolitano and Billy Pickard
2009	Gary Barfield
2014	Ken Hart, Bill Jarvis, Bob Knickerbokcer, and Tex Ritter
2016	William "Billy" Rice, Daryl Buente, and Dorothy Cutting
2017	William John Brick and David "Sarge" Tinga
2018	Douglas Pads and Sports (Rogers, Doug, and Jeff Douglas)
2019	Texon (Wayne Kotulic, Sr. and Wayne Kotulic, Jr.) and Greg Payne
2022	Alan Ansell, Marty Clark, Kelly Jones, Suzette Madej, and Mike Royster
2024	Robert Jones, Chris Matlock, and Greg Morgenthaler
2025	Sam Trusner
2026	Dan Siermine

=== Booker Kilgore Award ===
The Booker Kilgore Award is presented to the high school equipment manager who best exemplifies the character and service of the legendary Booker Kilgore.

Year	Winner
1999	Randy Fogle
2000	Jim Fagan
2001	Chick Napolitano
2002	Vern Walck
2003	Dick Kemper
2004	Dave Rangel
2005	Jim Conant
2006	Jason Eisenhour
2007	Ed Hill
2008	Art Rosales
2009	James Paradise
2010	Jess Jimenez
2011	Rocky Sherman
2012	Norman Walker Jr.
2013	Stephen G. Spada
2016	Dr. Gerard Giuricich
2022	Ron Turner
2023	Fred Brussel
2024	Paul Miller
2025	Danielle Costantino
2026	Justin Whittaker

=== Additional Awards ===
A special recognition Service Award may be given to any member or non-member who has performed a service deemed above and beyond for the AEMA.

Each District is allowed to give out their own awards on an annual basis.
