= Basketball uniform =

Type of uniform worn by basketball players

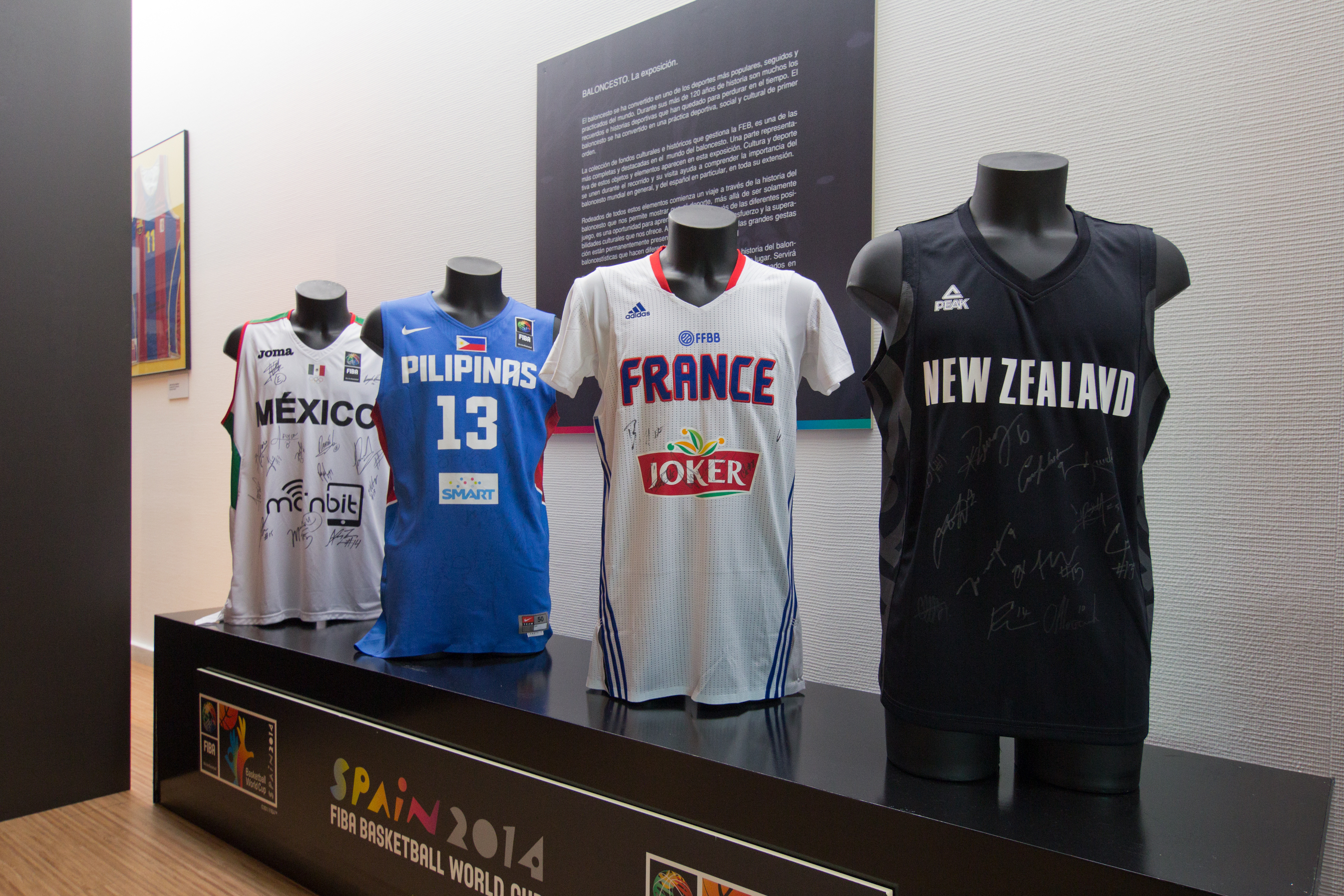
Some national team uniforms at the FIBA Hall of Fame

A basketball uniform is a type of uniform worn by basketball players. Basketball uniforms consist of a jersey that features the number and typically the last name of the player on the back, as well as shorts. Within teams, players wear uniforms representing the team colors; the home team usually wears a lighter-colored uniform, while the visiting team wears a darker-colored uniform.

Different basketball leagues have different specifications for the type of uniform that is allowed on the court. Early in the history of the sport, basketball was played in any type of athletic attire, but by the 1900s, special uniforms were developed and marketed to basketball players. The style, cut, and fit of basketball uniforms evolved throughout subsequent decades, often modeled after the general fashion trends of the day.

== History ==
=== Jerseys and shorts ===
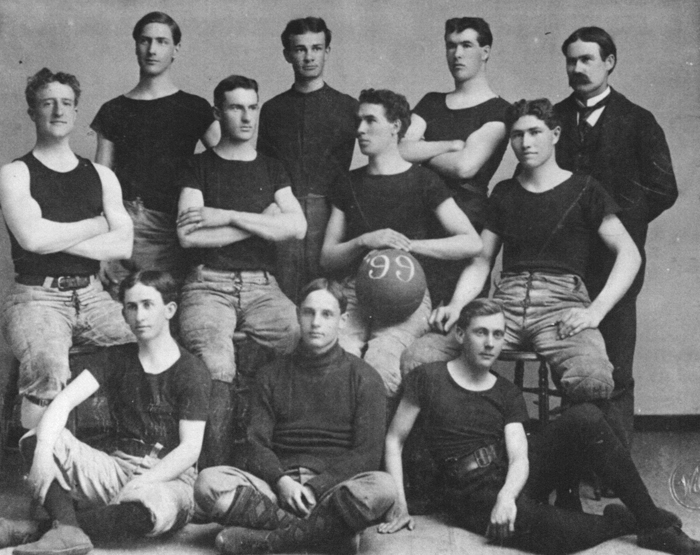
The 1899 University of Kansas basketball team, demonstrating uniforms of sleeveless jerseys and long pants

Originally, basketball was played in any type of athletic attire, ranging from track suits to football uniforms. The first official basketball uniforms, as played in the Spalding catalog of 1901, featured three types of pants: knee-length padded pants, similar to those worn for playing football, as well as shorter pants and knee-length tights. There were two types of suggested jersey, a quarter-length sleeve and a sleeveless version.

The long pants later evolved into medium-length shorts in the 1920s, and by the 1930s, the material used for jerseys changed from heavy wool to the lighter polyester and nylon. In the 1970s and 80s, uniforms became tighter-fitting and shorts were shorter, consistent with the overall fashion trends of these two decades. At this time, women's basketball uniforms transitioned from longer-sleeved uniforms to tank-top style jerseys similar to men's basketball uniforms, which more explicitly showed off players' muscle tone.

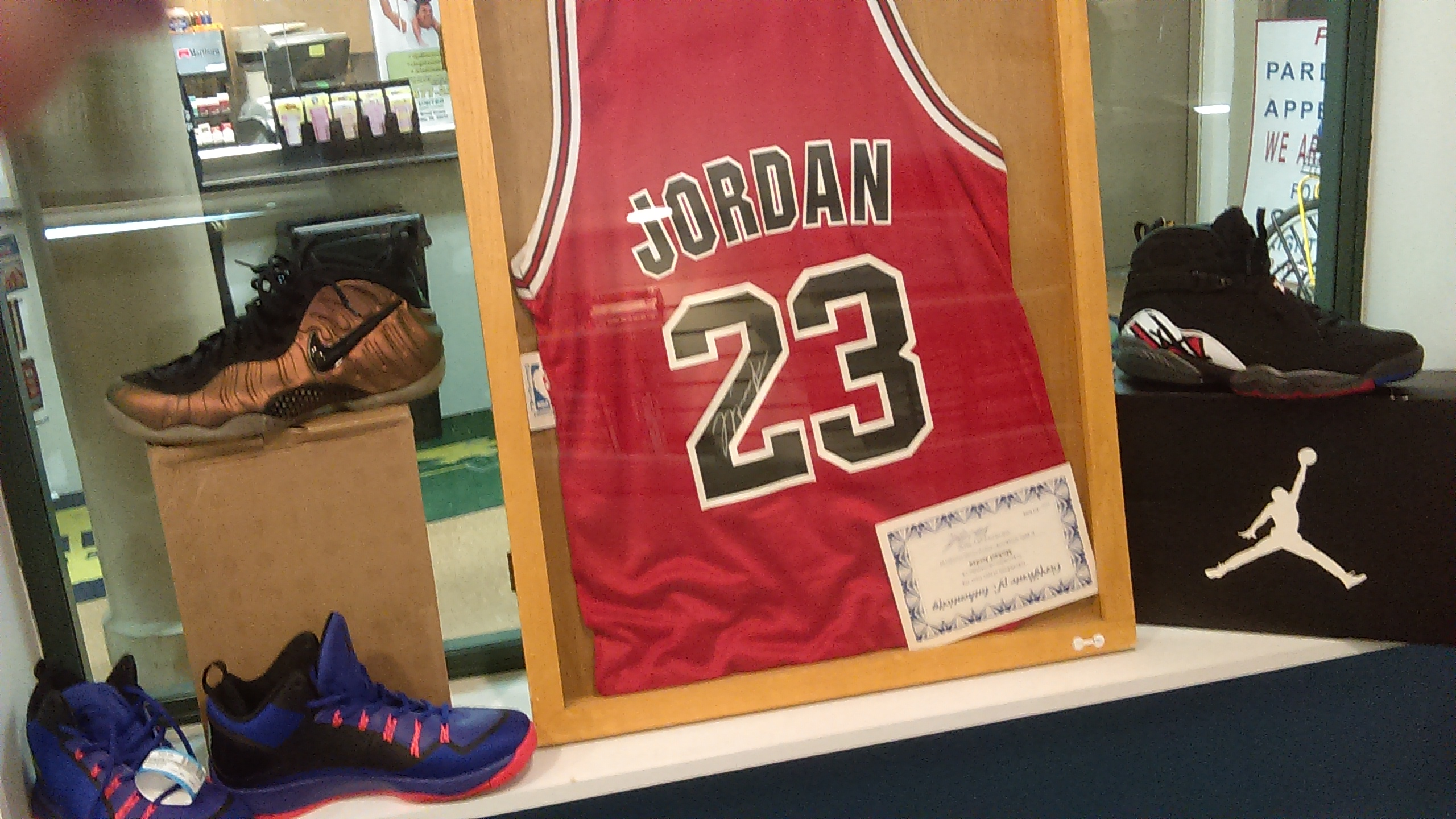
Michael Jordan's jersey and shoes during his tenure on Chicago Bulls

In 1984, Michael Jordan asked for longer shorts and helped popularize the move away from tight, short shorts toward the longer, baggier shorts worn by basketball players today. Throughout the 1990s, basketball uniforms fell under the influence of hip hop culture, with shorts becoming longer and looser-fitting, team colors brighter, and designs more flashy and suggestive of rappers' bling.

At the turn of the 21st century, basketball uniforms became even more oversized and loose-fitting; the arm holes in women's basketball jerseys remained smaller than men's, but were wide enough to reveal the players' sports bras.

==== Sleeved jersey ====
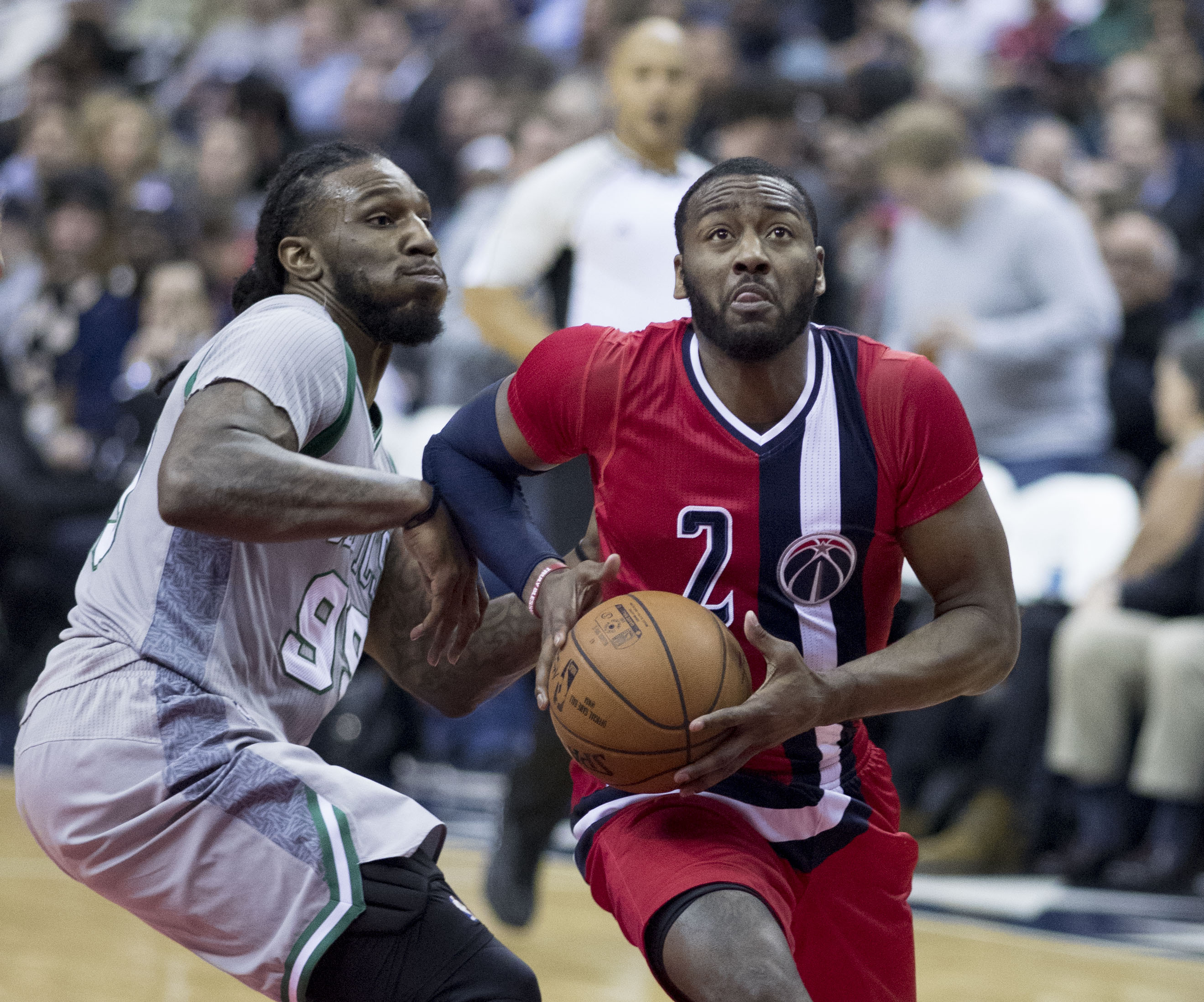
Jae Crowder and John Wall wearing the newly introduced sleeved basketball jerseys

For the Christmas Day games of 2013, the NBA and its apparel partner Adidas introduced a newly designed sleeved jersey with large team and NBA logos on the front. Marketers for the new uniforms realized that fans were unwilling to wear sleeveless jerseys in their day-to-day life and hoped the new sleeved jerseys would be more popular for everyday wear. However, it was also a "not-so-well-kept secret that the NBA wanted to implement jersey ads in the years following the introduction of sleeved jerseys" as the "sleeves allow more space for potential partners to add their corporate logos to jerseys" like association football (soccer). After the league deal with Adidas expired and Nike signed on as the new apparel partner, the sleeved jersey did not continue.

The sleeved jersey was controversial among players. LeBron James famously ripped the sleeves off during a prime time game against the New York Knicks in 2015, but in the 2016 NBA Finals James convinced his teammates to wear the sleeved jerseys in Game 5 and again in the title-clinching Game 7.

=== Shoes ===
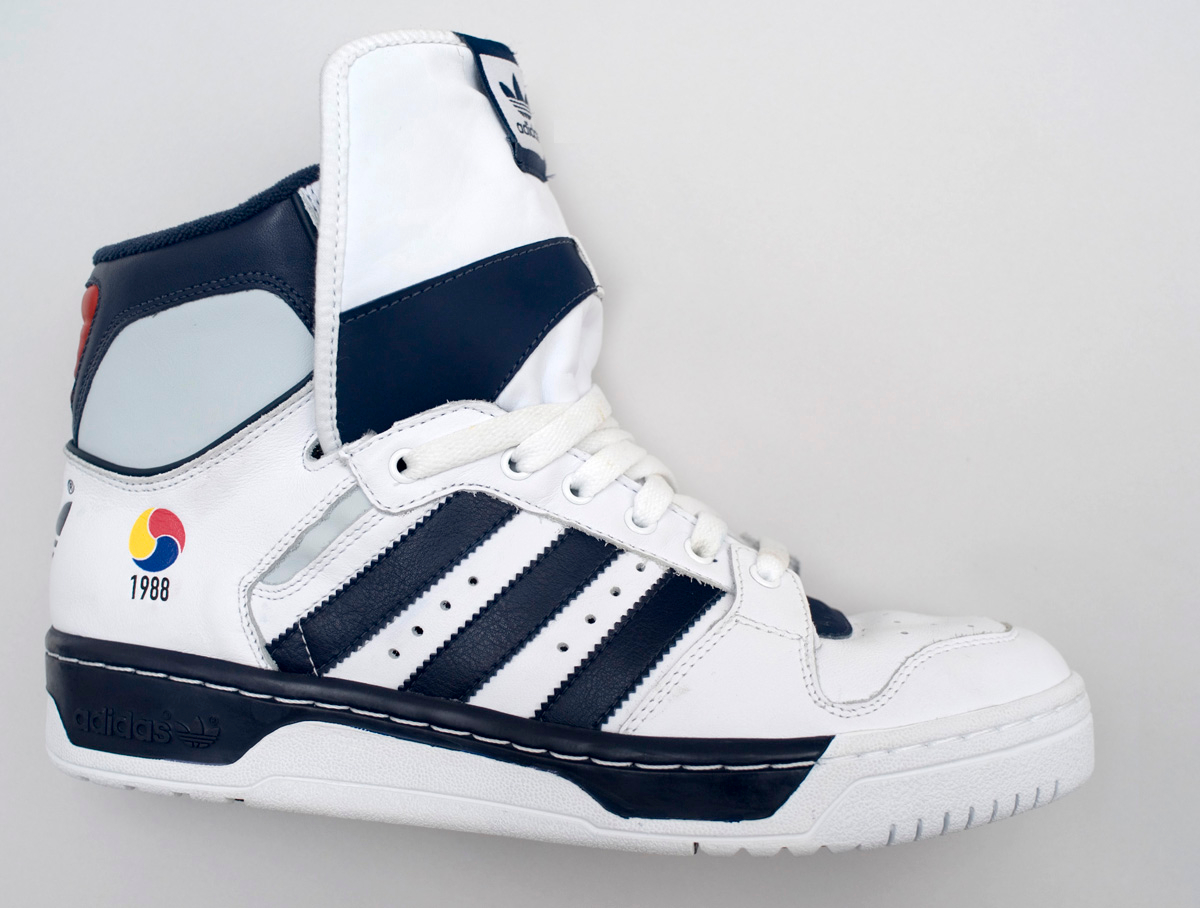
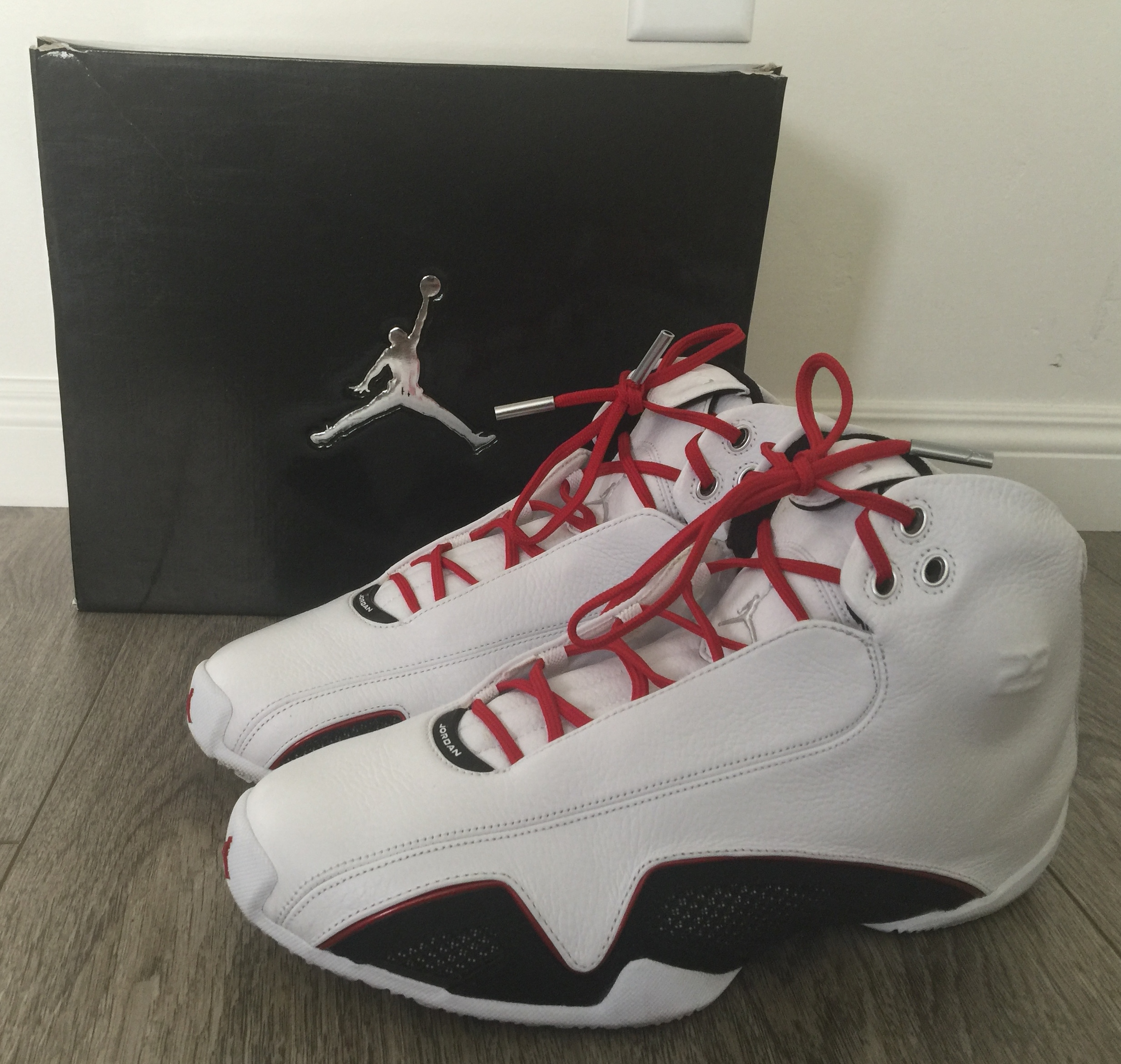
Basketball shoes by Adidas (left) and Nike (right)

In 1903, a special basketball shoe with suction cups to prevent slippage was added to the official basketball uniform demonstrated in the Spalding catalog. Over the decades, different shoe brands and styles were popular as basketball shoes: Chuck Taylor All-Stars and Keds in the 1960s and 1970s; Adidas and Nike leather high-tops in the late 1970s and 1980s; and Air Jordans in the 1990s.

Now most athletes wear shoes from the brand they are signed with and some even have their own signature shoes. The first person to have their own signature shoe was Walt "Clyde" Frazier when he teamed up with Puma in 1973. Other brands that have made signature shoes for players include, Under Armour (with their most popular being with Stephen Curry), Reebok (with their most popular being with Shaquille O'Neal), New Balance(with their most popular being with Kawhi Leonard), and Anta(with their most popular being Klay Thompson).

=== Accessories ===
In the 1970s, Slick Watts and Bill Walton began to wear headbands, which soon became popular with other players. Rick Barry popularized wrist-bands, and other players soon created variations, such as bands that covered their forearms or biceps. These were used to wipe off sweat, or simply worn as fashion statements. In 2001, Allen Iverson popularized the arm sleeve, originally used to help his bursitis in his right elbow. In the early 21st century, many NBA players began quietly wearing tight-fitting thigh and chest pads under their uniforms.

=== Women's ===
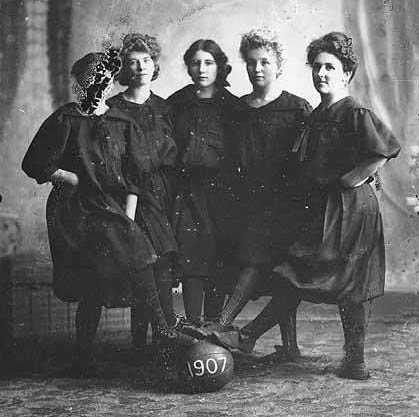
Women's team in 1907 wearing wool skirts

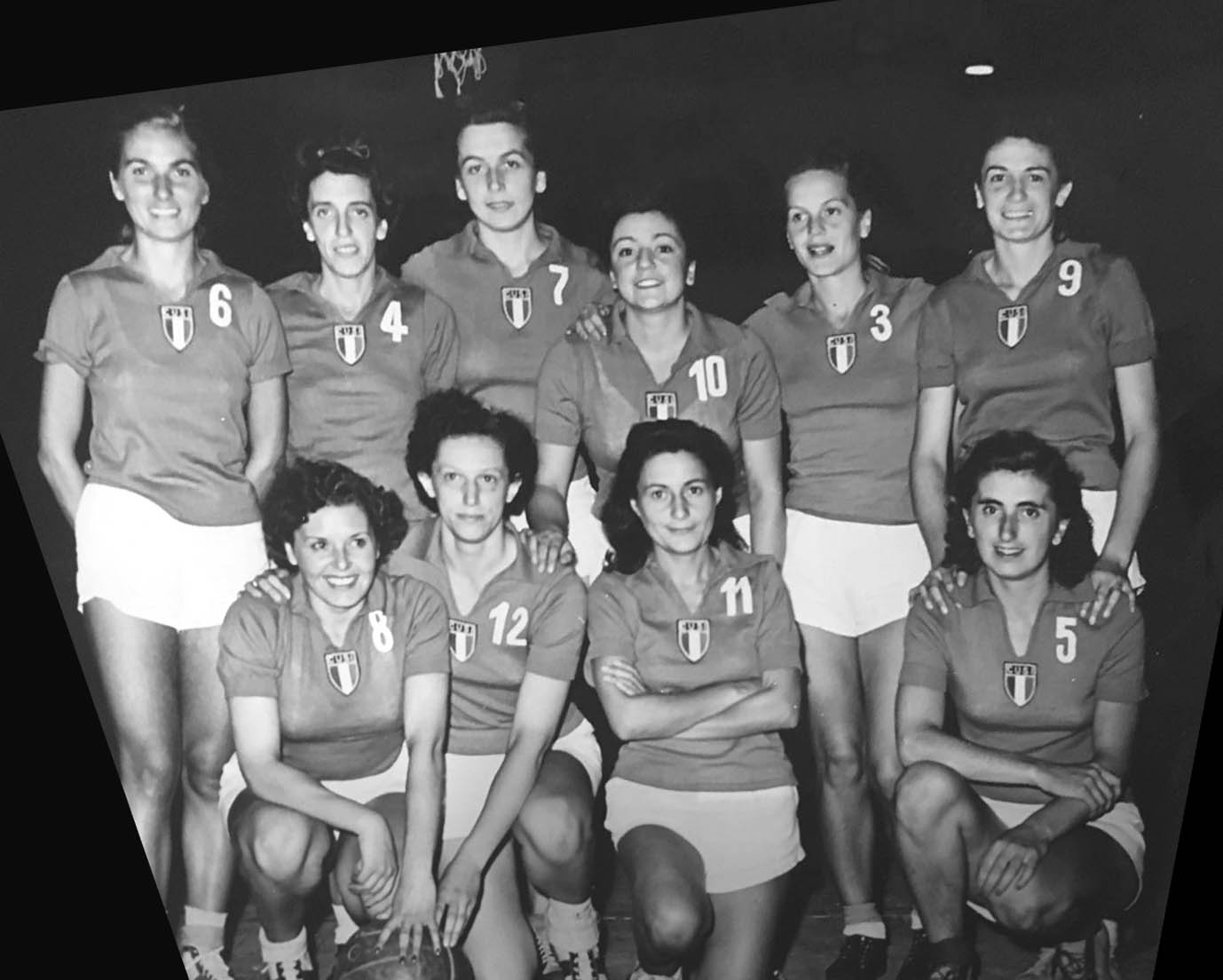
1948 Italian team with the new polyester and nylon uniforms

In the 19th-century what women wore was controlled by men. When they played women wore floor-length wool skirts. In the '20s they introduced a shorter version of the wool-skirts. In the '30s the movement towards baggy button-able shorts. The '40s and '50s were a huge turning point for women's uniform.

As production became cheaper the wool uniforms were replaced by more functional polyester and nylon's. During this time belted satin shorts were also progressively being used.

Going into the '60s the skirts were starting to disappear and shorts with elastic waistbands were introduced. Finally from 1980 till now women's uniform are now similar to men's. As they began to wear loose longline shorts, and skirts were eliminated entirely.

== Modern day ==
=== United States basketball ===
==== Rules and regulations ====
In professional basketball leagues today, teams playing at home typically wear lighter-colored uniforms than the visiting team.

The NBA eliminated "home" and "away" uniform designations prior to the 2017–18 season. Teams' white uniforms were then designated as "Association" uniforms, and their color uniforms were designated as "Icon" uniforms. Teams also unveiled two alternative uniforms, designated as "Statement" and "City" uniforms. Furthermore, the home team is now allowed to wear any uniform color it chooses, while its opponent may wear any color that sufficiently contrasts with the home team's choice.

NBA basketball shorts must fall at least 1 inch above the knee, and T-shirts cannot be worn under the jersey – however, they are permitted in American college basketball. Some NBA and WNBA teams have allowed sponsors' logos to appear on their uniforms.

==== Material ====
Uniforms are made of wicking material designed to absorb sweat and ensure that it evaporates faster. They are the product of a four-year study researching professional basketball players, who identified the need for fewer seams, lighter weight, and faster drying and cooling in their jerseys.

=== International basketball leagues ===
The main difference between U.S. basketball uniforms and those of other countries is the appearance of sponsorship iconography; European basketball uniforms are often covered in the logos of their sponsors (similar to association football), while the U.S. uniforms (like other major U.S. pro sports) feature the team wordmark/logo front and center.

For the 2017–18 season, some U.S. teams have started putting sponsorship logos on their jerseys on the upper left of the jersey which is a maximum of 2.5 inches by 2.5 inches.

=== Women's ===
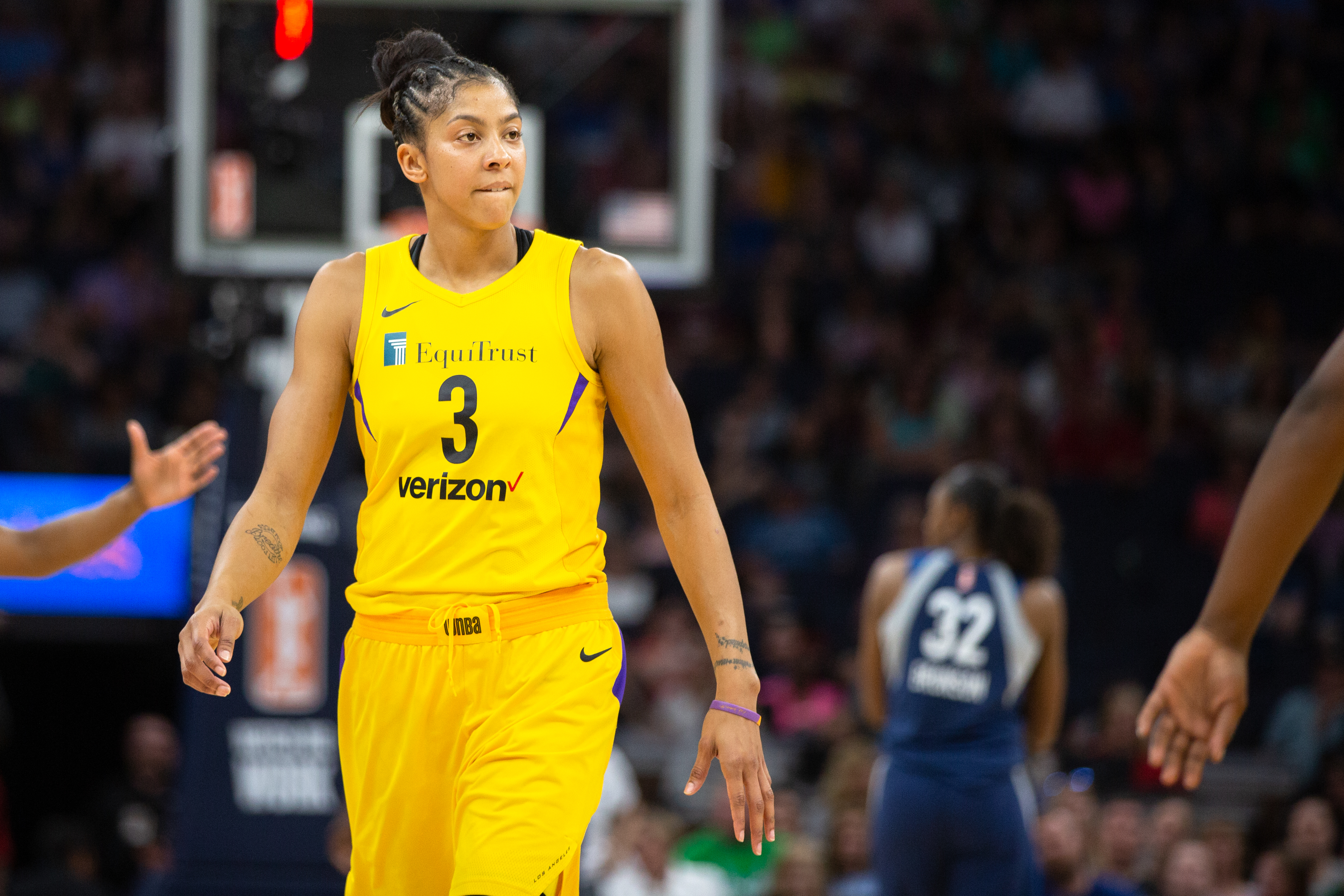
2× WNBA MVP Candace Parker

Women's uniforms today are similar to the men's uniform. It is common now to see Lycra compression shorts, sweat-wicking polyester vests, lightweight jerseys and breathable baggy shorts.

In the WNBA the women are allowed to choose which styles and fabrics best suits them.

== FIBA's Technical Specifications ==
All team members must adhere to the following uniform standards:

=== Shirts ===
- Must be the same dominant color on both the front and back, matching the shorts.
- Sleeves, if present, must end above the elbow. Long sleeves are prohibited.
- Shirts must be tucked into the playing shorts at all times.
- "All-in-one" uniforms are allowed.

=== Shorts ===
- Must be the same dominant color on both the front and back, matching the shirts.
- Must end above the knee.

=== Socks ===
- All team members must wear socks of the same dominant color.
- Socks must remain clearly visible during play.

=== Numbering Specifications ===
Each player’s shirt must display plain, contrasting numbers on the front and back, meeting the following criteria:

- Back numbers: Minimum height of 16 centimetres (6.3 in)
- Front numbers: Minimum height of 6 centimetres (2.4 in)
- Number width: At least 2 centimetres (0.79 in)
- Permitted numbers: 0, 00, or any number from 1 to 99.
- Unique numbering: No two players on the same team may wear identical numbers.
- Advertising/logos: Must maintain a minimum distance of 4 centimetres (1.6 in) from the numbers.

=== Additional Uniform Regulations ===
- Teams must possess at least two sets of shirts.
- The home team (first listed in the schedule) shall wear light-colored shirts, preferably white.
- The visiting team (second listed in the schedule) shall wear dark-colored shirts.
- Teams may mutually agree to switch shirt colors if desired.

=== Referee and Table Officials Uniform ===
Referees and table officials must wear the following:

- Officially designated referees’ shirt.
- Long black trousers.
- Black socks.
- Black basketball shoes.

== NBA's Technical Specifications ==
=== Jersey Design ===
- Numbers must be displayed on the front and back, contrasting with the jersey color.

==== Minimum dimensions ====
- Front number: 0.75 inches (19 mm) width, 4 inches (100 mm) height
- Back number: 0.75 inches (19 mm) width, 6 inches (150 mm) height
- Player surnames must be on the back, at least 2.5 inches (64 mm) tall.
- Some exceptions may apply for special events.

=== Team Colors ===
- Home team wears light-colored jerseys.
- Away team wears dark-colored jerseys.
- In neutral games or doubleheaders, the second team listed acts as the home team.

=== Pre-Game & Bench Attire ===
- Players must be uniformly dressed during introductions.
- Non-uniformed players (active or inactive) must wear clean, professional attire (team-issued or dress code-compliant).
- Not allowed on the bench: Athleisure (sweatpants, joggers, etc.), unless it’s approved team apparel.

=== In-Game Rules ===
- Jerseys must remain tucked in during play.
- No T-shirts allowed under uniforms.
- Only shoes may display commercial logos.

=== Basketball Game Officials ===
A standard basketball game is typically officiated by the following roles:

- Crew Chief: The lead official responsible for final decisions.
- Referee: Assists in enforcing rules and game flow.
- Umpire: Works alongside the referee to monitor gameplay.
- Replay Center Official: Reviews video footage for challenged calls.

These officials wear uniforms designated by the league.

== See also ==
- Sportswear (activewear)

== Bibliography ==
- FIBA (Fédération Internationale de Basketball Amateur). 2024. Official Basketball Rules 2024: Basketball Rules. Approved by FIBA Central Board. PDF.
- NBA (National Basketball Association). 2024. 2024–25 Official NBA Playing Rules. PDF.
