= Kickoff (gridiron football) =

Method of starting a drive in gridiron football

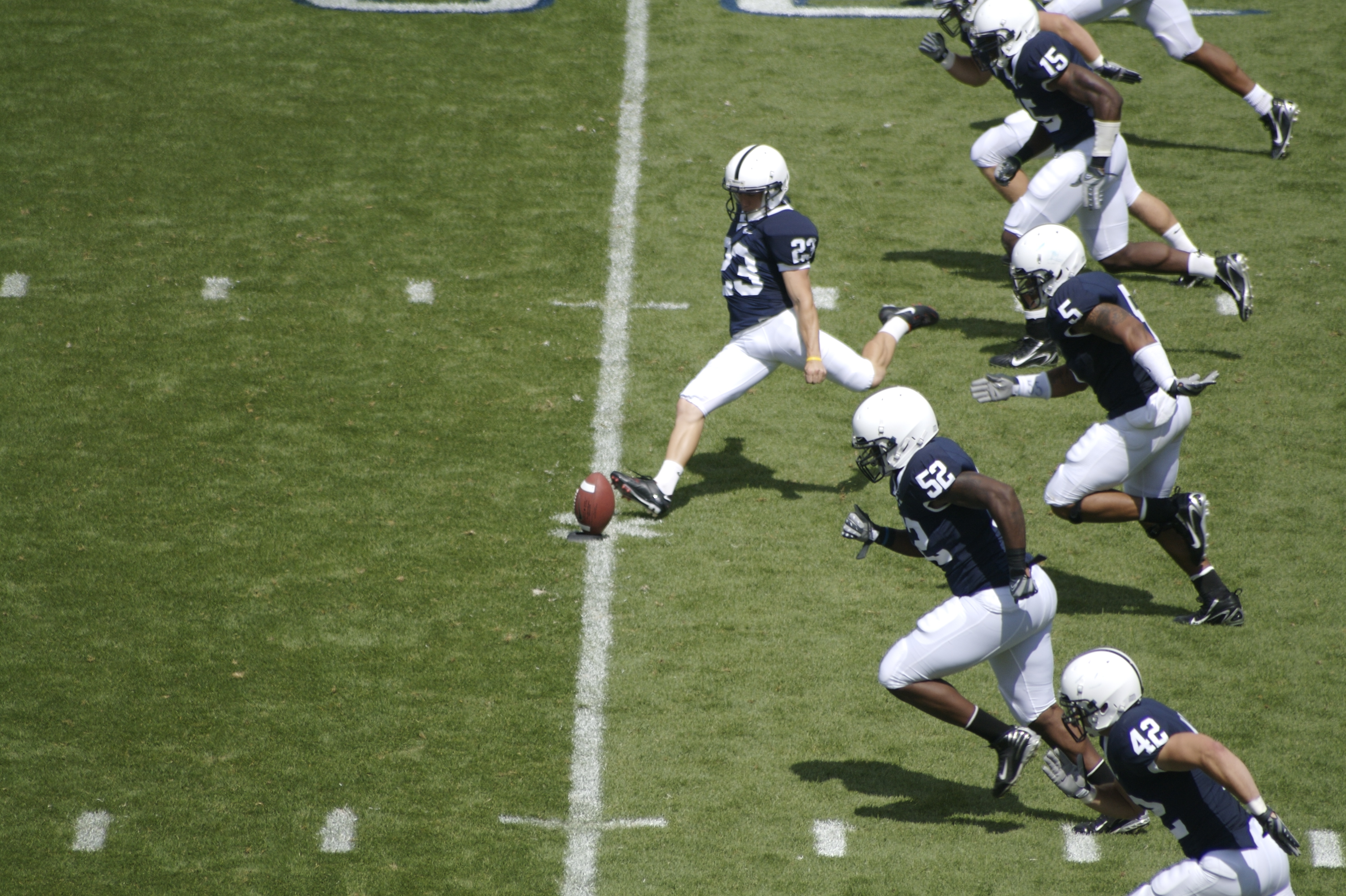
Kevin Kelly and the 2007 Penn State Nittany Lions football team kicks the ball off after scoring a touchdown in their season opening game

A kickoff is a method of starting a drive in gridiron football. Additionally, it may refer to a kickoff time, the scheduled time of the first kickoff of a game. Typically, a kickoff consists of one team – the "kicking team" – kicking the ball to the opposing team – the "receiving team". The receiving team is then entitled to return the ball, i.e., attempt to advance it towards the kicking team's end zone, until the player with the ball is tackled by the kicking team, goes out of bounds, scores a touchdown, or the play is otherwise ruled dead. Kickoffs take place at the start of each half of play, the beginning of overtime in some overtime formats, and after scoring plays. Normally, the kicking team hopes to kick the ball as far down the field as possible in order to maximize the distance the team returning the kick must advance in order to score.

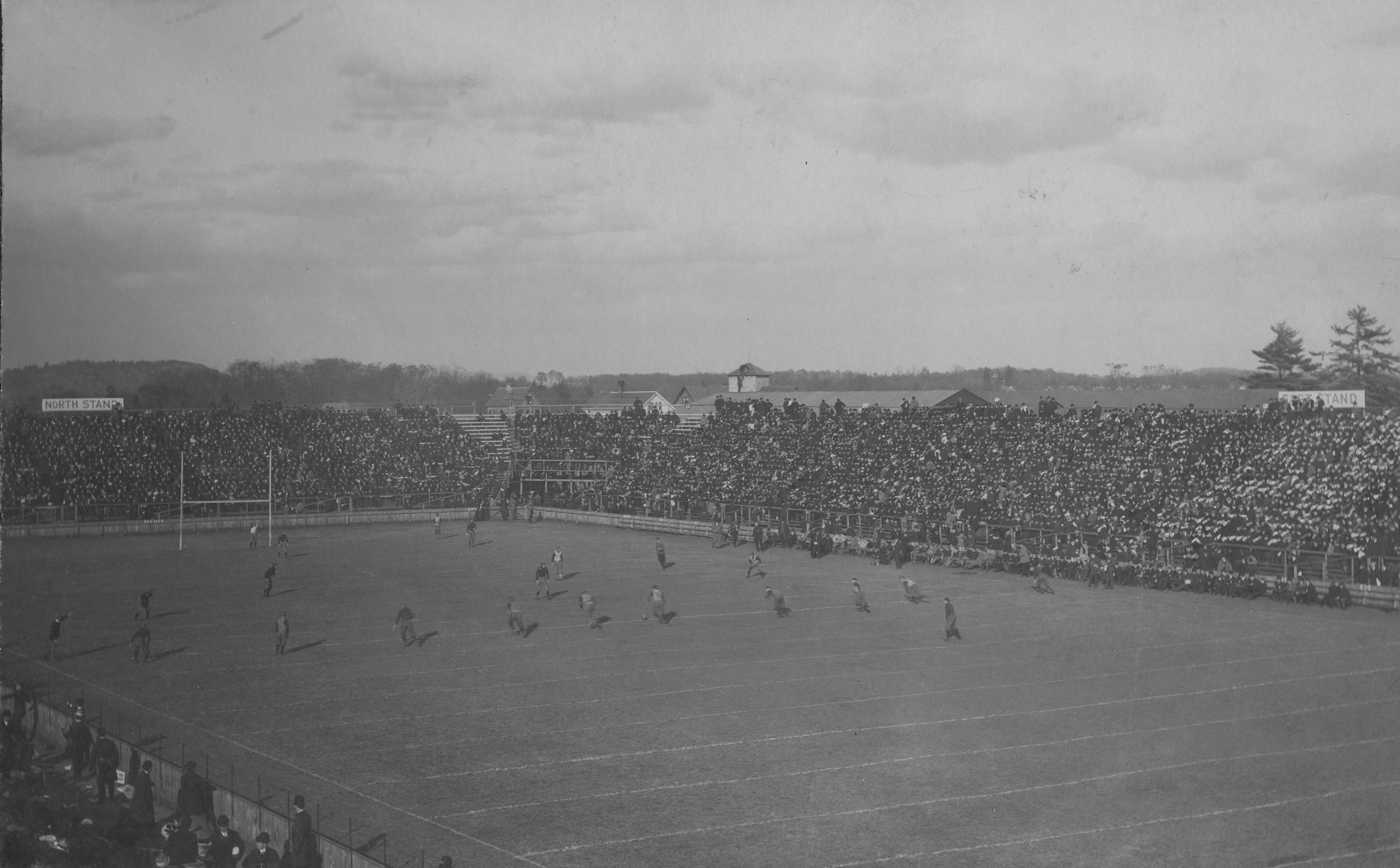
Kickoff of the Princeton–Yale football game in 1901.

Common variants on the typical kickoff format include the onside kick, in which the kicking team attempts to regain possession of the ball by kicking it a short distance; a touchback, which may occur if the ball is kicked into the receiving team's end zone; or a fair catch, in which a player on the receiving team asks to catch the ball without interference from the kicking team, waiving his entitlement to attempt a return rush. Additionally, penalties exist for various infractions such as a player violating his position restrictions prior to the kick (5-yard penalty), or if the ball goes out of bounds before touching a player (25 yards past the spot of the kick or placed at the spot the ball left the field of play, whichever is more advantageous to the receiving team).

== Award ==
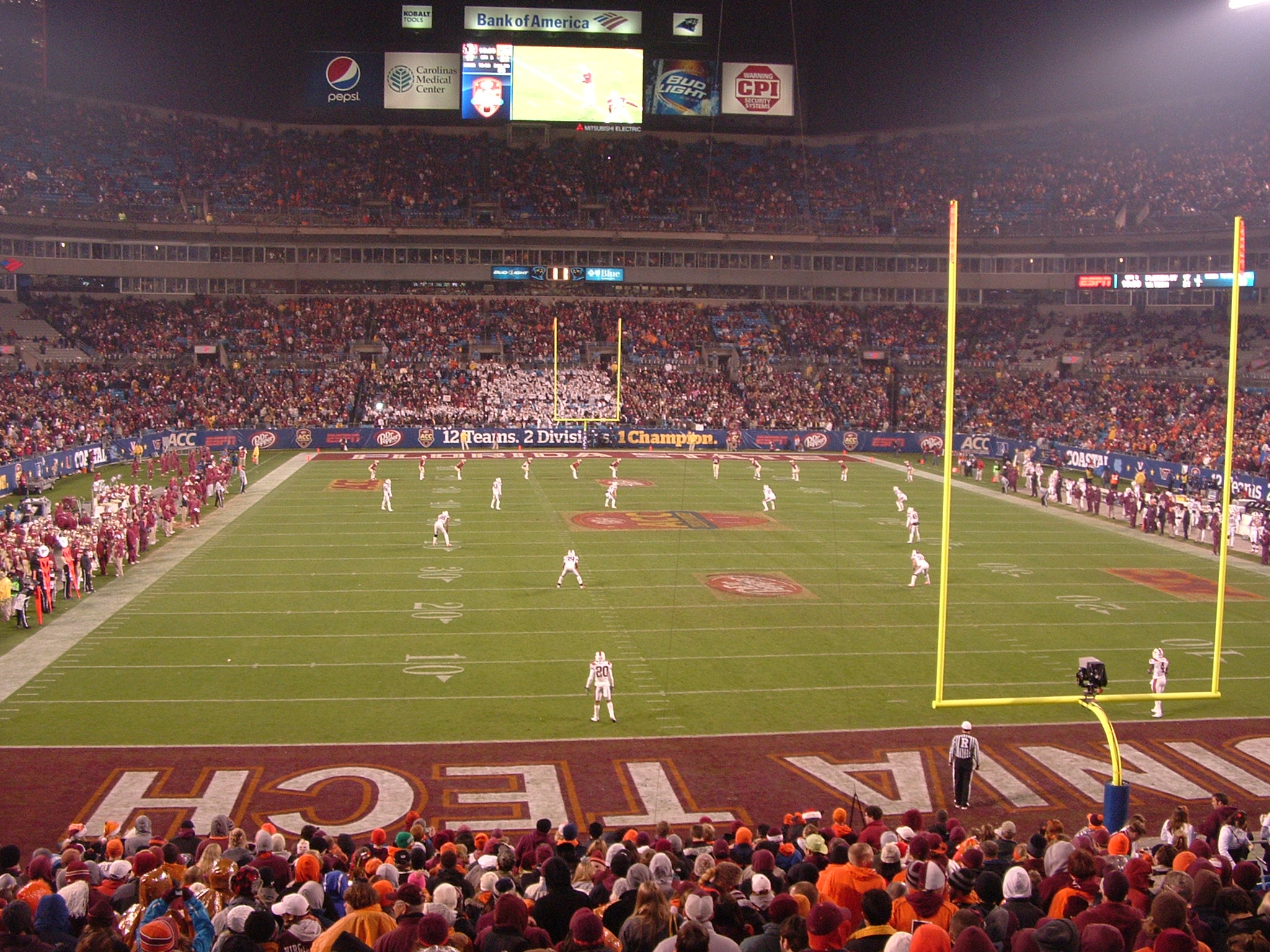
End zone view of a kickoff about to occur. The Florida State Seminoles, in garnet jerseys, at the far side of the field are about to kick to the Virginia Tech Hokies in white jerseys, in the foreground.

A kickoff occurs at the start of each half and before the first overtime (in the National Football League and Arena Football League). It is also traditionally decided by a coin toss at the beginning of each game carried out by the referee. The visiting team captain calls either heads or tails. The winner of the coin toss elects whether to take first choice in the first half or the second half. The captain with first choice then picks either a team to kick off or an end of the field to defend. The other captain chooses the remaining option. At the beginning of the second half, the two captains choose in the reverse order. If an overtime is required, another coin toss takes place to decide who gets first possession during the overtime. After a touchdown the scoring team kicks the ball off to the opposing team. In American football a field goal also results in a kickoff by the scoring team, but in Canadian football the scored-against team has an option of scrimmaging from their 35-yard line or receiving a kickoff. An exception to the Canadian rule applies in U Sports competition; if a team scores a field goal on a play that began after the three-minute warning in the fourth quarter, a kickoff is mandatory, with the scoring team kicking off from the standard position of its own 45-yard line.

After a safety in Canadian football, the scored-against kicks off. In American football, a kickoff is an option, but most teams choose to punt the ball on the free kick; the National Football League, in contrast to most other leagues, prohibits the use of a kicking tee on a safety free kick.

== Procedure ==
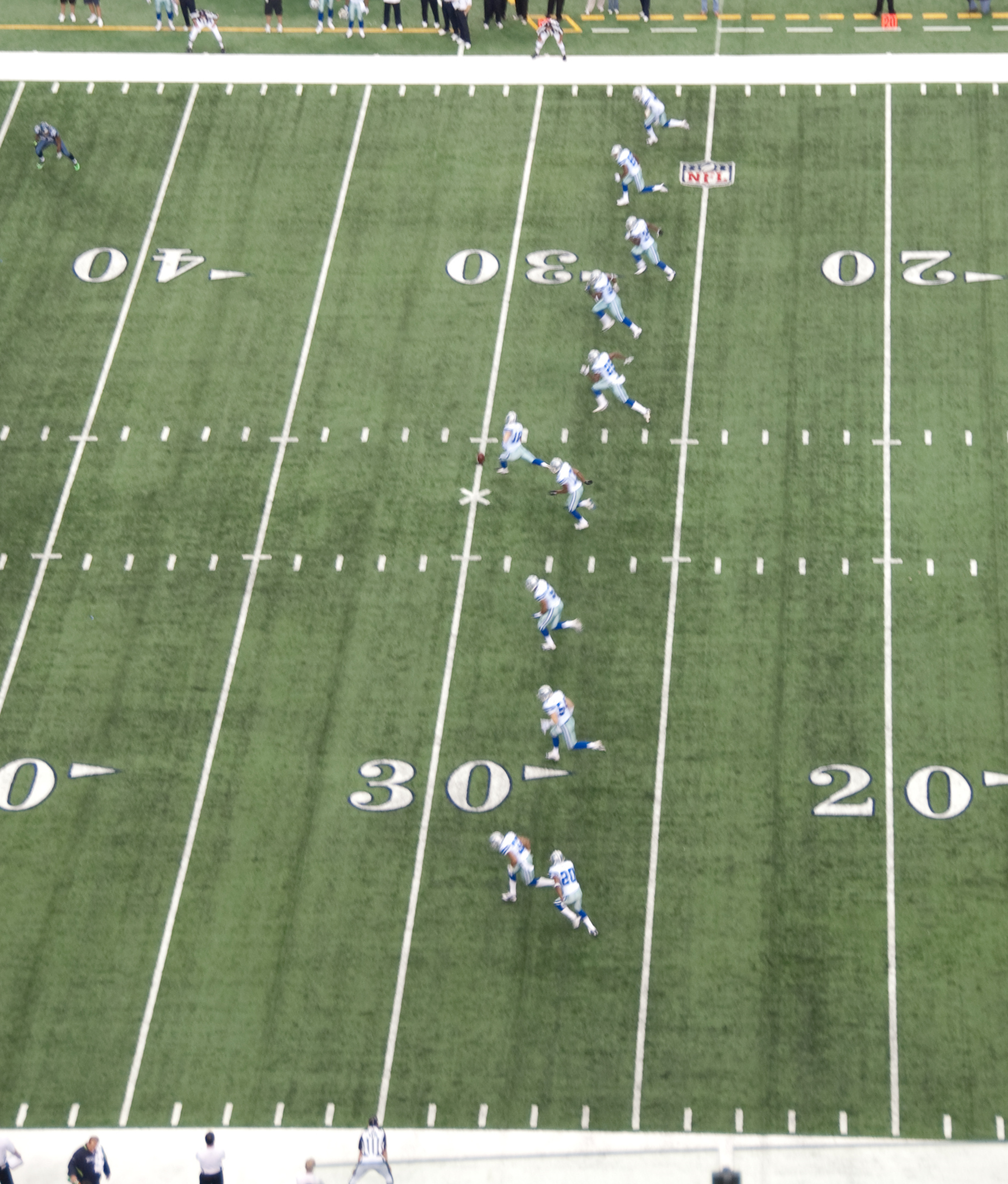
Dallas Cowboys kick-off during an NFL game. This picture was taken when the NFL kicked off from the 30-yard line, as it did from 1994 to 2010.

The line where the ball is placed for kickoff varies among the rule books. It is placed on the kicking team's 20-yard line in the current UFL (inherited from the second USFL), the 30-yard line in six-man football and the now-defunct second XFL, 35-yard line in college and the NFL, 40-yard line in American high school football, (Note: Although the two main governing bodies for Texas high school sports, the University Interscholastic League (mainly public schools) and the Texas Association of Private and Parochial Schools, base their football tules on the NCAA set, both bodies use the 40-yard line as their kickoff spot.) on the 45-yard line in amateur Canadian football, and the goal line in indoor and arena football. For the 2016 season only, the Ivy League placed the ball on the 40-yard line in conference games. All players on the kicking team except the kicker (and, if used, a holder) must not cross the line at which the ball is placed until the ball is kicked. The receiving team must stay behind the line that is 10 yards from where the ball is placed. The ball can be fielded by the receiving team at any point after it has been kicked, or by the kicking team after it has traveled 10 yards or has been touched by a member of the receiving team. In American football (but not Canadian) touchback and fair catch rules apply to the kicked ball. If it is fielded by the kicking team, it is called an onside kick. A low, bouncing kick is called a squib kick. Although a squib kick typically gives the receiving team better field position than they would if a normal kick had been used, a squib kick is sometimes used to avoid giving up a long return, as well as use up a valuable amount of time on the clock, as it is impossible to fair catch such a kick. It is usually done when a team takes the lead in the final seconds, and is done to safely run out the remainder of the clock. Squib kicking with more than 20 seconds remaining has had unfortunate results (a line drive kick is more common when there are 20 to 50 seconds remaining; the typical hurry-up offense drive takes over a minute), but has been done by some teams.

The second XFL used a unique kickoff procedure. Kickoffs took place from the kicking team's 30-yard line, as opposed to the 35-yard line in the NFL. The positioning of players was dramatically different from that in any previous outdoor football league. All players on both teams, except the kicker and a single returner, were required to line up directly across from each other, with the kicking team on the receiving team's 35 and the receiving team on its own 30. On each side of the ball, each team had to have at least two players lined up between the outside of the yard markers and the sideline, and at least two players between the inside of the yard marker and the hashmarks. All players except the kicker and returner had to remain stationary, with both feet on the ground and at least one on the team's appropriate yard line, until the returner caught the ball, or the ball was on the ground for 3 seconds. Touchbacks were spotted at the receiving team's 35-yard line. The XFL also had severe penalties for kicks that went out of bounds, or fell short of the receiving team's 20-yard line. Onside kicks were allowed, using more conventional outdoor football rules, but the referee had to be informed before such a kick could be attempted and had to touch the ground within 20 yards of the spot of the kick (thus, the onside kick rule could be used to execute a squib kick).

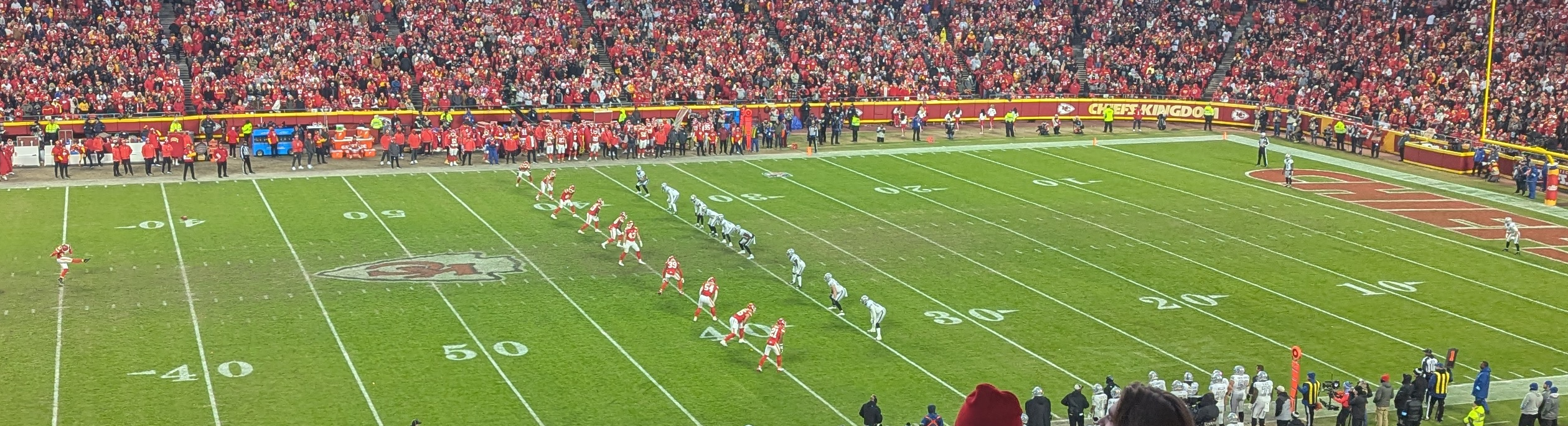
Kansas City Chiefs kicker Matthew Wright (left) kicks off to the Las Vegas Raiders on November 29, 2024, under the 2024 kickoff rules

=== Dynamic kickoff ===
In 2024, the NFL adopted a new kickoff procedure very similar to that used by the second XFL, called the "dynamic kickoff". The kickoff point remains at the kicking team's 35-yard line, but all players on the kicking team apart from the kicker line up at the receiving team's 40. At least nine members of the receiving team must line up in a "setup zone" between their own 30- and 35-yard lines, and one or two returners are allowed in the "landing zone" between the goal line and the 20. In a slight variation from the XFL procedure, all players except the kicker and returners are prohibited from moving before the ball hits the ground or touches a player within the landing zone. Touchbacks are spotted at the receiving team's 30, and fair catches are prohibited. Onside kicks, using the traditional formation, are allowed only in the fourth quarter and in overtime, but the kicking team must inform the game officials of its intent to do so. This change was adopted for the 2024 season only, allowing for possible tweaks over time. In 2025, the new kickoff rules were made permanent. Touchbacks were also moved to the 35-yard line and onside kicks can now be declared any time in the game if a team is losing.

== Penalties ==
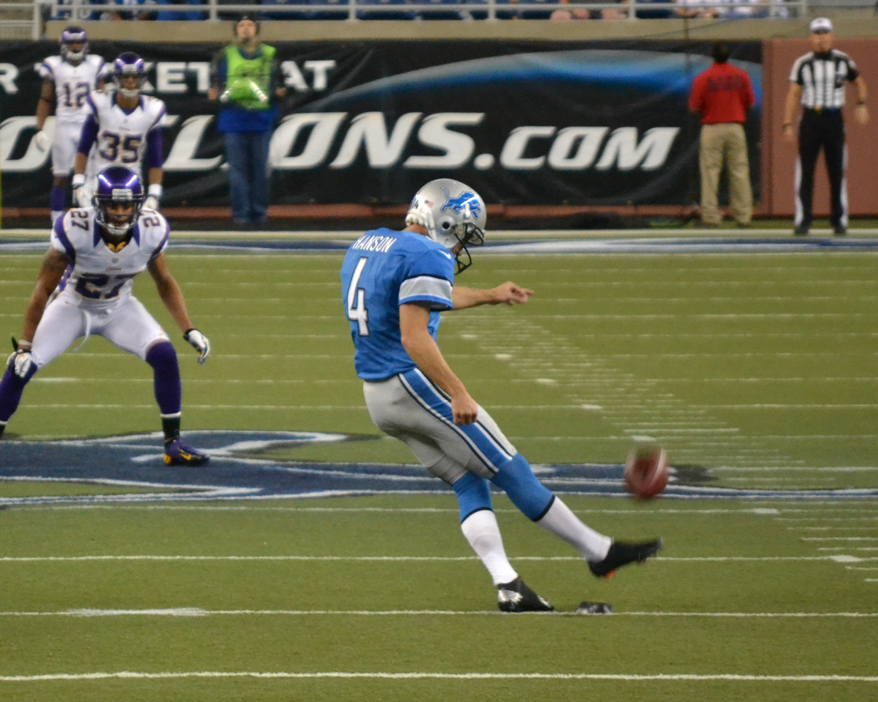
Jason Hanson of the Detroit Lions kicks off against the Minnesota Vikings in 2012

If a receiving player crosses his restraining line before the kick, the ball is to be advanced 5 yards, then re-kicked. If a kicking team player crosses the line at which the ball is placed before it is kicked, the receiving team has the option either to have the kicking team re-kick from 5 yards farther back, or have 5 yards added on to the end of the return. In high school football, the receiving team only has the option to make the kicking team re-kick.

If the ball goes out of bounds without being touched by a player, the receiving team can choose either to have the ball moved back 5 yards and re-kicked, to take the ball 25 yards (30 yards under NCAA rules; 25 yards under National Federation high school rules) past the spot of the kick (usually at their own 35-yard line), or to take the ball where it went out of bounds. On an onside kick, if the ball does not travel ten yards before the kicking team recovers the ball, they will take a 5-yard penalty and have the chance to kick another onside kick. If the onside kick goes less than 10 yards again, the receiving team will receive the ball at the spot the kicking team recovered it. However, if the receiving team touches the ball before it goes 10 yards, either team can recover it unpenalized.

The XFL had distinctive penalties for kicks that went out of bounds, failed to reach the receiving team's 20-yard line in flight, or returned behind the 20 after touching the ground past it. For a kick that went out of bounds, the receiving team could take possession either at the spot where the ball went out of bounds, or at the kicking team's 45-yard line. On kicks that failed to reach the 20, or return to the area between the 20 and the kicking team, the ball was immediately whistled dead and the receiving team received possession at the kicking team's 45. The USFL had a similarly severe penalty for kicks that go out of bounds; the receiving team could take possession at the spot where the ball went out of bounds, or at the 50-yard line. The current UFL adopted the USFL's penalty rule.

== Kickoff into end zone ==
Kickoffs entering the end zone are handled differently in American and Canadian rules. In American college and professional games, as well as Texas high school football, if the ball goes out of bounds in the receiving team's end zone or is recovered and downed in the receiving team's end zone without advancing past it, the ball is placed at the receiving team's 25-yard line, and possession is given to the receiving team; these are known as touchbacks. High school football (apart from Texas) immediately rules the ball dead when the ball crosses the goal line; the ball cannot be returned from the end zone, nor can it be recovered there for a touchdown. NFL immediately rules the ball dead, when the ball touches the ground in the endzone, if not been touched by the receivers before. In the Canadian game if the ball goes into the end zone and then out of bounds without being touched, the receiving team scrimmages from the 25-yard line (no points are scored). If the receiving team gains possession of a kickoff in its own end zone and then fails to return it into the field of play, the kicking team scores one point, and the receiving team scrimmages from the 35-yard line. If the kicking team gains possession in the end zone, they score a touchdown. Various forms of indoor football also recognize the single, but the ball must not only cross the end zone but pass through the uprights (as in a field goal) as well. If the kicking team recovers its own kickoff in the end zone in any version of the game (something that, as previously mentioned, is impossible in high school football outside of Texas), it scores a touchdown.

Kickoffs into the end zone resulting in touchbacks became much more common in the NFL in 2011 as a result of a rule change. Whereas the kicking team previously kicked the ball off from their 30-yard line, the NFL moved the spot of the kickoff up 5 yards before the 2011 season in an attempt to avoid injuries from high-speed collisions. Only 16 percent of kickoffs in the 2010 season were touchbacks, but that jumped to almost 44 percent after the rule change. In the 2024 season, corresponding with the NFL's dramatic change to kickoff procedures, touchbacks on kickoffs will be spotted at the receiving team's 30-yard line.

In the second XFL, the standard spot for a touchback was the receiving team's 35-yard line. However, if a kickoff or free kick after a safety first bounced outside the end zone and was then downed by the receiving team in its end zone, the ball was spotted on the receiving team's 15 instead of the 35.

== Return ==
A video of a kickoff and return, played between the Baker Wildcats and Benedictine Ravens at Arrowhead Stadium, Kansas City, Missouri in 2014.

Under standard rules (i.e., those in leagues other than the NFL), to receive a kickoff and set up a kick return, the receiving team sets up its players starting from 10 yards back from the point the ball is kicked from. There are usually one or two players positioned deep (around the goal line) that will attempt to catch or pick up the ball after it is kicked off by the opposing team's kicker. They will then attempt to carry the ball as far as possible upfield, without being tackled or running out of bounds. The other players are to back the kickoff team from getting to their kick returner.

== Alternatives ==
In certain leagues consisting of younger players, and in the short-lived professional Alliance of American Football, there are no kickoffs. Teams are automatically awarded the ball at a certain spot on the field. In the AAF, this spot was the 25-yard line of the team receiving possession.

== History in the NFL ==
In 1974, the kickoff was moved five yards back from the 40-yard line to the 35-yard line in order to create more exciting returns. Kickoff returns increased from 75% to 92%. In 1994, after only 68% of kicks were returned the prior year, the kickoff was moved to the 30-yard line. This increased returns to 88% during the 1994 season.

In 2009, due to injury concerns, the NFL banned three or more blockers from linking together and forming a wedge on kickoff returns. In 2011, kickoffs into the end zone resulting in touchbacks became much more common after the kickoff was moved to the 35-yard line in an attempt to avoid injuries from high-speed collisions. Only 16 percent of kickoffs in the 2010 season were touchbacks, but that jumped to almost 44 percent after the rule change. Concussions on kickoffs reportedly dropped by 40% in 2011 but the return rate fell from 80% to 50%. The average number of kickoff returns per team was 64 in 2010 as opposed to only 43 in 2011. The percent of kickoff returns continued to decrease over time. In 2016, touchbacks were moved from the 20-yard line to the 25-yard line, further incentivizing teams to not return kickoffs. In 2023, the average number of kickoff returns per team for the whole season was only 18.

In 2024, the NFL implemented new rule changes to increase kickoff returns while also maintaining heightened player safety, called the "dynamic kickoff". However, these new rule changes only increased the average number of kickoff returns per team to 29. In 2025, the NFL made the dynamic kickoff permanent and modified it some more. Touchbacks were moved to the 35-yard line, incentivizing kickers to avoid touchbacks and causing the average number of kickoff returns per team to increase from 29 in 2024 to 65 in 2025.

== See also ==
- Punt
