= Outline of Canadian football =

Canadian team sport; a type of gridiron football

The following outline is provided as an overview of and topical guide to Canadian football:

Canadian football, or simply football, is a sport in Canada in which two teams of 12 players compete on a field 110 yards (101 m) long and 65 yards (59 m) wide, attempting to advance a pointed oval-shaped ball into the opposing team's end zone.

Canadian and American football have shared origins and are closely related, but have some significant differences. Canadian football is played with three downs, goalposts in the front of the end zone, and twelve players on each side. American football has four downs, goalposts in the back of the end zone, and eleven players on each side. Canadian football is also played on a wider and longer field, with deeper end zones.

== What type of thing is Canadian football? ==
Canadian football can be described as all of the following:

- An element of culture
  - A form of entertainment
    - A sport
      - A ball sport
        - A football sport
          - A form of gridiron football
      - A team sport

== Terminology ==
- Glossary of Canadian football terms

== Rules of Canadian football ==
- Canadian football rules

== Equipment and facilities ==
- Canadian football field
- Football

== Comparisons of Canadian football to other sports ==
- Comparison of Canadian football and rugby league
- Comparison of Canadian football and rugby union
- Comparison of American and Canadian football

== History of Canadian football ==
- History of Canadian football
  - Canadian Football League clubs in the United States

== Canadian football organized play ==
=== Official Canadian football organizations ===
- Football Canada
- Canadian Football League
- Canadian Junior Football League
- U Sports

=== Canadian football leagues ===
- Canadian Football League
  - List of Canadian Football League seasons
  - List of Grey Cup champions
- Canadian Junior Football League
- U Sports

=== Canadian football venues ===
- List of Canadian football stadiums

=== Canadian football Competitions ===
- Grey Cup
- Vanier Cup
- Canadian Bowl

=== Statistics, awards, and records ===
- List of Canadian Football League annual passing leaders
- List of Canadian Football League annual rushing leaders
- List of Canadian Football League annual receiving leaders
- CFL's Most Outstanding Player Award
- CFL's Most Outstanding Canadian Award
- CFL's Most Outstanding Defensive Player Award

== People influential in Canadian football ==
- Canadian Football Hall of Fame
- TSN Top 50 CFL Players

== See also ==
- Gridiron football
