= Glossary of gridiron football terms =

Glossary of gridiron football terms may refer to:

- Glossary of American football terms
- Glossary of Canadian football terms
