= One-minute warning =

The one-minute warning or the one-minute timing rule was a rule that dictated the flow of the game in the final minute of a half in some indoor American football leagues, most prominently the Arena Football League. During the AFL's final season in 2019, it occurred in the last half-minute of regulation or overtime.

At the one-minute mark of regulation or overtime, the referee announced: "One-minute Timing Rule in effect". During the final minute of play, the game clock changes from a continuously running clock (except for scores and time-outs) to a clock that mostly mirrored NCAA rules (stopping on first downs, out of bounds, incompletions, and so on.) For most of the league's history, any play that did not advance the ball across the line of scrimmage also stopped the clock; this prevented teams from kneeling to run out the clock. (This rule was repealed in 2018.) It also rewards defensive play, as a tackle for loss automatically stops the clock. Any player injured during this time and that team uses a timeout. The original one-minute timing rules remained in effect during the 2019 season of the China Arena Football League. But in 2024 the new Arena Football League returned the 30-second warning back to a minute.

In the former X-League, after the one-minute warning or in overtime, the "X-Bonus" rule came into play. All scoring during the final minute of play was worth double what it is normally worth, and a special black football was used.

Fan Controlled Football uses the One-Minute Timing Rule, but further stops the clock after every play in the final 30 seconds of a half. (This is a necessity in FCF, as fans vote on all offensive plays and each teams gets only one time-out each half, meaning without it, the clock would run out without getting a single play executed.)

== See also ==
- Two-minute warning (NFL)
- Three-minute warning (CFL)
