= Two-minute warning =

Special timing rules in American football

The two-minute warning is a suspension of play in an American football game that occurs when two minutes remain on the game clock in each half of a game, i.e., near the end of the second and fourth quarters, and overtime. Its effect on play is similar to that of a timeout: the game clock stops and the teams gather to discuss strategy. The suspension of play is two minutes long, the same as the short two-minute intermissions between quarters within each half. The rule is used in levels of professional football and is referred to as the two-minute timeout in the NCAA since 2024 and high school football in Texas since 2025.

The two-minute warning is called when the clock reaches exactly 2:00 if the ball is dead at that time. If the ball is in play when the clock reaches 2:00, the play is allowed to come to its normal end and the two-minute warning is called when the play ends. Therefore, it is not uncommon for the two-minute warning to be called with less than two minutes on the clock, for example 1:55. Regardless of when it is invoked, the clock is always stopped for the two-minute warning even if the situation would otherwise call for the clock to run. Furthermore, in dead ball situations, regardless of how much time remains on the play clock when the two minute warning comes into effect, that clock is always reset in the same manner it normally would be after a clock-stopping play. The game clock starts again when the ball is snapped for the following play.

Its name reflects its origins as a point in the game where the officials would inform the teams that the half was nearly over, as the official game clock was not displayed in the stadium at the time the two-minute warning was created. With the official game clock being displayed prominently on stadium scoreboards in modern times, the original purpose of the two-minute warning is no longer necessary, but it has nevertheless evolved into an important reference point in a game. A number of rules change at the two-minute warning, including several relating to the game clock. Therefore, the two-minute warning is often an important factor in a team's clock management strategy. An additional rationale for retaining the two minute warning is related to the value of television airtime at that point in the game. Television networks invariably run commercials as soon the two minute warning is called, with those slots being among the most lucrative of any in a major football telecast.

There is an additional two-minute warning in the rare event only two minutes remain in an overtime period, which lasts a maximum of ten minutes in the regular season (prior to 2017, the extra period ran fifteen minutes). However, in the postseason, where games continue indefinitely until there is a score, the usual timing rules for a half apply in overtime. Thus, there is no two-minute warning in the first overtime, but if in the second overtime, and any subsequent even overtime period, a game were to be still tied with two minutes remaining, there would be a two-minute warning.

== History ==
The origins are from the early years of the National Football League (NFL), when the official game time was kept by a member of the officiating crew, with the stadium clock being unofficial: its purpose was a checkpoint to ensure that the teams knew how much time remained in the game.

In the early 1960s, the upstart American Football League (AFL) made the stadium clock the official game time, a change followed later in the decade by the NFL shortly before its merger with the AFL. By that time, television was an important factor in professional football, so the two-minute warning was retained as a commercial break and to serve as "tension building" time, and thus has become an important part of the game's flow.

The NCAA adopted the two-minute warning rule for college football in 2024, but referred to the rule as the two-minute timeout, insisting that college football broadcasters refer to it as a timeout and not a warning, despite it functioning the same as a two-minute warning. A representative for the NCAA stated that the "warning" term was outdated because stadiums have kept the official game clock since the 1960s, so teams do not need to be warned about the game clock anymore, and that the NCAA opted for what it considered to be a more accurate phrasing. The NCAA's decision was criticized by fans and several media members, with a representative of the Big Ten stating that the conference would be in favor of using the "two-minute warning" term because "it is consistent with terminology currently in use and familiar to our fan base."

Texas is the lone state to adopt the two-minute warning for high school football, which the Texas Association of Private and Parochial Schools & University Interscholastic League approved in 2025. Unlike all other states and the District of Columbia, TAPPS & UIL uses the NCAA rule book, with several modifications which mirror the rules of the National Federation of State High School Associations.

== Rules ==
In addition to those practical purposes, gradually, some rules have evolved that are unique to the final two minutes of each half and overtime. There are no special events at the end of the first and third quarters, aside from the teams changing directions ("swapping end zones"), so there is normally not a two-minute warning during those quarters. Two-minute warnings in each quarter have been implemented in some exhibition games, such as the Pro Bowl during 2014–2016 and 2019–2022, and in some editions of the Senior Bowl.

=== 10-second runoff ===
The following situations (below) result in a 10-second game clock runoff if the team in possession of the ball is trailing, or the game is tied during that possession. If 10 or fewer seconds remain in the half/overtime/game, the runoff effectively ends the period/game. The offense can call a timeout to avoid the runoff. The defense can decline the 10-second runoff while accepting the distance penalty.

- Excessive timeouts due to injuries (see below)
- Instant replay overturns a call on the field and the correct ruling would not stop the game clock
- One of the following six fouls is committed by the offense. Following the runoff, the game clock will resume again once the ball is set.
  - False start (only if the clock was already running when the foul was committed)
  - Intentional grounding
  - Illegal forward pass beyond the line of scrimmage
  - Throwing a backward pass out of bounds
  - Spiking or throwing the ball away after a down (unless after a touchdown)
  - Any other intentional act that causes the clock to stop

Starting with the 2017 NFL season (and later in the 2024 NCAA football season, plus Texas high school football a year later), any review reversals with the clock running inside the two-minute warning will incur a 10-second runoff, unlike other offensive penalties, neither team can decline the runoff, which can be avoided if either team uses a timeout.

=== Injuries ===
If a player is injured and his team has timeouts remaining in that half/overtime, the timeout is automatically charged to that team to allow the injured player to be removed from the field. If a team is out of timeouts, they are allowed an otherwise-excessive "fourth timeout" (or third if overtime). However, to minimize the feigning of injuries to save game clock time, any subsequent injuries after the fourth timeout result in a five-yard penalty. Besides the excessive timeout, there is a 10-second runoff (if it was an offensive player that was injured and the clock was not stopped as a result of the play) or the play clock is reset to 40 seconds (if it was a defensive player).

Exceptions to the above include if the other team called a timeout immediately after the previous play; the injury was caused by a foul by an opponent; or the previous play resulted in a change of possession, a successful field goal, or was a conversion attempt.

The NCAA, Texas Association of Private and Parochial Schools & University Interscholastic League for Texas high schools adopted a rule in 2025 that requires a time-out be used (or a five-yard delay of game penalty if the team is out of time-outs) if medical personnel have to come on the field to tend to an injured player after the ball is spotted ready for play. After the two-minute time-out, a 10-second runoff also applies (and the five-yard penalty) if the team is out of time-outs.

=== Other rules ===
- Within the two-minute warning period (of either half/overtime), instant replay reviews can only take place if the replay assistant, who sits in the press box and monitors the network broadcast of the game, determines that a play needs review. Coaches may not use a coach's challenge.
- Within the two-minute warning period (of either half/overtime), if a player fumbles the ball, any player on his team can recover the ball, but only the fumbler can advance it beyond the spot of the fumble. If any other player from the same team recovers the fumble downfield, the ball is spotted back at the point where it was initially fumbled. This rule also applies to the offense or punting team on fourth down at any point in the game but applies to all downs and both offense and defensive teams after the two-minute warning. This rule was added for the 1979 season as a response to the September 1978 "Holy Roller" play.

== Strategy ==
The period of time between the two-minute warning and the end of the half is known as the two-minute drill. During this time, clock management becomes a more important aspect of the game, since by proper manipulation of the game clock, a team can, if trailing, prolong the game long enough to secure a score, or if in the lead, hasten the half's end before the opponent can score.

If the leading team has the ball on first down with less than two minutes to go in the game and the opposing team has no timeouts remaining, the quarterback can usually end the game by taking a knee thrice consecutively without risking injuries or turnovers. This is because at the end of each play, the offensive team can take up to 40 seconds to start running the next play.

== Other football leagues ==
The CFL has a three-minute warning. Indoor American football leagues historically used a one-minute warning once a minute remained in the half/overtime. Before 2024, no comparable rule existed at the high school or college levels; at the high school level, the officials are instructed to inform each sideline when three minutes remain in a half, but the rule does not stop the game clock. In April 2024, the NCAA Football Playing Rules Oversight Committee approved the addition of the two-minute warning, effective with that season. The 2022 version of the USFL used the two-minute warning, and stopped the game clock after first downs during that period. After the USFL merged with the 2020s version of the XFL (which stopped the clock after every play from scrimmage until the ball was spotted after each two-minute warning), the resulting United Football League adopted this USFL rule.
