= Touchback =

Ruling in American football

In American football, a touchback is a ruling that is made, and signaled by an official, when the ball becomes dead on or behind a team's own goal line (i.e., in their end zone) and the opposing team gave the ball the momentum, or impetus, to travel over the goal line, but did not have possession of the ball when it became dead. Such impetus may be imparted by a kick, pass, fumble, or in certain instances by batting the ball. Thus, a touchback is not a play, but a result of events that may occur during a play.

The result of a touchback is that the team in whose end zone the ball became dead receives possession of the ball and starts play with a first down at its own 20-, 25-, or 35-yard line, depending on the situation and league. A touchback is the opposite of a safety with regard to impetus since a safety is scored when the ball becomes dead in a team's end zone after that team — the team whose end zone it is — caused the ball to cross the goal line.

Since the 2018 season, touchbacks have also been awarded in college football on kickoffs that end in a fair catch by the receiving team between its own 25-yard line and goal line. In the 2023 season, the NFL adopted the same rules as college football in regard to awarding touchbacks on kickoffs that end in a fair catch. In 2024, the NFL changed its touchback rule on kickoffs to provide for different placements depending on how the ball entered the end zone. If the kick went into the end zone on the fly, or sailed over the end zone, the ball would be placed on the 30-yard line. The placement remained at the 20 for touchbacks resulting from kicks that bounced into the end zone. This was part of a radical change to the league's kickoff procedure. For the 2025 season, the placement on touchbacks following kickoffs that sail over the end zone or enter it on the fly was moved to the 35-yard line.

== Situations resulting in a touchback ==
Examples of instances where a touchback is awarded:

- A kickoff or punt enters the end zone and is downed by the receiving team without the ball being advanced beyond the goal line. Thus, a player on the receiving team could attempt to advance the ball out of his own end zone, but the original impetus from the kick remains as long as the ball does not completely cross the goal line into the field of play. If a kick is fielded by the receiving team in its end zone, is advanced beyond the goal line, and then the ball carrier retreats back into his own end zone where the ball is downed, it is a safety. If a member of the kicking team recovers a kickoff in the end zone, the play is ruled as a touchdown.
- In college football, any kickoff that ends in a fair catch by the receiving team inside its own 25-yard line. This rule also applies in Texas high school football because that state's base rule set is that of the college game.
- In high school football (except in Texas), any kicked ball that crosses the plane of the goal line, unless it is a successful field goal.
- A kickoff or punt touches the ground in the receiving team's end zone before being touched by a player of the receiving team. If a kicked-off ball goes into the end zone and then is recovered by a member of the kicking team, it is a touchdown for the kicking team, when the ball is touched by the receivers.
- A kickoff or punt goes out of bounds behind or over the receiving team's goal line or touches the goal posts or crossbar (and does not score a field goal).
- A ball carrier fumbles the ball within the field of play forward into his opponent's end zone and the loose ball then goes out of bounds behind or above his opponent's goal line, is recovered and downed by an opposing player in the end zone, or touches the pylon. The opposing team is awarded a touchback.
  - However, the current UFL does not award a touchback in this situation. It retained the rule used by both of its predecessor leagues, the second USFL and second XFL. In all three leagues, the offense retains possession at the spot of the fumble. If the fumble occurs on fourth down and the ball carrier had not reached the line to gain before the fumble, the defense gains possession at the spot of the fumble.
- A defensive player intercepts a forward pass in his own end zone and the ball becomes dead behind or over the goal line. Like the instance of a kickoff or punt fielded in an end zone, the intercepting player can attempt to advance the ball but it is still a touchback as long as the ball never completely crosses the goal line into the field of play before it is downed.
- A blocked punt goes back into the end zone and the defensive team intentionally bats or kicks the ball out the back of the end zone. The offense must decline the penalty.

== American football ==
In standard outdoor American football, the team awarded the touchback receives possession of the ball at either its own 20-yard line, 25-yard line, or 35-yard line, depending on the specific type of play. The spot is the 25-yard line in college football on kickoffs and free kicks after a safety, as well as free kicks after a safety in the NFL, with the NCAA having changed from the 20 in 2012 and the NFL making the same change in 2018. The NCAA made a further rule change effective in its 2018 season, treating a fair catch on a kickoff, or free kick following a safety, between the receiving team's goal line and 25-yard line as a touchback. The NFL adopted this later change in 2023, and changed its spot for touchbacks on kickoffs that enter the end zone on the fly or sail over it to the 30-yard line in 2024 and the 35-yard line in 2025. All other touchback situations in both rule sets result in possession at the 20.

In high school football, all touchbacks are spotted on the 20 except in Texas, which bases its high school rules on the NCAA rule set.

In the second XFL, the placement of the ball on a touchback depended on the circumstances:

- On kickoffs (including free kicks after a safety), if the ball entered the end zone on the fly and is downed by the receiving team, a "major touchback" was awarded, and the ball was spotted on the receiving team's 35. A kick that bounced into the end zone and was downed there by the receiving team resulted in the ball being spotted on the receiving team's 15.
- Similarly, a punt that went into the end zone was treated as a major touchback, with the ball spotted on the 35.
- Touchbacks awarded on other scrimmage plays resulted in the ball being spotted on the awarded team's own 20.

In arena football, and other indoor football games, a touchback results in the team awarded the touchback receiving the football at its own 3-yard line. This can result from any of the above events except for punting, which is not a part of arena football. (In arena football, a kicked ball usually bounces back into play off of the rebound nets, but the above can still occur when the ball lands in the slack nets behind the goalposts after a kickoff, passes under the rebound nets and out of play, or in the event of fumbles and interceptions.)

If a defensive player gains possession of the ball during a play between his own five-yard line and goal line and the player's original momentum carries him into the end zone, there is no touchback. Instead, the ball is dead at the point where possession changed. In the National Football League, this rule applies regardless of whether possession is gained inside the five-yard line. As of 2022 Shane Lechler is the all-time leader in NFL career punts resulting in a touchback, with 178.

== Canadian football ==
In Canadian football the term touchback is not used. The failure to advance a kicked ball out of the goal area results in a single point being scored by the kickers, as well as possession by the receivers at their 35-yard line or at the point the ball was kicked from. A turn-over by fumble or interception in the defense's goal area that is not advanced back into the field of play, or a kick that touches any part of the goalpost apparatus without subsequently going through the goalposts for a successful field goal results in a scrimmage on the 25-yard line with no points awarded. If a player's momentum causes the ball to be in the end zone, the ball is treated as if it was recovered in the end zone.

== Six- and eight-man football ==
For high schools which play six-man football and eight-man football on an 80-yard long field, a touchback is brought out to the 15-yard line.

== Differences ==
A special rule applies in college football and the NFL with regard to field goal attempts. If a missed field goal occurs in these leagues, the spot at which the non-kicking team receives possession of the ball depends on the spot from which the ball had been kicked. In NCAA football, the ball will be placed either on the 20 or the line of scrimmage of the play in which the attempt was made; in the NFL, either the 20 or the place from which the ball was kicked. (In either case, the ball goes to the spot that is further from the goal line.) The purpose of this rule is to discourage low-percentage, long-range field goal attempts and to deemphasize the advantage which can accrue when only one team has a kicker who has a reasonable possibility of success from a great distance. In American high school football (except in Texas) and in arena football, the field goal is treated as if it were a punt.
