= Three-minute warning =

Canadian football rule

In Canadian football, the three-minute warning is given when three minutes of game time remain on the game clock in the first and second halves of a game. (If the ball is in play when the clock reaches 3:00, the three-minute warning is given immediately after the ball is declared dead.) The three-minute warning stops the game clock in all cases. American football has a two-minute warning.

== Rule changes after the warning ==
- The game clock stops whenever the ball is dead.
- The game clock starts on the snap after any kickoff, kick from scrimmage, open field kick, change of possession, incomplete forward pass, score, or the ball being carried out of bounds, accepted penalty, or fouls on both teams. If a foul is declined, the non-offending team can choose to start the game clock on the snap.
- The game clock does not run on convert attempts.
- Since the 2006 CFL season, CFL teams cannot use instant replay challenges to dispute rulings during the final three minutes of the second half. However, a replay official may initiate a review during this time.
- The penalty for a "time-count violation" by the offence—failure to place the ball legally into play within 20 seconds of it being declared ready for play (a foul known as "delay of game" in American football, which is a different foul in Canada)—dramatically changes at the warning. Before the warning, the penalty is 5 yards with the down repeated. After the warning, the base penalty changes to loss of down on first or second down, and 10 yards with the down repeated on third down. Additionally, if the referee deems a time-count violation on third down to be deliberate, he has the right to require the offence to put the ball legally into play within 20 seconds or lose possession (similar to the unfair act clause in American football). However, the enforcement of time-count violations on convert attempts does not change at the warning; it remains 5 yards with the down repeated.
- In the CFL a team can call only one timeout after the three-minute warning in the second half. Teams receive two timeouts per game, thus if none are used prior to the final three-minute warning then the second timeout is effectively lost. Football Canada rules do not provide any timeouts.

== See also ==
- Glossary of Canadian football
- Two-minute warning
- One-minute warning
