= Single (football) =

One-point score in Canadian football

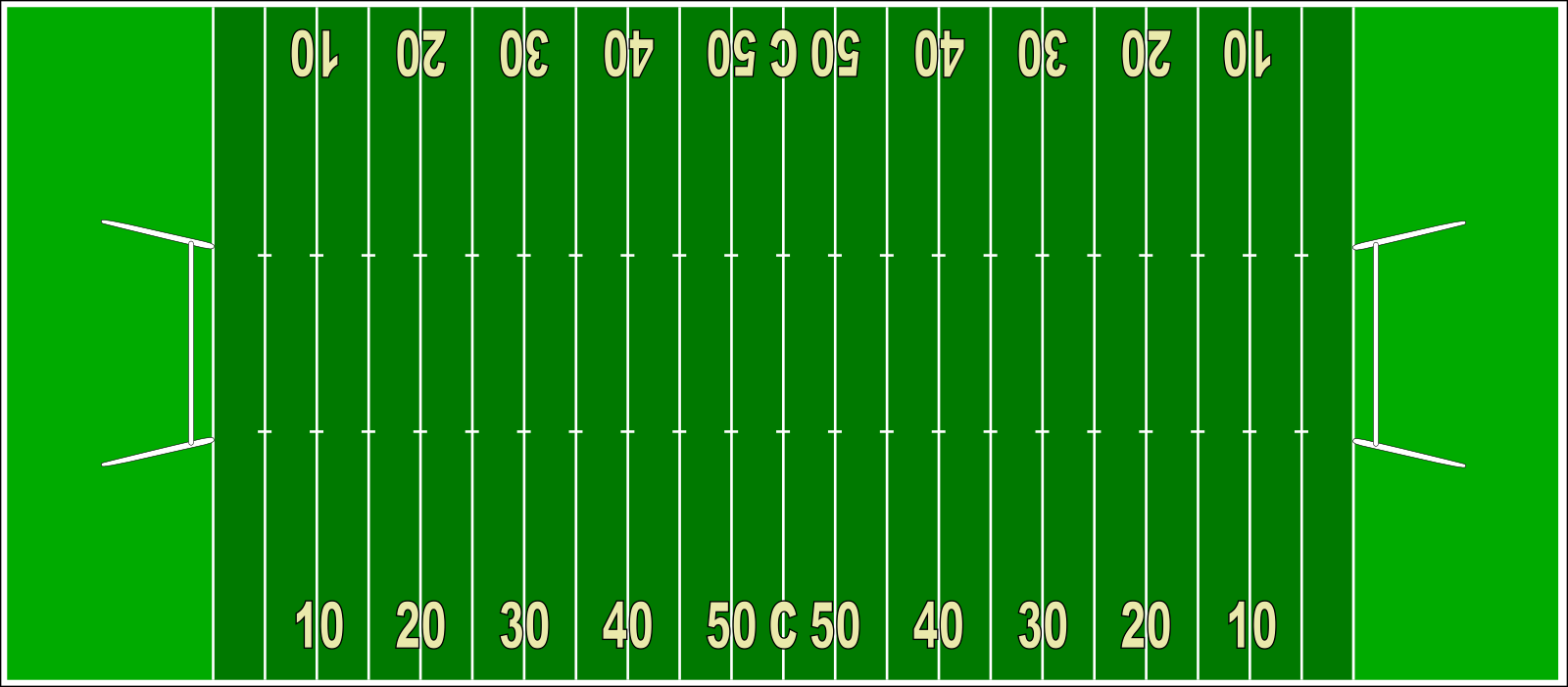
Diagram of a Canadian football field, which is wider and longer than an American football field.

In Canadian football, a single (also called a single point, or rouge) is a one-point score that is awarded for certain plays that involve the ball being kicked into the end zone and not returned from it.

== Rules ==
A single is awarded when the ball is kicked into the end zone by any legal means—other than a convert (successful or not) or a successful field goal—and the receiving team does not return (or kick) the ball out of its end zone.

A single is indicated by the referee raising his right arm and index finger. After conceding a single, the receiving team is awarded possession of the ball at its 35-yard line (Football Canada rules) or 40-yard line (CFL rules). When a single is scored on a missed field goal attempt, the team scored against has the option of taking possession at the previous line of scrimmage.

Singles are not awarded for situations not involving a kick; thus, interceptions and fumbles recovered by the defence and downed in their own end zone are ruled as a touchback and no points are awarded, as in American football. Under Football Canada rules, if a kickoff goes into the end zone and then out of bounds without touching the ground or a player, this is also a touchback; in the CFL, this scores a single. In each of the above cases, the defending team is awarded possession of the ball at its 25-yard line (CFL rules) or 20-yard line (Football Canada rules).

Until the 1970s, a doink—a field goal kick that hits an upright or the crossbar but does not carom through the goal—was a live ball, and thus a doink that bounced into the end zone and was not returned could score a single. Since the 1970s, Canadian football has followed American rules ruling the ball dead at the moment it hits a post, with no single awarded.

In the official rules, the single point is also called a rouge, French for "red". The origin is unclear.

=== Canadian Football League ===
The Canadian Football League (CFL) has discussed abolishing the single, but proposals to do so have been rejected. A 2005 proposal to reduce scenarios resulting in a single on missed field goal attempts was also rejected. A less-sweeping proposal would see the single eliminated on punts and field goal attempts that travel through the sidelines of the end zone – such a change would eliminate the "consolation" point for a failed coffin corner attempt. Other proposals would have the rouge scored only on kicks scrimmaged from beyond a certain point or are otherwise deemed 'returnable', having touched the end zone or a return team player without being advanced back into the field of play.

The lowest scoring game in CFL history, a 1–0 victory by the Montreal Alouettes over the Ottawa Rough Riders in 1966, had no scoring except for a single in the fourth quarter on a missed field goal attempt.

In the CFL and its predecessor leagues, the most rouges ever scored by one kicker in a game is 11, by Ben Simpson of the Hamilton Tigers against the Montreal AAA Winged Wheelers on October 29, 1910. The final score was 14–7 in favour of Hamilton. Hugh Gall holds the Grey Cup record, with eight singles for the Toronto Varsity Blues football team in the inaugural Grey Cup. However, this was before the modern CFL was founded, and so it does not count as a CFL record.

== Other football codes ==
In American football, Canadian football-type singles are not used. Receiving teams are allowed to down the ball in the end zone for a touchback, and kicking the ball out of bounds through the end zone also results in a touchback; in either case, the receiving team receives possession of the ball at either its own 20- or 25-yard line, depending on the specific level of play. It is possible to score a single point in American football on a conversion safety, a rule that also applies in Canadian football.

Some indoor American football leagues have used the single: the National Indoor Football League, the American Indoor Football Association and the Professional Indoor Football League, all now defunct. It was adopted by the Arena Football League for the league's 2024 revival. The single is possible only on kickoffs, applying if the receiving team fails to advance the ball out of its own end zone after having received the kick. The NIFL and AIFA also allowed a single to be scored by kicking a kickoff through the uprights (as in a field goal); this type of single was nicknamed (and was later codified in the AIFA rules as) an uno, from the Spanish word for the number one. (In the Indoor Football League, the National Arena League, and the 2024 iteration of the Arena Football League, this type of kick is worth two points, and is called a deuce; the 2024 AFL also recognized the traditional single, awarding one point for a kick that reaches the returning team's end zone but the returning team fails to advance it out thereof. Arena Football One recognized the deuce but not the single in 2025; it reintroduced the single under the name "one" for 2026.)

The concept of the rouge dates back to several public school sports played in England from the early 19th century. In Rossall hockey played at Rossall School and the Eton field game, both of which are still played, a rouge can be scored after the ball has gone into the local equivalent of the 'end zone' after striking another player. The Sheffield Rules, a 19th-century code of football, also used the rouge as a secondary scoring method, as did the first rules formulated by the Football Association in 1863. The behind used in Australian rules football is similar in concept to the Canadian single (worth one point whereas goals are worth six), as is the point in Gaelic football, hurling, and camogie (where a ball into the net scores three points, while a ball passing over the crossbar scores one).

== See also ==
- Glossary of Canadian football
