= Glossary of Canadian football terms =

This is a glossary of terms used in Canadian football. The Glossary of American football article also covers many terms that are also used in the Canadian version of the game.

Canadian Football League
The largest professional Canadian football league, with 9 teams split into two divisions each (West and East).
Canadian Junior Football League
The largest non-professional minor junior football league in Canada.
conversion
An untimed down awarded to a team that has just scored a touchdown. At levels below the CFL, including U Sports, the scoring team receives possession on the opponent's 5-yard line. In the CFL, the scoring team receives possession on the opponent's 25-yard line if it attempts a place kick, but at the 3-yard line if it chooses to run a standard scrimmage play. A place kick or drop kick through the uprights is worth 1 point; a play from scrimmage that would result in an offensive touchdown at other times in the game is worth 2 points. (This play is formally called a "try" in American football, but the terms "conversion", "PAT" [point after touchdown], and "point after" are more commonly used; the scrimmage play is called a "two-point conversion".)
convert
see: conversion.
cornerback
A defensive position on scrimmages. Typical formations include two cornerbacks, whose main duty is to cover wide receivers. See also defensive back.
defensive back
One of the players whose main duty is to cover wide receivers. Typical defensive formations include five defensive backs: two cornerbacks, two defensive halfbacks, and one safety.
defensive end
See defensive lineman.
defensive halfback
A defensive position on scrimmages. Typical formations include two defensive halfbacks, one on each side, but deeper than the cornerbacks. Their main duty is to cover wide receivers. See also defensive back.
defensive lineman
One of the players who line up opposite the offensive line on scrimmages. In a "four-three" formation, there are four defensive linemen: two defensive tackles and two defensive ends. In a "three-four" formation, there are three defensive linemen: one nose tackle and two defensive ends.
defensive tackle
See defensive lineman.
dribbled ball
A dribbled ball is one that has been kicked while not in possession of a player, for example, a loose ball following a fumble, a blocked kick, a kickoff, or a kick from scrimmage. The kicker of the dribbled ball and any player onside when the ball was kicked may legally recover the ball.
illegal procedure
A five-yard penalty against the kicking team or the offence. Most often it is a lineman who moves after taking a three- or four-point stance but before the snap. Other illegal procedures include kicking the ball out of bounds on a kick-off and "no end".
linebacker
A defensive player positioned behind the defensive line on scrimmages. In a "four-three" formation, there are three linebackers; in a "three-four", there are four. Linebackers can be used to blitz the quarterback, make tackles on running plays, or be used for pass coverage.
major or major score
An alternate term for touchdown.
no end
A penalty on the offence for having fewer than seven players within one yard of the line of scrimmage at the snap. It is most often called on field goal attempts because of the curved formation of linemen used: if the line is curved back too far, the ends are too far back to be considered linemen, and are called for "illegal procedure: no end". (This violation is known as an "illegal formation" in the American game.)
nose tackle
See defensive lineman.
no yards
A penalty against the kicking team: all offside (sense 2) players must be at least five yards from the ball when it is first touched by a member of the receiving team. This is now always a 15-yard penalty.
offside
Not onside. A player not onside incurs a five-yard penalty.
onside

1. Legally positioned at the kick-off or the snap. On kick-offs, members of the kicking team must be behind the kick-off line; members of the receiving team must be at least 10 yards from the kick-off line. On scrimmages, at the snap the offence must be behind the line of scrimmage; the defence must be at least one yard beyond the line of scrimmage.
2. A player of the kicking team who can legally recover the kick. The kicker and any teammates behind the ball at the time of the kick are onside. Thus on kick-offs all players of the kicking team are onside, but on other kicks usually only the kicker is. The holder on a place kick is not considered onside.

onside kick
A kick recovered by an onside player (sense 2).
pivot
An alternate term for the quarterback.
quick kick
A type of trick play: a punt from a running or passing formation, usually on second down. The play relies on catching the defence by surprise and using an onside player (sense 2) to recover the ball and gain a first down or even a touchdown. A rule change in the early 1970s that allowed the receiving team to block before gaining possession made the quick kick even more difficult to execute successfully, so it is rarely attempted today.
rouge
see: single.
safety

1. A defensive position on scrimmages, also called free safety. Typical formations include a single safety, whose main duty is to cover wide receivers. See also defensive back.
2. A two-point score. The defence scores a safety when the offence carries or passes the ball into its own goal area and then fails to run, pass, or kick the ball back into the field of play; when this term is used in this sense, it is also referred to as a safety touch.

short kick-off
Deliberately kicking the ball just over 10 yards on a kick-off in an attempt to make an onside kick. Short kick-offs are usually directed towards the sideline (left sideline for a right-footed kicker) to give members of the kicking team time to get downfield to recover it. It is illegal procedure if the ball is recovered before it has gone 10 yards downfield.
single
A one-point score. The kicking team scores a single when the ball is punted, drop kicked, or place kicked into the receiving team's end zone (without scoring a field goal or hitting the goal post) and the receiving team fails to run or kick the ball back into the field of play. The single also is scored if the kick goes out of bounds in the end zone, except on a kickoff. On a kickoff, the single is scored only if the ball stays inbounds and is not run out of the zone, or if the defence puts the ball out of bounds in the end zone.
spearing
An unnecessary roughness penalty of 15 yards imposed when the player drives his helmet into an opponent in an unnecessary and excessive manner. The referee's signal is a chopping motion above the head.
third down
The final of a set of three downs. Unless a first down is achieved or a penalty forces a replay of the down, the team will lose control of the ball after this play. If a team does not think they can get a first down, they often punt on third down or attempt a field goal if they are close enough to do so.
three-minute warning
In the Canadian Football League, the three-minute warning is given when three minutes of game time remain on the game clock in the first and second halves of a game.
third down conversion

The act of using a third down play to make a first down (also known as "going for it [on third down]"). These are comparatively uncommon. If a team is close enough to the goal posts, they will generally attempt a field goal on third down. Otherwise, they will usually punt. However, the coach may elect to try to get a new first down. This is more likely if the amount of yardage needed for the conversion is small (typically a yard or less), if the team is trailing by a significant amount (likelihood of such a try increasing as it gets later in the game), if a team is in a position on the field where a punt would likely result in a single point for them but a field goal attempt is unlikely to succeed (usually between the opponent's 40- and 50-yard lines) or during overtime where the team must score on that possession.

time count
A foul committed when the offence fails to put the ball in play within 20 seconds of the ball being declared ready for play. (This foul is called "delay of game" in American football.) Penalty: Before the three-minute warning and during convert attempts at any time in the game, 5 yards with the down repeated. After the three-minute warning, loss of down on first or second down and 10 yards on third down; the referee has the right to give possession to the defence for repeated time count violations on third down.
U Sports
The principal governing body of university sports in Canada, including college football. The organization has been formerly known as the Canadian Interuniversity Athletic Union, Canadian Interuniversity Athletics Union, and Canadian Interuniversity Sport.
yard
A yard is exactly 0.9144 metre. Despite Canada having mostly migrated to the metric system in the 1970s, the field in Canadian football remains measured in yards (as is the field in American football).
waggle
The act of running towards the line of scrimmage prior to the snap, as exercised by slotbacks. In Canadian football, only the 5 offensive linemen and the two ends (typically, wide receivers) aren't allowed to move prior to the snap.

== See also ==
- Glossary of American football
