= Comparison of American football and rugby =

Since rugby has two codes, a comparison of American football and rugby may refer to either:

- Comparison of American football and rugby union
- Comparison of American football and rugby league
