= Comparison of Canadian football and rugby league =

A comparison of Canadian football and rugby league football can be made because of their shared origins, resulting in similarities and shared concepts in terms of scoring and advancing the ball. Aside from American football, rugby league is the sport most similar to Canadian football. Both sports involve the concept of a limited number of 'downs'/'tackles', and in both sports scoring 'touchdowns'/'tries' takes a clear precedence over goal-kicking.

== Origins ==
British colonists and the British military in Canada brought rugby football to North America. It, along with association football, became popular in Canadian and American universities. At the time association football, or "soccer", and rugby were not as differentiated as they are now and teams would negotiate the rules before playing a game. The sports of Canadian football and American football evolved from these intercollegiate games.

Meanwhile, in England a schism developed in rugby football between those who favoured strict amateurism and those who felt that players should be compensated for time taken off work to play rugby. In 1895 this resulted in the formation of a break-away sport, rugby league, the rules of the two codes of rugby (union and league) would themselves diverge.

== Overview ==
Modern rugby league has been judged by William K. Frampton as having "an amazing resemblance to the original Canadian game". Frampton characterised rugby league as "so similar to the game Neil Taylor played that is effectively an improved version of it". However the games diverged subsequently resulting in major differences such as the forward pass, where the ball is thrown to a receiver located farther down field.

== The field ==
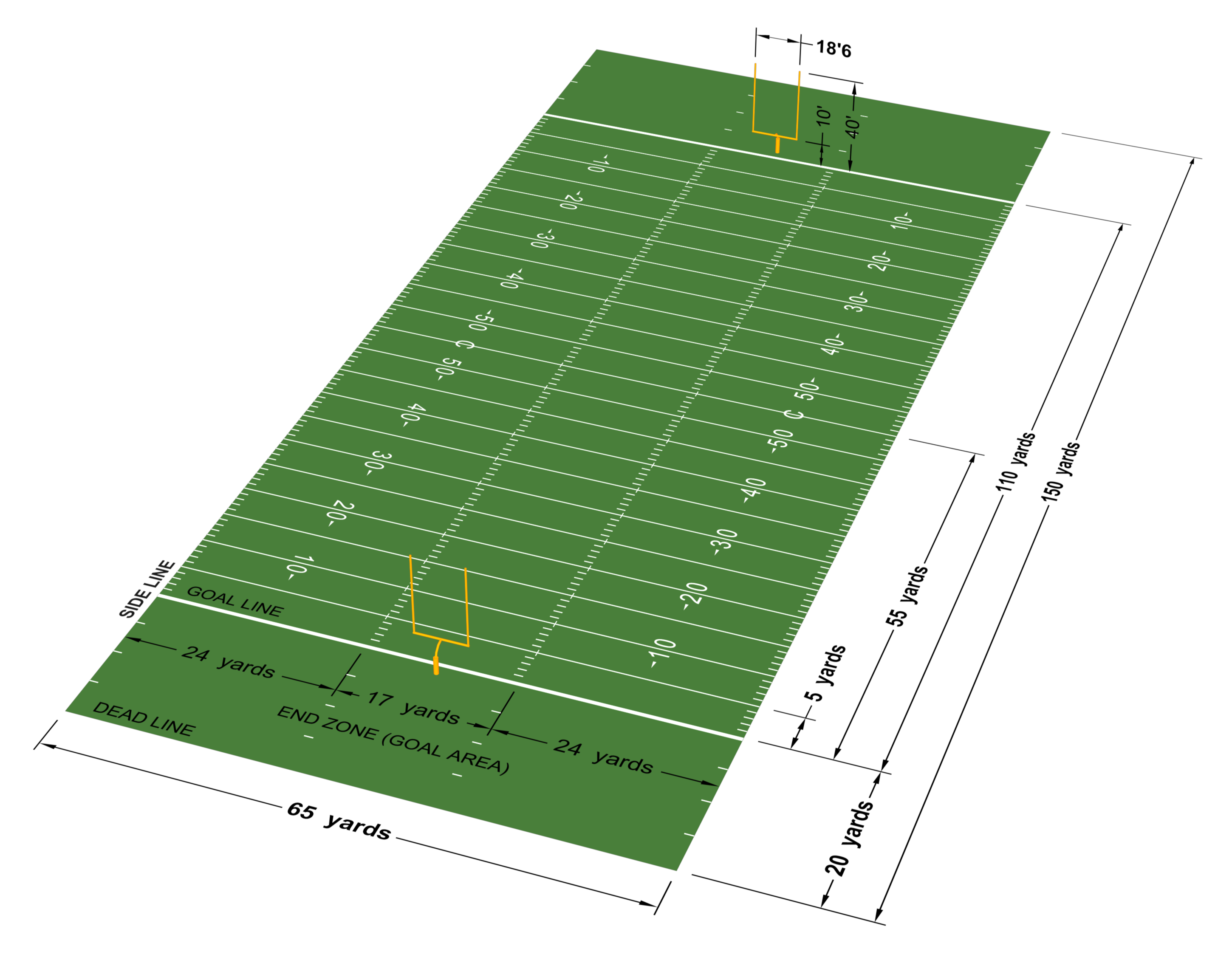
Diagram of a Canadian football field

A rugby league field

The Canadian football field is 110 yards (100 m) long and 65 yards (59 m) wide with end zones 20 yards (18 m) deep. At each goal line is a set of 40-foot-high (12 m) goalposts, which consist of two uprights joined by a 18 1/2-foot-long (5.6 m) crossbar which is 10 feet (3.0 m) above the goal line. The goalposts may be H-shaped (both posts fixed in the ground) although in the higher-calibre competitions the tuning-fork design (supported by a single curved post behind the goal line, so that each post starts 10 feet (3.0 m) above the ground) is preferred.

A rugby league field is similar, it may be 112-122 by 68 metres (122.5-133.4 × 74.3 yards). The longer boundary lines are touch lines, while the shorter boundary lines are dead ball lines. The touch lines and dead ball lines are out of play. Near each end of the field is a goal line, or try-line; they are 100 metres (109.4 yards) apart. A scoring area equivalent to an end-zone called the in-goal area extends 6–11 metres (6.6-12 yards) from each try-line to each dead ball line, the ball may be grounded to score a try here. On the goal line are a set of goal posts in the shape of the letter 'H', used for other forms of point scoring: drop goal, penalty goal and conversion.

== Players ==
Canadian teams have twelve players on the field per side. Different players may be interchanged at will for offence and defence as well as special teams for specific activities.

In rugby league the same players both defend and attack - a system known as the one-platoon system in Canadian football. There are thirteen players and four replacements in a rugby league team, with twelve interchanges of players allowed to be made throughout the game. If the interchanges are used up and a player becomes injured and cannot continue, the team simply has to play a man short.

== See also ==
- Canadian football
- Rugby league
- Comparison of rugby league and rugby union
- Comparison of Canadian and American football
- Comparison of American football and rugby league
- Canada national rugby league team
- Players who have converted from one football code to another
