= Comparison of rugby league and rugby union =

Comparison of two of the codes of the team sport rugby: rugby league and rugby union

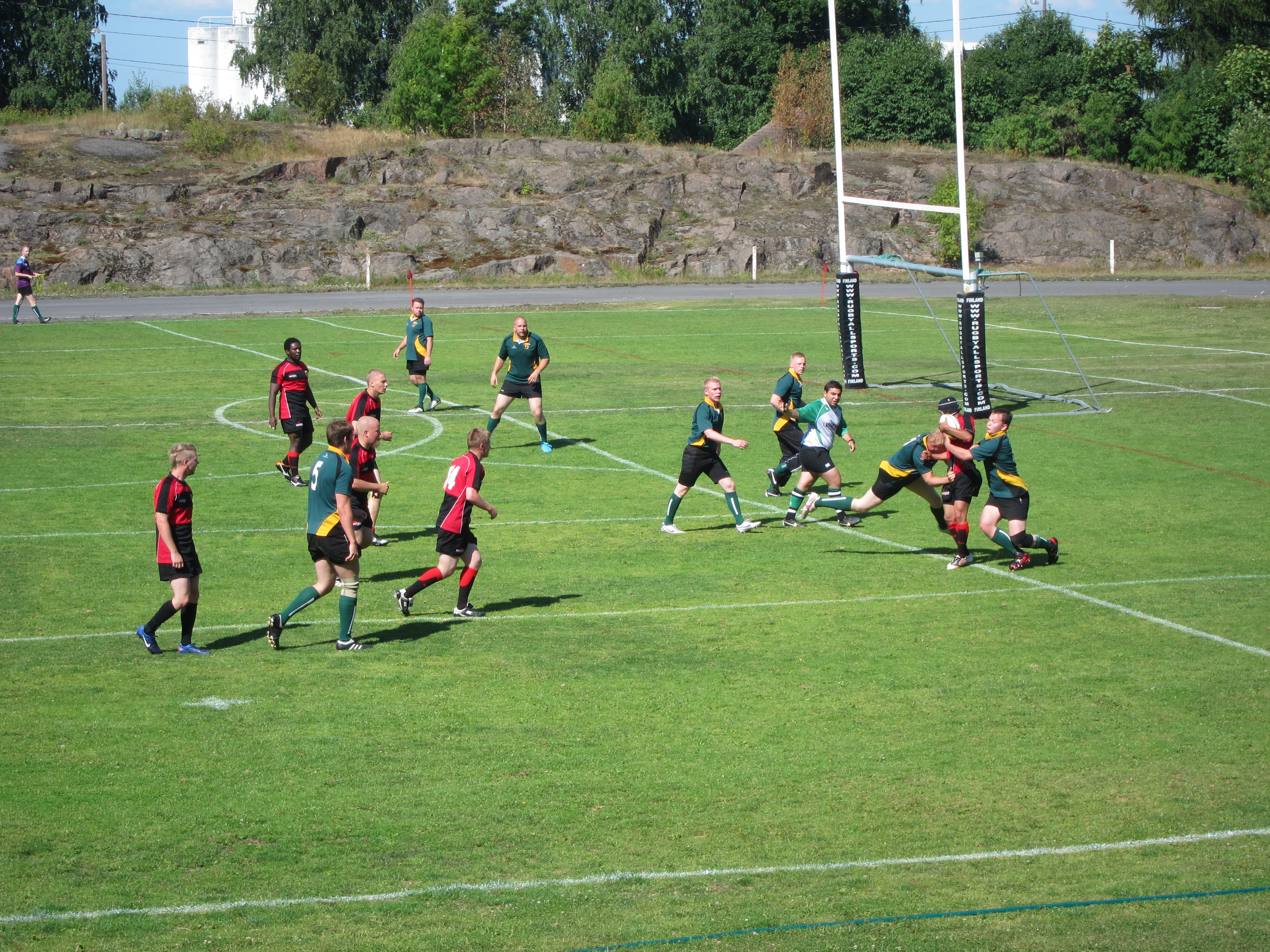
Griffins RFC Kotka, the rugby union team from Kotka, Finland, playing in the Rugby-7 Tournament in 2013

The team sports rugby union and rugby league share origins and thus have many similarities. Initially, following an 1895 split in rugby football, rugby union and rugby league differed in administration only. Soon, the rules of rugby league were modified, resulting in two distinct forms of rugby football.

After 100 years, in 1995 rugby union joined rugby league and most other forms of football as an openly professional sport.

The inherent similarities between rugby union and rugby league have at times led to the speculation about a merger of the two variants and experimental hybrid games have been played that use a mix of the two sports' rules.

== History ==
Rugby union was originally referred to as rugby football. During the early development of rugby football different schools used different rules, on many occasions agreeing upon them shortly before commencement of the game. In 1871, English clubs met to form the Rugby Football Union (RFU). Rugby football spread to Australia and New Zealand, with games being played in the early-to-mid-nineteenth century.

In 1892, charges of professionalism were laid against Yorkshire clubs after they compensated players for missing work. A proposal to pay players up to six shillings when they missed work because of match commitments was voted down by the RFU. On 27 August 1895, prominent Lancashire clubs declared that they would support their Yorkshire colleagues in their proposal to form a professional organization and the Northern Rugby Football Union, usually called the Northern Union (NU), was formed. The rugby union authorities issued sanctions against clubs, players and officials involved in the offshoot group, including amateurs who played with or against Northern Union sides. Until 1995, the RFU also banned any rugby league player from playing rugby union. After the schism the separate codes were named "rugby union" for the RFU code and "rugby league" for the NU code.

In 1906, All Black George William Smith joined with Albert Henry Baskerville to form a team of professional rugby players. George Smith cabled a friend in Sydney and three professional matches were arranged between a New South Wales rugby team before continuing on to the UK. This game was played under the rugby union laws and it was not until the team, nicknamed the All Golds, arrived in Leeds that they learnt the new Northern Union laws. Meanwhile, in Sydney a meeting was organised to look at forming a professional rugby competition in Australia. The meeting resolved that a "New South Wales Rugby Football League" (NSWRFL) should be formed, to play the Northern Union rules. The first season of the NSWRFL competition was played in 1908, and has continued to be played every year since.

During rugby league's 1921–22 Kangaroo tour of Great Britain, the Northern Rugby Football Union tried to arrange a match in Paris, but opposition from the Rugby Football Union-aligned French Rugby Federation made it impossible. In France rugby league split from rugby union in the 1930s. In 1948 the French instigated the formation of the International Rugby League Board as the world governing body for rugby league. France, New Zealand, Britain and Australia (who joined a few months later) were the founding countries. The International Rugby Football Board (IRFB) had formed prior to the schism in 1886 and remained the international governing body for rugby union, although it originally only consisted of England, Wales, Ireland and Scotland. Australia, New Zealand and South Africa joined the IRFB in 1948, France in 1978 and Argentina, Canada, Italy and Japan in 1991.

On 26 August 1995 the IRFB, now known as World Rugby, declared rugby union an "open" game and thus removed all restrictions on payments or benefits to those connected with the game. This came after rugby league accused rugby union of "shamateurism" to Inland Revenue in the UK and due to Kerry Packer signing top union players to professional contracts in secret for a breakaway union competition. According to The New York Times at the time:

Thirteen-man rugby league has shown itself to be a faster, more open game of better athletes than the other code. Rugby union is trying to negotiate its own escape from amateurism, with some officials admitting that the game is too slow, the laws too convoluted to attract a larger TV following.

== Naming ==
Although both rugby codes are forms of football, in many places, it could cause confusion as "football" is understood to mean association football, gridiron football, Gaelic football or Australian rules football depending on the country (or indeed region of the country). In much of the rugby union-playing world, the sport of rugby league is infrequently played and rugby union is commonly known simply as "rugby"; in countries where both codes are played, there is a need to distinguish between the codes of rugby.

In the United Kingdom, rugby union or rugby league fans rarely refer to their sport as "football" as in most cases this would refer to association football. Across the United Kingdom, rugby union is usually referred to simply as 'rugby' but in the North of England, the word 'rugby' could refer to either sport, but usually means "rugby league".

In Australia and New Zealand, rugby league is usually known as "league" or "football" with the latter term potentially confusing as Australian rules football and association football could also be called football. Rugby league is more likely to be called football (eg TV networks promoting "Friday night footy") in regions north/east of the Barassi Line (QLD, NSW, ACT) where rugby is more prevalent compared to AFL (Aussie Rules).

Rugby union is often simply referred to as "rugby" without the ambiguity that this term carries in the UK.

In France, rugby union is called rugby à quinze (rugby with 15) or simply "rugby", whilst rugby league is known as rugby à treize (rugby with 13) or jeu à treize (game with 13).

== Gameplay ==
Since the 1895 schism, changes have taken place to the laws of both rugby union and rugby league football so that now they are distinct sports. The laws of rugby league football have been gradually changed with the aim of creating a faster, more spectator-friendly sport. Player numbers were reduced to thirteen a side, creating more space for attacking play, and rucks and mauls were replaced with a play-the-ball restart. Changes to the laws of rugby union have been less extreme, although there have been adjustments in scoring as the game became more try-orientated rather than focusing on goals. In 2009, major law changes were implemented with the aim of making union simpler and more open. Rugby league historian Tony Collins has written that since turning professional in the mid-1990s, rugby union has increasingly borrowed techniques and tactics from rugby league.

Rugby union has more laws than rugby league and it has been described as being a more complex game. Rugby league in turn has been described as a simpler game that is easier for spectators to understand. Mat Rogers, an Australian dual-code rugby international player, has said "Rugby [union] is very complicated and rugby league is much more simple in comparison". England's Chris Ashton, also a dual international, has said that union has "more of a tactical side, more that can happen in a game". Ireland's Tom Court has said "Rugby union is a complex game with certain closed skills like scrummaging and line-out lifting and rugby league requires a higher level of fitness to compete at the highest level".

=== Similarities between the two codes ===
The two forms of rugby share the same basic rules of the game and use a similar-shaped ovoid ball. The aim is to score more points through tries, conversions, penalty goals and drop goals than the opposition within the 80 minutes of play.

Goals are scored when the ball is kicked between the two posts and over the cross-bar, either during open play or as the result of a penalty. A try is scored when the ball is touched down on or beyond the defending team's goal-line. The try-scoring side is given the chance to score two additional points by kicking a conversion similar to a penalty goal attempt from a point along a line which is parallel to the sideline at the same distance from the sideline as the place where the try had been scored.

The ball can be taken forward in three ways—by kicking, by a player running with it, or as the result of a set-piece. The ball can be passed from hand to hand between teammates in a backward or sideways direction; it may not be passed forwards although it can be kicked forwards. Dropping the ball in a forwards direction results in a scrum, a set-piece that restarts the game, except on the sixth tackle in league where the game restarts with a handover to the opposition.

Only the player holding the ball may be tackled. A rugby tackle is an attempt to bring the ball carrier to the ground or to stop his forward progress. Play restarts with the ball being transferred to another player.

The playing positions are divided into "backs"—generally faster and more mobile who score most of the points, and the larger, stronger "forwards" who are involved in the more physical aspects of rugby and generally do more tackling.

=== Possession ===
A big difference in gameplay between the two games is that rugby league has shed from its laws several opportunities for possession to be contested that rugby union has retained: contesting the ball after the tackle, on the ground in rucks and through mauls. When the ball goes into touch, possession in rugby union is contested through a line-out, while in rugby league a scrum restarts play. The lesser focus on contesting possession means there are fewer stoppages of play in rugby league, with the ball typically in play for 50 out of the 80 minutes compared to around 35 for professional rugby union. As the ball is in play more and there are fewer players (13 compared to 15) to cover the field, it has been implied that rugby league is the more physically demanding sport.

In union, the attacking team can hold onto and use the ball for as long as they are able, while the opposition's aim is to take possession of the ball from them. In league, each team can be tackled six times before handing over possession; moreover, the action stops after each successful tackle (i.e., the ball is not contested after a tackle). After being tackled five times, the attacking team will usually kick the ball either in an attacking kick or for territory. As the ball can only be contested during a one on one tackle in league, there is less scope for a turnover to occur than in rugby union. A study commissioned by the IRB found that between the years 2002 and 2004, possession was retained by the attacking team in 13 out of 14 tackles in rugby union. Collins has argued that the six tackle rule in rugby league offers a more even distribution of possession despite fewer opportunities to contest it. In both games, the attacking team loses possession if they drop or pass the ball forward, which results in a scrum being awarded to the defending team.

In union, possession can also be contested at line-outs (played after the ball has gone into touch) and scrums. It was found in the same study that the team with the ball at a scrum regained possession 90 percent of the time, while the team with the ball at a lineout regained possession 80 percent of the time. League does not have a lineout, but does utilise a scrum to restart play. It is uncommon for modern rugby league scrums to be contested, with the side awarded the scrum almost always gaining possession. Possession can also be contested following kicks to restart play from the halfway, 22 metre in both games (and from the goal line in league). Generally, league restarts are likely to go for distance unless possession is needed quickly (usually if a team is behind with very little time left to play). Union restarts are more likely to be short to allow players to contest possession in the air.

Possession may change the same ways in both games:

1. When the ball is kicked to the opposing team, this can be done at any time, but it is normal to punt on the last tackle in rugby league.
2. Following an unsuccessful kick at goal. If the kick at goal misses and goes dead, play is restarted with a drop out (at the 22-metre line in union and 20 metres in league).
3. When an opposing player intercepts a pass.
4. When the player in possession drops the ball and it is recovered by an opposition player.
5. If a player knocks the ball forward or throws a forward pass, the other team is awarded a scrum. In some cases, the referee may allow play to continue by the team picking up a dropped ball under the advantage rule.
6. If a player commits an illegal play, the opposing team is awarded a penalty and will receive the ball.

Possession may change in rugby league in a number of unique ways:

1. In rugby league if the ball goes out of play, the opposition are awarded a scrum. If this is from a kick going into touch on the full, this is called ball back and the scrum is formed where contact with the ball was made. Otherwise, under recent rule changes, the scrum is formed 20 metres from the point of touch. Penalties and 40/20 kicks are exceptions to this rule.
2. If a one-on-one tackle is attempted, the tackler can legally strip the ball from the attacking player as long as the referee has not called "held" or the attacking player has fallen to the ground to indicate a completed tackle.
3. An automatic handover takes place when the team in possession runs out of tackles, or a knock on happens on the sixth tackle.

Possession may change in rugby union in a number of unique ways:

1. In rugby union, if the ball goes out of play, the opposition may be awarded a line-out. The opposition are awarded a line out if the team in possession kicks the ball out of play and they have not been awarded a penalty before the kick.
2. In rugby union the attacking team may lose possession in a scrum, line out, maul, ruck, or tackle.

=== Tackling ===
In both games, tackling is permitted to either bring down the player in possession of the ball or prevent him from making forward progress. Tackling or interfering with a player who is not in possession of the ball is not permitted. Tripping with the leg is not allowed in either code. However, in rugby league, if a tackling player has both hands on the ball carrier, he is allowed to use his legs to bring him to ground.

In rugby league, a tackle is deemed to be complete when the elbow of the arm holding the ball touches the ground or the player is held in an upright tackle. The ball cannot be further advanced and a play-the-ball or handover must take place. In rugby union, a tackle is deemed to be complete when the player in possession is held on the ground; that player must play the ball (either releasing it, passing it, or if over the try line, grounding the ball) immediately. In rugby league, a play the ball takes place after each tackle. In rugby union, play does not stop when a player is forced to the ground in a tackle, as the tackled player must immediately play the ball, and the tackler must roll away, which will generally mean a ruck will form.

The laws of rugby league specifically outlaw the so-called "voluntary tackle": players are not allowed to go to ground unless they are effectively tackled by an opponent, though in practice this rule is rarely applied. There was no equivalent law in rugby union; in the past, going to ground with the ball and protecting it was practised, but in the modern game deliberately falling on the ground to gain an advantage is outlawed by Law 14: "The game is to be played by players who are on their feet. A player must not make the ball unplayable by falling down." A player who falls to ground with the ball or on it must immediately release or pass the ball, or get up with it.

=== Scoring ===
Union and league have the same ways of scoring, but there are significant differences in the points awarded, and a few minor differences in the laws governing the scoring of tries.

Overview of point scoring
Method of scoring	Rugby league	Rugby union
Try	4 points	5 points
Conversion	2 points	2 points
Penalty goal	2 points	3 points
Drop goal	1 point	3 points

The try is the main way of scoring in both codes; there are some subtle differences between the two codes, but the most obvious difference is that a try is worth 5 points in rugby union and 4 points in rugby league. A player tackled just short of the try-line in rugby league cannot reach across it and place the ball down for a try. This is not allowed in rugby league unless the momentum of the player continues to take him over the line in one continuous movement. If the tackle is complete, such a move would constitute a "double movement" and the try would be disallowed. The double movement rule is not explicit in rugby union but has been applied for similar movements.

In both games, a conversion following a try is worth 2 points. A drop goal is worth 3 points in union and 1 in league (although in the NRL, drop goals from more than 40m out of the try line are worth 2 points). A penalty goal is worth 3 points in union and 2 points in league. Due to the increased prevalence of infringements during contesting of the ball, penalties are a much more common occurrence in union than in league. This, combined with the higher number of points with a successful penalty conversion, results in penalties forming a considerably higher percentage of total points in a match of rugby union.

=== Laws ===
Use of a penalty box (or "sin bin") was introduced by rugby league in 1980. Rugby union had been experimenting with the same concept since 1979, although it was not formally sanctioned until 2001.

Video referee technology was first used for rugby league in 1996 and for rugby union in 2001.

In rugby league, the ball may be thrown or knocked out of play deliberately, while in union those are penalty offences. Kicking the ball out of play is legal in both codes.

When taking free or penalty kicks with a "tap and go" option, rugby league permits a stylised kick with the ball being tapped against the foot or lower leg while union requires the ball to leave the hands of the kicker. This difference in emphasis on a relatively trivial phase of play can be seen as indicative of the core differences between the games. In league, the kick is stylised as its purpose is to restart the game and to move to the run and tackle main play as quickly as possible. In union, where every phase of play has some element of competition, the trivial need to release the ball at any kick can result in a fumble that may give the opposition a chance to either contest possession or, if "knocked-on", will cause them to be awarded a scrum.

== Pitch ==
A rugby league pitch

A rugby union pitch

A rugby league pitch is between 112 and 122 metres long by 68 metres wide. The distance between try-lines is always 100 metres. There are lines going across the field which mark every ten metres. An in-goal area extends six to eleven metres beyond each goal line. At the goal line is a set of goal posts in the shape of the letter 'H', used for other forms of point scoring: drop goal, penalty and conversion.

A rugby union pitch is between 106 and 144 metres long by 68 to 70 metres wide. The length from try line to try line varies between 94 and 100 metres, with a distance of 6 to 22 metres between the goal and dead-ball lines. Lines are painted at the dead-ball line, goal line, 22-metre line, 10-metre line (broken line) and halfway. Lines are also located 5 metres away from the goal line and touchline and 15 metres away from the touchline. At the goal line is a set of goal posts in the shape of the letter 'H', used for other forms of point scoring: drop goal, penalty and conversion.

The dimensions of a rugby league pitch fit within the parameters of a rugby union pitch. Since World Rugby allowed professionalism in 1995, it has been possible for clubs to share facilities, including pitches. One such example was Leeds Rhinos and Yorkshire Carnegie, both part of the Leeds Rugby group, who shared Headingley Stadium.

== Players ==
A maximum of 15 players can play rugby union at any one time whereas rugby league permits 13 players. In both games, the positions are divided into "backs" and "forwards".

Overview of rugby players
Forwards versus backs	Rugby league position names (shirt numbers)	Rugby union position names (shirt numbers)
Forwards	front row forwards / props (8 & 10)	loose head prop (1) and tight head prop (3)
Forwards	hooker (9)	hooker (2)
Forwards	2nd row forwards (11 & 12)	locks / second rows (4 & 5)
Forwards	—	blindside flanker (6) and openside flanker (7)
Forwards	lock / loose forward (13)	eighth man / number-eight (8)
Backs	half-back / scrum-half (7)	half-back / scrum-half (9)
Backs	five-eighth / stand-off (6)	five-eighth / fly-half (10)
Backs	left centre (4) and right centre (3)	inside centre / 2nd five (12) and outside centre (13)
Backs	left wing (5) and right wing (2)	left wing (11) and right wing (14)
Backs	fullback (1)	fullback (15)

Many of the positions have similar names but are very different in practice. The position known as 'flanker' is not in rugby league; however, the second row in rugby league, shorn of the requirement to power scrums and catch at lineouts, is loose like the flankers in rugby union while the lock / loose forward in rugby league is similar to the number 8 in rugby union. In the backs, rugby league centres are split into left and right centre rather than inside and outside centres.

The reduction in the importance of the scrum and the removal of the line-out from rugby league, has meant it is a faster free flowing game. Very different skill sets and body types needed for the different positions has become more obvious as union players specialise more. For instance, props and hookers in rugby union tend to be among the physically strongest and heaviest players with high levels of scrummaging and mauling skills, but traditionally with limited speed and ball-handling skills. In rugby league, props are physically big, straight running forwards whose job it is to defend and to aggressively move the game forward while still possessing agility and good ball handling skills. Locks in union tend to be very tall and high jumpers, as this helps at line-outs; while this is not a necessity for league, the two second rowers and the loose forward / lock are mobile with speed across the park who can off-load on attack and contain and enforce on defence. They are similar to the loose forward trio of flankers and number eight in rugby union. Depending on their speed and ball playing skills, lock forwards in rugby league can generally play as both a forward and as an extra five-eighth.

Scrum-half is a specialized position in rugby union and similar to the hooker in league: the number 9 initiates most moves by his or her team and must be an excellent passer of the ball in rugby union as with league. In rugby league any player can act from dummy half; however, in the professional modern game, it is a specialised job for the hooker to instigate and direct the forward platform. He must also be able to probe with a running and varied kicking game from dummy half while still possessing strong and effective tackling.

The similarity between the two games has meant that players can switch between the two codes. League initially recruited big name players from union, like Herbert "Dally" Messenger in 1907, and the RFU responded by banning any player that played rugby league for life. A push into converting union players to rugby league, such as All Blacks John Gallagher, Frano Botica, Matthew Ridge and Va'aiga Tuigamala, occurred during the late 1980s and into the 1990s. When rugby union became professional, league players were allowed to play for rugby union teams, leading to a reversal in cross-code switching. Gallagher, Botica and Tuigamala returned to union, while leading league players such as Jason Robinson, Wendell Sailor, Mat Rogers, Lote Tuqiri, Henry Paul and Iestyn Harris, took up rugby union contracts. Sailor, Rogers, Tuqiri, Paul and Harris subsequently switched back to rugby league. Players who play international rugby in both codes are known as dual-code internationals.

== Cross-code games ==
In 1909, when the new "Northern Union" code was still in its infancy, a match between the Kangaroos and the Wallabies was played before a crowd of around 20,000, with the rugby league side winning, 29–26. With the wartime Emergency League suspended, Leeds Rugby League reverted to rugby union during World War I to play a one-off challenge game against the Royal Navy Depot from Plymouth in 1917. This was precursor to the following Christmas when two Challenge games were organised between the two sides but this time with one of each code. The Navy won the union game, 9–3, on Christmas Eve but proved equally adept at league recording a 24–3 win on 28 December.

During World War II, the RFU relaxed its restrictions on rugby league footballers playing rugby union. In 1943, a Northern Command army rugby league side defeated a Northern Command union side, 18–11, at Headingley under rugby union laws. The following year a Combined Services rugby league side beat a Combined Services union side, 15–10, at Bradford again at rugby union. These were the only league v union matches played until 1996.

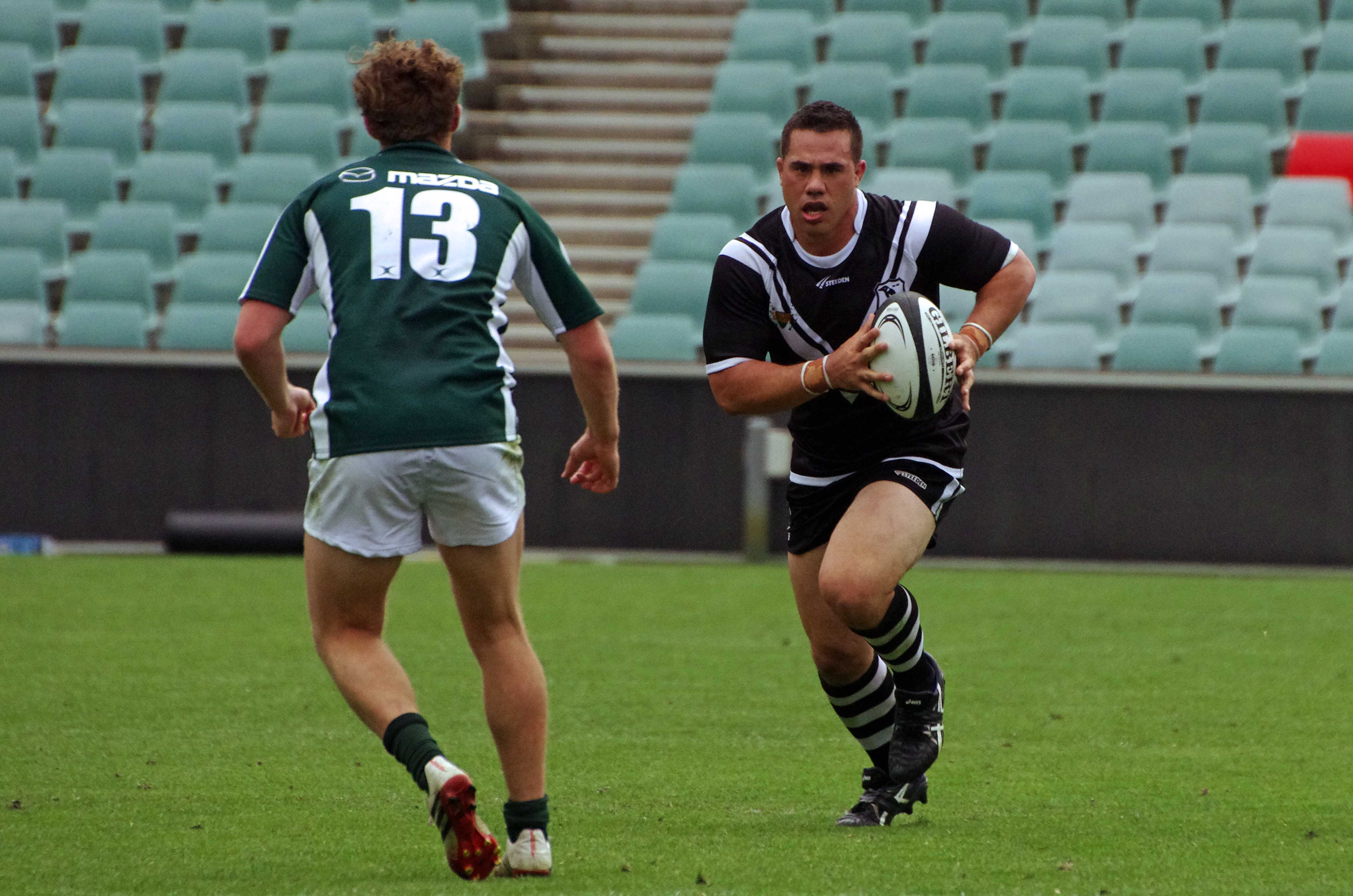
Bronson Harrison of the Western Suburbs Magpies playing in a 2015 hybrid rugby match

With both sports becoming professional matches between union and league teams have been played. In May 1996, Bath Rugby and Wigan RLFC, who were then England's top union and league sides respectively, made history by playing against each other at both codes of rugby. Wigan won, 82–6, in the first match, played under league rules, and lost the second, 44–19, under union rules.

In January 2003, St Helens rugby league took on Sale rugby union in a single game played at Knowsley Road, intended to have one half under league rules and the other under union rules. Unlike Bath, who were to all intents and purposes still the amateur side they had been, Sale had the benefit of almost a decade of professionalism to improve both strength and fitness that was necessary for them to adapt to the constant tackling required in rugby league. Sale finished the first half with a 41-0 lead under union rules, before Saints replied with 39 unanswered points in the second half played under league rules - the match ending 41–39 to Sale.

In October 2015, rugby league side Western Suburbs Magpies played rugby union side Randwick in a 'hybrid rugby' game played by a 13-a-side game which featured rugby league laws when in the team's own half and union rules when in the opposition half. The Magpies won 47–19.

In 2024, the '745 game', under compromise rules, was played at Headingley to honour former rugby league player Rob Burrow and former rugby union players Doddie Weir and Ed Slater who developed Motor Neurone Disease and to raise funds to aid research into this condition. The match ended in a 33-21 victory for the league side.

== Demographics ==
Geographic locations of top tier professional rugby league ( Super League) and union ( Premiership Rugby and United Rugby Championship) clubs in the United Kingdom and Ireland.

Traditionally, the two rugbys have been seen as divided along class lines, with union associated more with the middle class, and league with the working class. One of the main reasons for the split was union's enforcement of the amateur principle, meaning that working class players could not afford to take time off work to play the sport.

In England, rugby union is widely regarded as an "establishment" sport, played mostly by members of the upper and middle classes. For example, many students at public schools play rugby union. In contrast, rugby league has traditionally been seen as a working class pursuit.

In Wales, early rugby union teams consisted of working class players who were industrial labourers – coal miners and factory workers.

In Australia, the two codes were also strongly divided down class lines. Support for both codes is concentrated in New South Wales, Queensland and the Australian Capital Territory. The same perceived class barrier as exists between the two games in England also occurs in these states, fostered by rugby union's prominence and support at private schools.

== Ball ==
The balls for rugby are very similar, both a prolate spheroid shaped ball. Rugby league balls are similar in size to rugby union balls, but are more pointed at the edges.

== Finance and scale ==
In the UK, the "two codes" of rugby are very different in scale and turnover. The turnover of the RFL was reported as £19m in 2014. For comparison, the turnover of the Rugby Football Union in 2014 was £150m. The number of rugby union players in England is 1.99 million (predominantly school and children's teams following a RFU drive to increase participation) but which includes 131,000 senior male players. The number of players participating in any capacity in rugby league in England (including wheelchair users) is about 100,000.

In Australia, rugby league had 1,430,367 participants in the sport (including school clinics) and 167,533 registered players in 2021. The Australian Rugby League Commission reported a gross revenue of $185,668,873 and a gross profit of $14,675,845 in the 2022 financial year. Rugby union in 2012 had 323,115 participants, including 50,000 registered juniors. The ARU in 2012 had gross revenues of $96.6m, but had a net deficit of $8.3m. A significant portion of rugby union's revenue is derived from the national team touring overseas and visiting tours, while rugby league's is largely generated by its strong domestic league.

The number of rugby union players in New Zealand is estimated to be 129,000, with 95,721 playing rugby league.

Rugby union generally has a broader reach around the world, largely due to the unrestricted spread of the game across commonwealth countries, promulgated by British armed forces, during a time when the armed forces banned rugby league in the early 20th century. For example, it is a popular sport in a number of countries such as South Africa and Argentina.

== International competitions ==
=== Six Nations and The Rugby Championship ===
The oldest international rugby union competition is the Six Nations Championship, the men’s version, starting in 1883 with games played between England, Wales, Ireland and Scotland. France joined in 1910 and Italy in 2000. The women’s version of the Six Nations Championship was inaugurated, 2 years after the men’s version. In 1996 the Southern Hemisphere teams of South Africa, Australia and New Zealand started their own annual international competition known as the Tri Nations; it adopted its current name of The Rugby Championship when Argentina joined in 2012.

=== Rugby Union Sevens at the Summer Olympics and the Commonwealth Games ===
Rugby union was previously a medal sport at four Olympic games, in Paris (1900 and 1924), London (1908) and Antwerp (1920), and returned to the Olympics in 2016 in the sevens form. Rugby union sevens is a core event at both the Commonwealth Games and the Asian Games.

=== Rugby League Four Nations ===
The major annual international competition in rugby league was the Four Nations, first played in 1999. It originally involved Britain, Australia and New Zealand before expanding to include a fourth invited nation in 2009. The competition was last held in 2016.

=== Rugby League World Cup ===
Rugby league introduced its World Cup for men in 1954 and it has been held intermittently since, in various formats, Great Britain won the inaugural men’s version of the Rugby League World Cup, while the women’s version of the Rugby League World Cup was first played in 2000 and New Zealand won the inaugural women’s version of the Rugby League World Cup. The Wheelchair Rugby League World Cup was first held in 2008 and England won the inaugural title. The Physical Disability Rugby League World Cup was first held in 2022 and England won the inaugural title.

=== Rugby Union World Cup ===
Rugby union's first World Cup for men was held in 1987 and is contested every four years. New Zealand won the inaugural men’s version of the Rugby Union World Cup. The women’s version of the Rugby Union World Cup was first played in 1991, and is held every four years, alternating with the men’s version, to avoid clashing with other sporting events such as Rugby 7s at both the Commonwealth Games and the Summer Olympics. The United States won the inaugural women’s version of the Rugby Union World Cup.

=== Rugby League Nines ===
There is a newer version of the Rugby League tournament, which is known as the Rugby League Nines. The inaugural Rugby League Nines World Cup was launched in 2019. Australia won the men’s version of the Rugby League Nines World Cup while New Zealand won the women’s version.

== Attendances ==
The rugby league and rugby union clubs with an average home league attendance of at least 20,000 in the 2024-25 or 2025 season:

#	Club	Sport	Country	Average
1	Brisbane Broncos	Rugby league	Australia	41,185
2	Union Bordeaux Bègles	Rugby union	France	32,864
3	Canterbury-Bankstown Bulldogs	Rugby league	Australia	30,688
4	Leinster	Rugby union	Ireland	26,930
5	Eastern Suburbs	Rugby league	Australia	25,846
6	New Zealand Warriors	Rugby league	New Zealand	25,382
7	Melbourne Storm	Rugby league	Australia	23,959
8	Harlequin	Rugby union	England	23,837
9	Dolphins	Rugby league	Australia	21,820
10	Newcastle Knights	Rugby league	Australia	20,884
11	Waratahs	Rugby union	Australia	20,572

== See also ==
- Comparison of American football and rugby league
- Comparison of American football and rugby union
- Comparison of Canadian football and rugby league
- Comparison of Canadian football and rugby union
- Comparison of Gaelic football and rugby union
- Comparison of Association football and rugby union

== Sources ==
- Collins, Tony (2006). Rugby League in Twentieth Century Britain. doi:10.4324/9780203088357. ISBN 978-1-134-22145-5.
- Collins, Tony (2007). Rugby's Great Split. doi:10.4324/9780203969977. ISBN 978-1-134-22138-7.
- Collins, Tony (2009). A Social History of English Rugby Union. doi:10.4324/9780203885444. ISBN 978-1-134-02335-6.
- Davison, R. C. Richard; Smith, Paul M.; Hopker, James; Price, Michael J.; Hettinga, Florentina; Tew, Garry; Bottoms, Lindsay (2022). Sport and Exercise Physiology Testing Guidelines: Volume I – Sport Testing. doi:10.4324/9781003045281. ISBN 978-1-003-04528-1.
