= Comparison of American football and rugby league =

A comparison between American football and rugby league is possible because of their shared origins and similar game concepts. Rugby league is arguably the most similar sport to American football after Canadian football: both sports involve the concept of a limited number of downs/tackles and scoring touchdowns/tries takes clear precedence over goal-kicking.

Generally, American football games last much longer than 80-minute rugby league matches. Because the field is reset after each tackle in American football, it is much slower-paced than the more hectic rugby league, in which play stops for only as long as it takes the tackled player to get back to his feet and return the ball to play. Another major difference is that only the player with possession of the ball may be interfered with in rugby league; defending players interfering with any other attacking player (and vice versa) will incur a penalty. Passing in the two sports also differs: while backward passing is common to both sports, in American football players are allowed to throw the ball forward in certain situations whereas in rugby league forward passing is always illegal. Rugby league footballers have to kick the ball or run it forward to advance it downfield. To score a try or touchdown in rugby league, the player has to push the ball directly onto the ground once in the try zone, whereas in American football the player has to simply have possession of the ball as it crosses the plane of the goal-line, or receive a forward pass while in the end zone.

American football requires its players to use a large amount of protective equipment, including helmets, gloves and padding around the body, whereas protective clothing is much more minimal in rugby league, usually amounting to light padding (if any) and soft headgear (hard helmets being illegal). The playing fields of both sports are similar in size with a rugby league playing field being 100 metres (110 yd) long while an American football field is 100 yards (91 m) long.

== Origins ==
Both sports descend from the older game of rugby football, which originated in 19th Century England. British colonists and the British military in Canada brought football to North America. It became popular in American and Canadian universities and prep schools. At the time, association football and rugby football were not as differentiated as they are now and teams would negotiate the rules before playing each game. The sports of American football and Canadian football evolved from these intercollegiate games.

Meanwhile, in England a schism developed in rugby football between those who favoured strict amateurism and those who felt that players should be compensated for time taken off work to play rugby. In 1895, this resulted in the formation of a break-away sport, rugby league, which permitted player payments. At first, the two rugby codes differed only in how they were administered; over time, their playing rules diverged to the point that they are now distinctly different forms of football.

== The field ==
An American football field

A rugby league field

American football is played on a rectangular field 120 yards (110 m) long by 53 1/3 yards (48.8 m) wide. Near each end of the field is a goal line, which are 100 yards (91 m) apart. A scoring area called an end zone extends 10 yards (9.1 m) beyond each goal line. Yard lines cross the field every 5 yards (4.6 m), two rows of hash marks run parallel to the side lines near the middle of the field. At the back of each of the end zones, there are a set of goalposts. American football goalposts were formerly H-shaped and were located on the goal line, but; in 1967, the NFL adopted the current modern offset-fork design, made from extruded steel pipes. The goalposts currently consist of two vertical posts 18.5 feet (5.6 m) apart (24 feet (7.3 m) in high school football) rising from a horizontal crossbar, which is mounted on a single central support post that raises the crossbar to a height of 10 feet (3.0 m), resulting in a two-tined fork shape. The central vertical post is offset from the crossbar toward the rear, placing it as far as possible from the field of play; it is also usually padded to minimize collision-related injuries. In 1974, in the effort to create a safer, unimpeded field of play in the end zone, calculated to produce more passing touchdowns, the NFL relocated the goalposts from the goal line to the end line.

A rugby league field has very similar dimensions, being up to 120 metres (130 yards) long and 68 metres (74 yd) wide. Lines cross the field marking every 10 metres (11 yd). The goal posts are situated on the goal line and are therefore separated by exactly 100 metres (110 yd). The area beyond each goal post, known as the in-goal area, extends for another 6–11 metres (6.6–12.0 yd). In rugby league, the goal posts are usually H-shaped, each post being 16 metres (52 ft) high and 5.5 metres (18 ft) apart, with the cross bar being 3 metres (9.8 ft) high. American football "tuning fork" goal posts are allowed in rugby league, provided the posts and cross bar are at the required dimensions. The goal posts are used for other forms of point scoring in rugby league: drop goals or field goals, penalty goals and conversions.

== Players ==
As four replacements in a rugby league team, with only twelve interchanges of players allowed to be made throughout the game (eight in the Australian NRL). If the interchanges are used up and a player becomes injured and cannot continue, the team simply has to play short handed. All players must attack and defend and there is no equivalent of special teams.

Prior to the 1960s, and in arena football (an indoor variant of the American game) from 1988 to 2007, American football did use a one-platoon system in which most players were required to play all facets of the game, severely limiting substitution, much as rugby league (and most other sports) continue to do. Most levels of American football abolished the one-platoon system in the late 1940s and early 1950s, although college football re-implemented it for a short time in the 1950s and 1960s.

Broadly speaking, offensive and defensive linemen in American football correspond to forwards in rugby league and other players are somewhat similar to backs. Basically the job of the forwards in rugby league is to get the ball over the advantage line and give the backs space and a chance to be creative and move the ball around, which will hopefully result in points. However, rugby league footballers are far less specialised than American football players.

Many of the positions have similar names but in practice are very different. A fullback in American football is very different from a fullback in rugby league. However, some of the positions are fairly similar: for instance, the stand-off/five-eighth and halfback carry out a similar role to a quarterback in American football.

== Advancing the ball ==
In American football, the team that's in possession of the ball (the offense) has four "downs", to advance the ball 10 yards towards the end zone. When the offense gains 10 yards, it gets another set of four downs. If the offense fails to gain 10 yards after 4 downs, it loses possession of the ball.

A down ends, and the ball becomes dead, after any of the following:

- The player with the ball is tackled.
- A forward pass goes out of bounds or touches the ground before it is caught. This is known as an incomplete pass. The ball is returned to the original "line of scrimmage" for the next down.
- The ball or the player with the ball goes out of bounds.
- The player either goes or is forced out of the field (out of bounds)
- The offense turns the ball over to the defense.
- A team scores.

This closely resembles the six-tackle rule in rugby league. Originally, tackles were unlimited in rugby league, as they are in the related sport of rugby union. As this could result in long periods with one team in possession of the ball, in 1966 the game's administrators implemented the limited tackle rule from American football. At first, the number of tackles was set at four, as in American football; it was later extended to six to give teams more time to develop attacking play. After six tackles, the team with the ball has to hand over possession to the opposing team. A key difference with American football is that there is no automatic way of earning a new set of tackles in rugby league. (Note: There are four main ways by which a team with the ball can extend possession in rugby league: kicking a 40-20, kicking the ball to an opposing player and then tackling him in his team's in-goal area, when the defending team commits a penalty or by the attacking team simply scoring a try (where they are rewarded with another set of six tackles). All four options are either difficult to achieve frequently or depend on factors outside the attacking team's control.) Each set is effectively a chance to score, with failure to do so resulting in relinquishing possession. Another major difference is that play stops briefly when the player in possession of the ball is tackled as it resumes as soon as he gets to his feet and returns the ball to play.

Players can advance the ball in two ways in American football:

- By running with the ball, also known as rushing. One ball-carrier can hand the ball to another; this is known as a handoff.
- By passing the ball forwards to a teammate. This can only be performed once on a down, and cannot be attempted after the ball crosses the line of scrimmage. The illegal forward pass rule has changed several times, with the current NFL rule being that the passer's entire person must be beyond the line of scrimmage for a forward pass to be illegal. The passer (most often the quarterback but not always so) can therefore straddle the line of scrimmage, or even be mostly beyond it, but still legally pass the ball, regardless of where the ball is in relation to the line of scrimmage.

In rugby league the ball cannot be passed forward, so players can advance the ball by either running with it, or kicking it ahead and chasing it. This concept is preserved in American football; any player may pass the ball backwards, regardless of player position and location of the field. In addition, a ball passed backwards remains live, even if not caught, so long as it remains in play, similar to rugby league.

Following a down, the ball is returned to play within a restricted time limit by a "snap" in American Football. All players line up facing each other at the line of scrimmage. One offensive player, the center, then passes (or "snaps") the ball back between his legs to a teammate, usually the quarterback and play commences.

In rugby league the ball is returned to play following a tackle via the "play the ball", in which the tackled player gets back to his feet and rolls the ball back to a teammate, usually the hooker. The tackled player will usually try to return to the ball to play as quickly as possible before the defensive line can re-form.

Possession may change in different ways in both games:-

1. An automatic handover takes place when the team in possession runs out of downs / tackles.
2. When the ball is kicked to the opposing team. This can be done at any time but it is normal to punt on the last down / tackle.
3. Following an unsuccessful kick at goal.
4. When an opposing player intercepts a pass.
5. In rugby league the opposition are awarded a scrum if the player in possession drops the ball forwards or makes the ball go forwards with any part of his body other than his feet. This is called a knock-on.
6. When the player in possession drops the ball and it is recovered by an opposition player. This is called a fumble in American football and a knock-on in rugby league.
7. In rugby league if the ball goes out of play, the opposition are awarded a scrum the "loose head and feed" of the scrum. Penalties and 40/20 kicks are exceptions to this rule.
8. In American football possession changes hands following a successful score and the team scoring kicks off to the opposition. In contrast, in rugby league the team who conceded the points must kick off to the team who scored. (In some amateur levels of American football, and in Canadian football, the team who conceded the points has the option of kicking off to the opposition rather than receiving the kickoff, but this option is extremely rarely invoked.)
9. In American football, on a kickoff following a score the kicking team may try an onside kick to attempt to retain possession for themselves. The kicker either dribbles the ball forward or, more popularly, drives the ball into the ground in an attempt to make it bounce high into the air for a teammate to catch. The ball must travel 10 yards before it is touched by the kicking team, or be first touched by the receiving team. A similar tactic is used in rugby league, called a short kickoff. A high cross-field kick towards jumping receivers is popular. The kick must travel at least 10 metres forward before being caught. In both codes the tactic is most often attempted by a team that is behind late in a game, but may be tried at other times as a surprise tactic.

In both codes, tactical kicking is an important aspect of play. However, kicking in general play is more common in rugby league. Kicking is far more heavily restricted in American football; the rules currently prohibit a player from kicking the ball after he has crossed the line of scrimmage, whereas a rugby league footballer can kick the ball at any time, from any point on the field. In rugby league, a player can receive a kick (and still maintain possession) if he is behind the kicker at the time of the kick; that feature is not allowed in the American game, except in the onside kick scenario described above.

== Passing ==
In American football, the offense can throw the ball forward once on a play from behind the line of scrimmage. The forward pass is a distinguishing feature of American and Canadian football as it is strictly forbidden in rugby league.

The ball can be thrown sideways or backwards without restriction in both games. In American football this is known as a lateral and is much less common than in rugby league. The lateral is most commonly seen on plays at the very end of the game when a team needing a touchdown with only time on the clock for one more play attempts to avoid being tackled by passing to any teammate behind him that may advance the ball. A common trick play called the hook and ladder combines the two - a short forward pass is thrown, with the player catching the pass immediately throwing a lateral to a trailing teammate who is hopefully unnoticed by defensive players. Laterals are also seen in pitch or pitchout plays, where the quarterback tosses the ball to a back behind him, rather than handing it off.

There is also a minor distinction in what constitutes a forward or backward pass in the two sports. In rugby league (as in rugby union), a pass is considered forward (and thus illegal) if the person catching the ball is ahead of the player throwing it. In American football, a pass is considered forward only if the path of the ball itself has a forward component to it. For instance, the Music City Miracle (a play in which the receiving end of a lateral pass was ahead of the person throwing it, but the path was not forward) was a legal lateral in American football but would have been an illegal forward pass had it been attempted in rugby.

In both codes, if the ball is caught by an opposition player this results in an interception and possession changes hands.

== Tackles and blocks ==
In both games it is permitted to bring down the player in possession of the ball and prevent them making forward progress. Play then restarts from the next down or tackle. In rugby league, it is common for the player in possession to 'off-load' the ball, passing out of the tackle (before forward progress is halted) in order not to use up a tackle and to keep the play alive. This is much less common in American football, where the lateral pass is most commonly used as a desperation strategy when trailing near the end of a game.

In American football, as a tactic within an offensive play, designated offensive position players are assigned to 'block' defensive players, by projecting the front of their body forward into the front or side of the defensive player, in order to impede the ability of the defensive player to tackle the ball carrier. A complicated set of rules, however well-understood by the players, coaches and officials, determines the legality of the block. Illegal blocks, when observed by the officials, are flagged for penalties that vary in their severity, depending upon the particular infraction. Blocks are not permitted in rugby league and would be considered 'obstruction', resulting in a penalty.

== Scoring ==
A touchdown is the American football equivalent of rugby league's try. Despite the names, a try requires the ball to be 'touched down' to the ground, whereas a touchdown doesn't. In American football it is sufficient for the player carrying the ball to cause the ball to enter the end zone (in-goal area) while still in bounds, by carrying it in or holding the ball in or through the imaginary plane of the goal line. In rugby league the ball must be pressed to the ground in the in-goal area. An American football touchdown scores six points and a rugby league try is worth four points.

In both games, following a try / touchdown, there is the opportunity to score additional points by kicking the ball between the posts and over the bar. In American football this is called an extra point or a "point after touchdown" (PAT) in the NFL (worth 1 point); in rugby league it is known as a conversion (worth 2 points). There are two key differences between an extra point and a conversion: conversions cannot be charged down like an extra point attempt and they must be taken from the same position as the try was scored. Hence, it is important to score under the posts rather than in the corner, which makes for a difficult kick. Rugby league has no equivalent to American football's two-point conversion, in which the scoring team chooses not to kick at goal, but attempt a second touchdown from short range.

In American football teams often opt to attempt a field goal (worth 3 points) rather than attempt a touchdown. The rugby league equivalent, also called a field goal, is worth only one point and is much less common. The key difference between a field goal in the two sports is that an American football field goal attempt is normally kicked with a teammate holding the ball, whereas in rugby league the field goal is attempted using a drop-kick.

A similar concept in rugby league is the penalty goal. Following the award of the penalty, the attacking team may opt to kick for goal rather than advance the ball by hand or punting. This scores 2 points in league. The penalty goal is similar to a field goal in American football in that the ball is kicked from the ground and may be held by a teammate (although almost never is), but it cannot be charged down. The nearest equivalent in American football is the rarely used fair catch kick.

American football has one further method of scoring which does not exist in rugby league. If a ball carrier is tackled in their own endzone (in-goal area) with the ball or steps out the back of the end zone with the ball, this results in a safety which scores 2 points for the opposing team. In rugby league this does not result in any points but causes the team in possession to kick the ball back to the opposition from under the posts.

== Cross Code Matches ==
At least one cross-code match between American football and rugby league has been played. On August 1, 2009 the Jacksonville Axemen of the AMNRL played the Jacksonville Knights of the Florida Football Alliance. The first half was played under American football rules, the second half was played under rugby league rules. The score at half-time was Jacksonville Axemen 6 - Jacksonville Knights 27. The final score was Jacksonville Axemen 38 - Jacksonville Knights 27.

== See also ==
- Comparison of rugby league and rugby union
- Comparison of American football and rugby union
- Comparison of Canadian and American football
- Comparison of Canadian football and rugby league
- Players who have converted from one football code to another
