= Comparison of American football and rugby union =

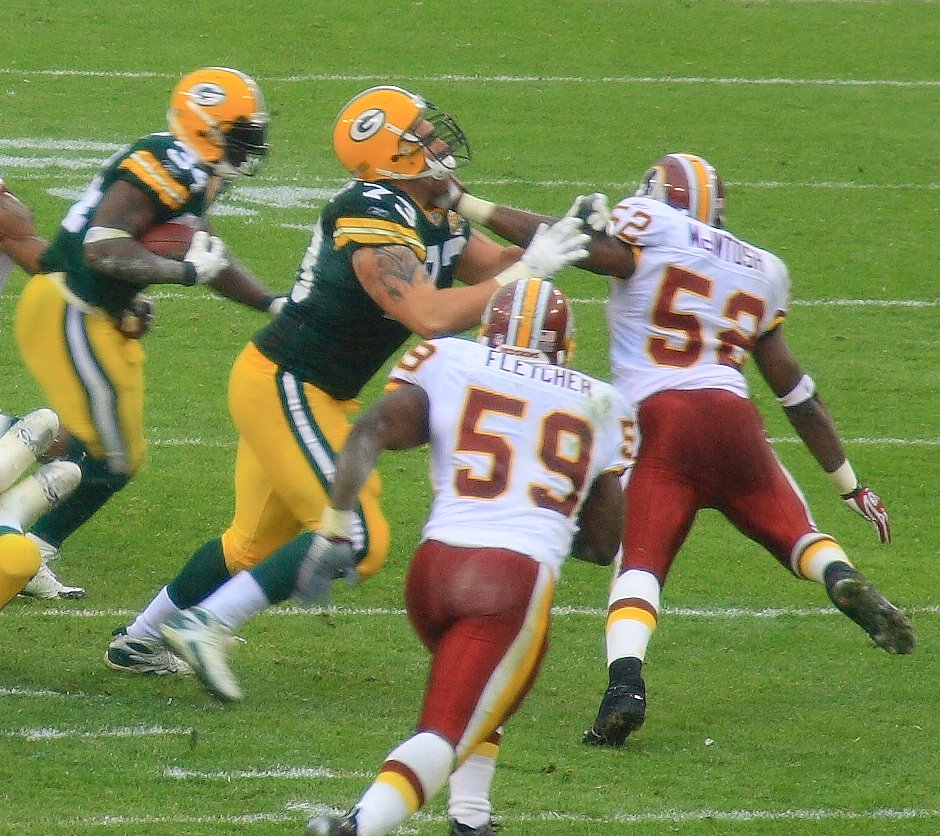
An American football professional game in 2007 showing the ball carrier running behind his offensive lineman; he may lateral to avoid a tackle, but this is exceptionally rare as possession is generally guaranteed and a lateral that is fumbled or not recovered by a teammate is likely to result in a turnover

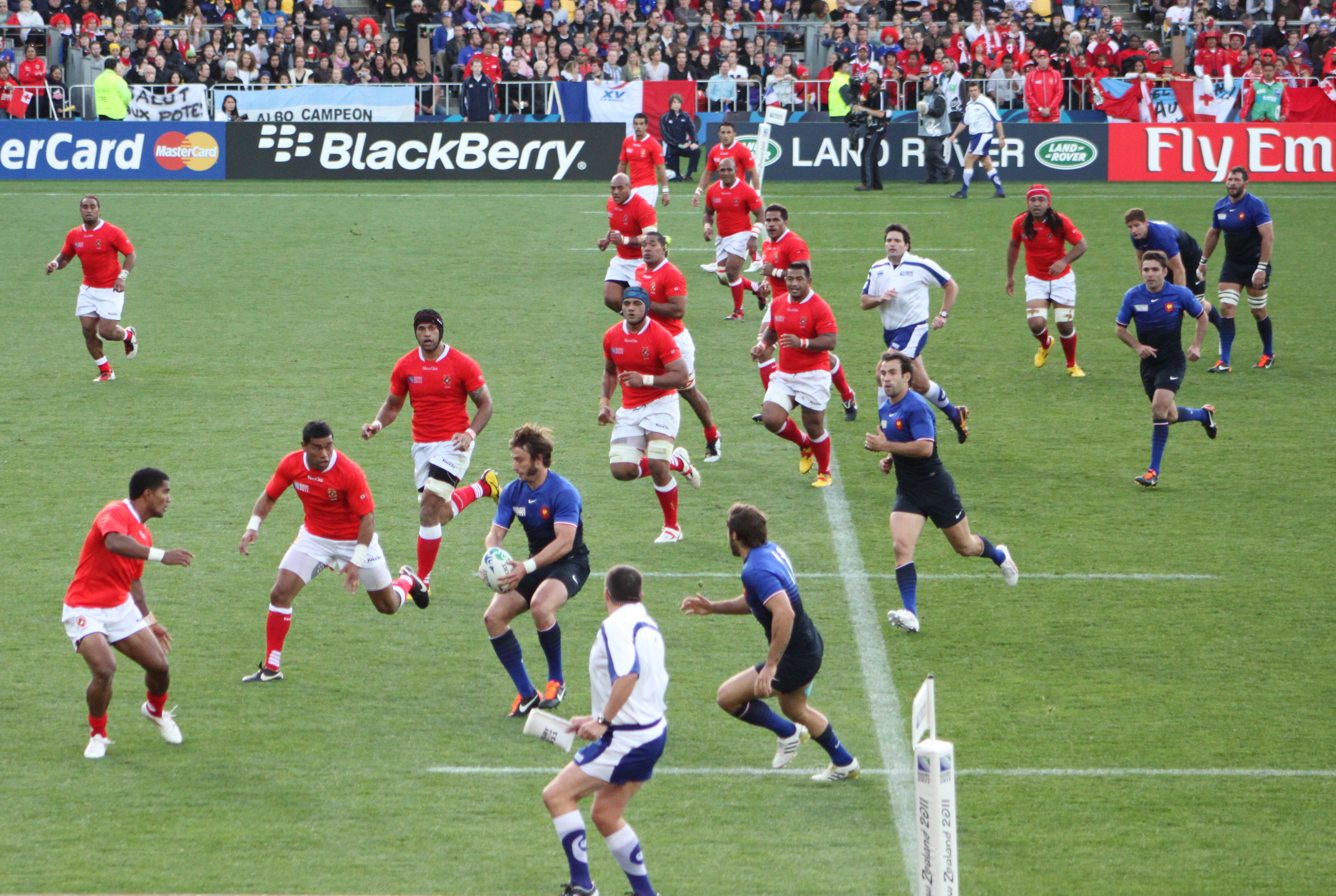
A rugby union match from the 2011 World Cup showing the sport's distinguishing feature: the ball carrier leads his team up-field, passing backwards in the event of a tackle

A comparison of American football and rugby union is possible because of the games' shared origins, despite their dissimilarities.

== Rules ==
=== Tackle ===
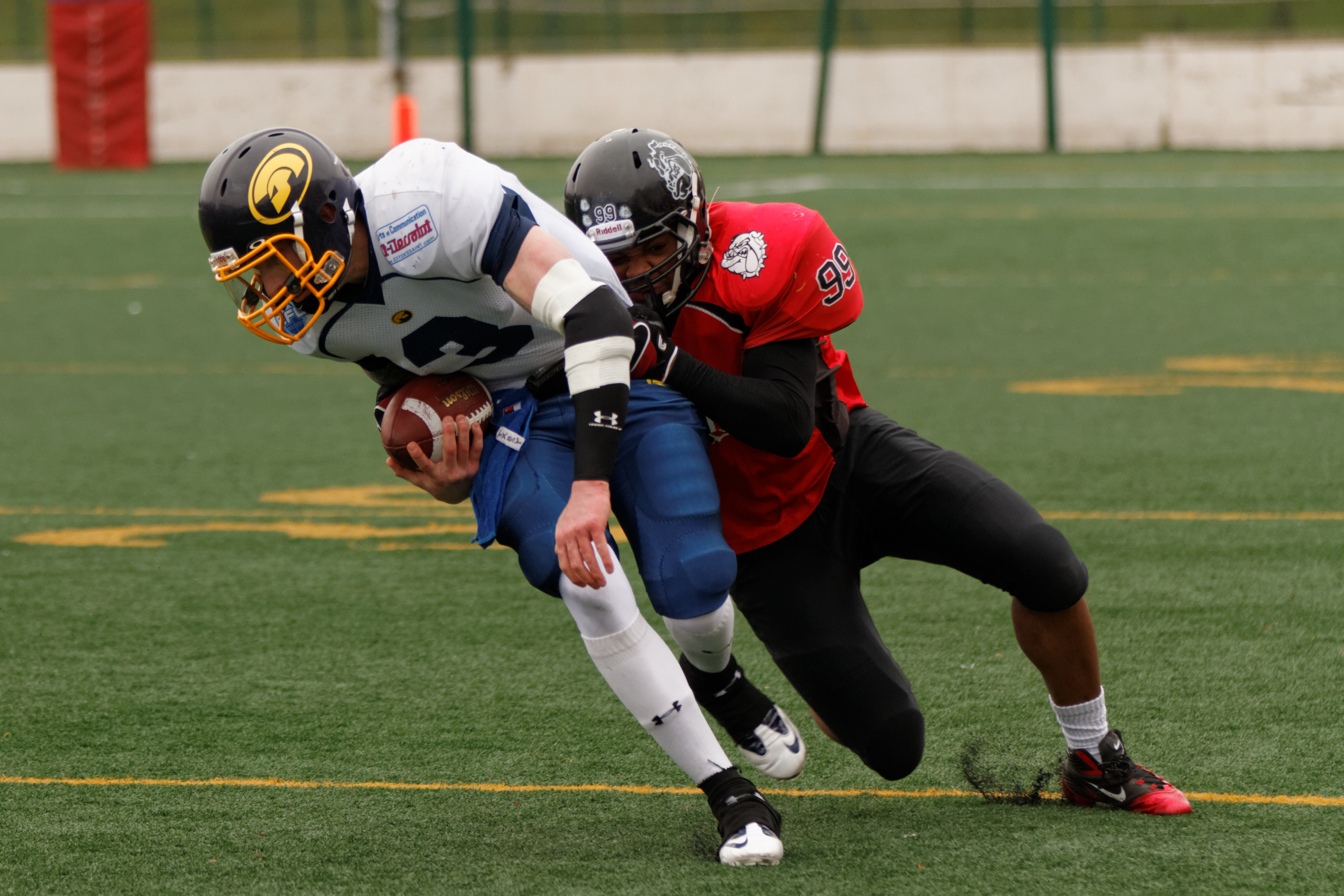
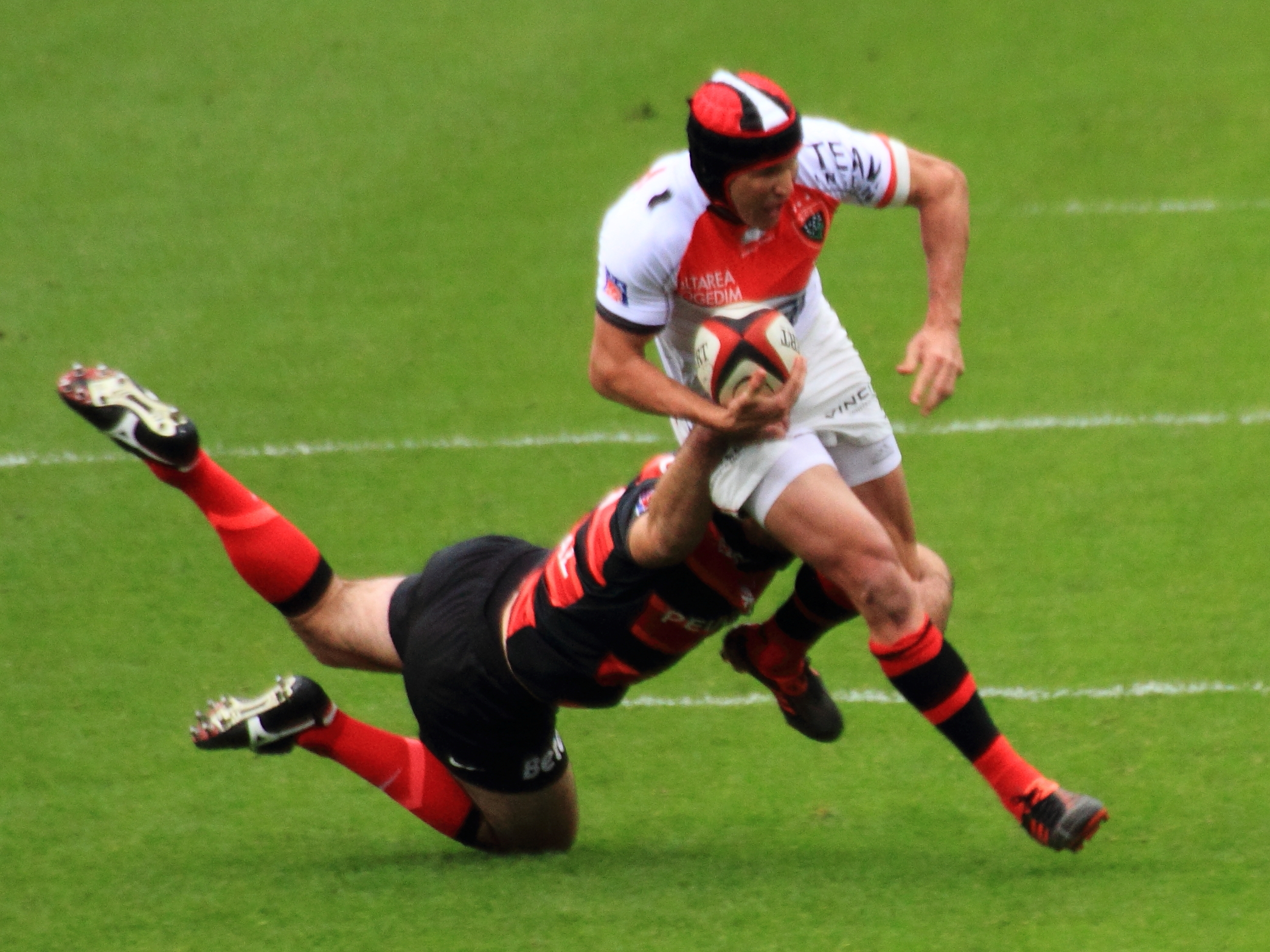
Tackle in American football (left) and rugby union

In the event of a tackle in rugby the player may pass the ball behind him provided he is not on the ground. If the tackled player is on the ground, the ball must be released, allowing any other player (including the opposition) to pick up the ball (usually a ruck forms) and the play continues. In the event of a tackle in American Football the play is concluded and the team on offense maintains possession usually if either the ball was advanced past the first down marker (resulting in a first down and a renewal of the down count) or else the down count advances (although if the play was the fourth down play and the ball is not advanced past the first down marker then the defensive team would gain possession).

=== Forward pass ===
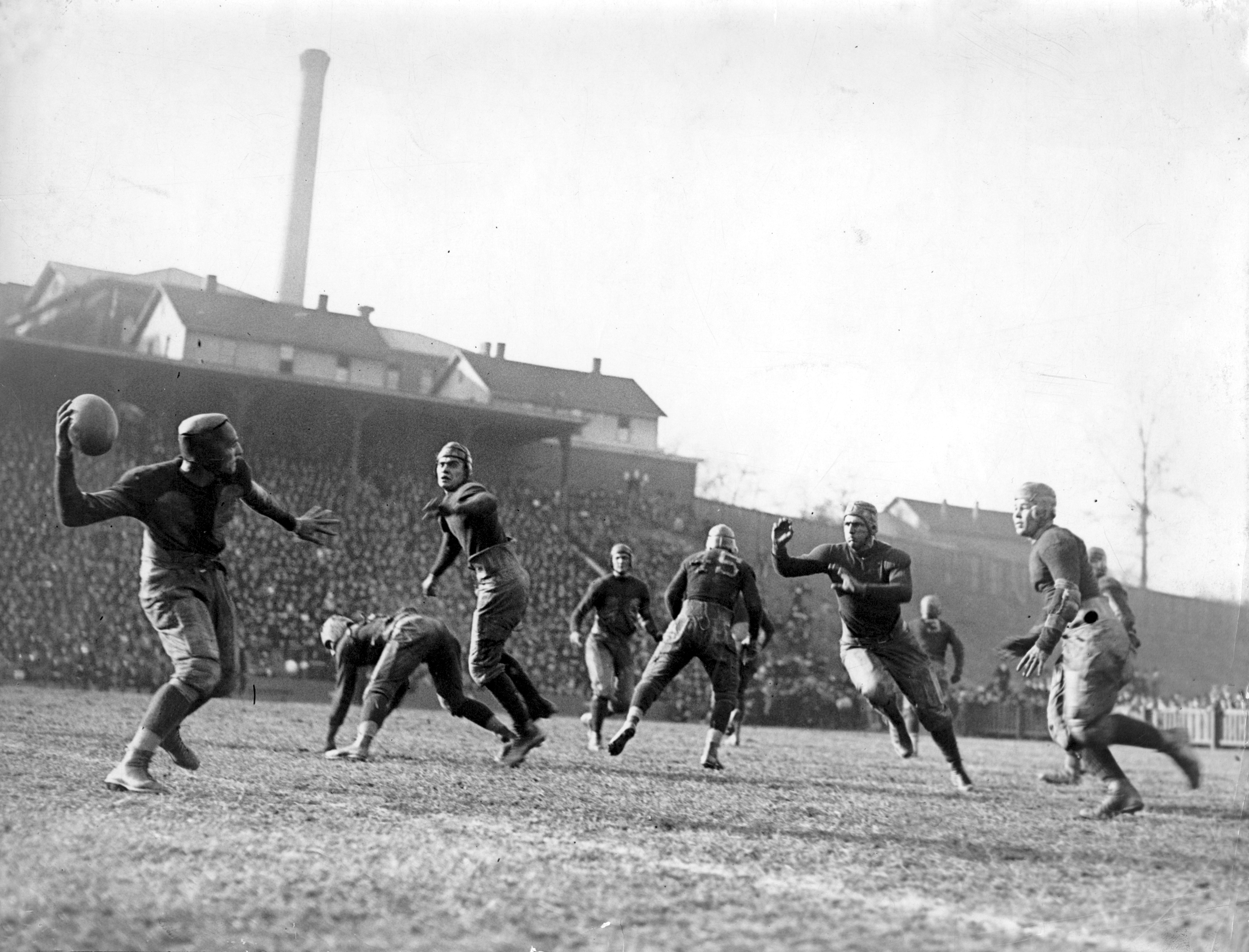
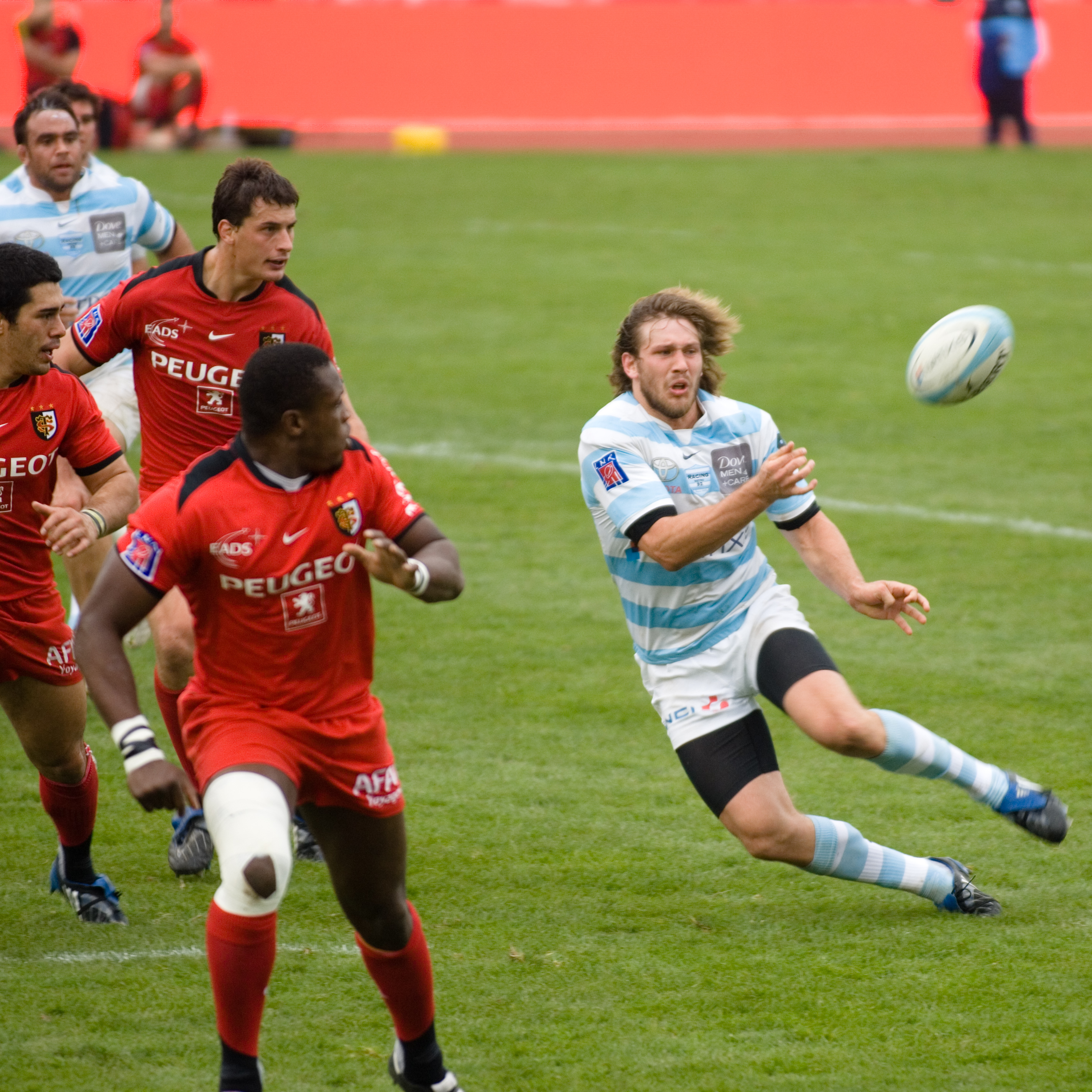
Forward pass is allowed in American football (left) but forbidden in rugby union, in which the ball must be passed behind of the player who moves it

In rugby union, it is against the rules to throw (pass) the ball in a forward direction (towards opponents in-goal area): a player in a position to receive such a pass would in most cases be offside anyway. In American football, a player behind the line of scrimmage (most often the quarterback) is permitted to throw the ball forward from behind the line of scrimmage, provided that only one forward pass may be attempted during each play. A player can attempt a forward pass if he has already received a backwards pass, provided he stays behind the line of scrimmage.

=== Composition of teams ===
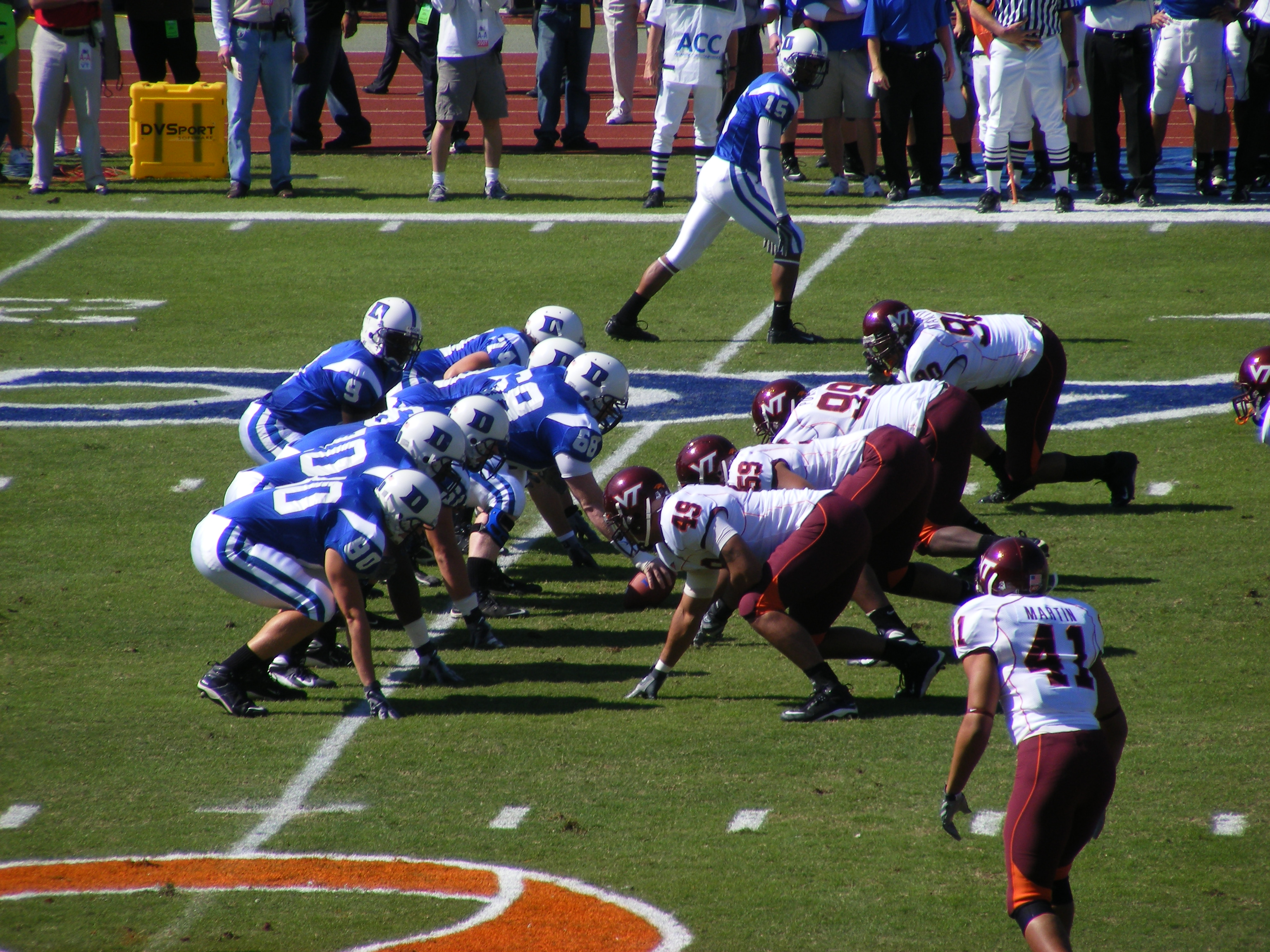
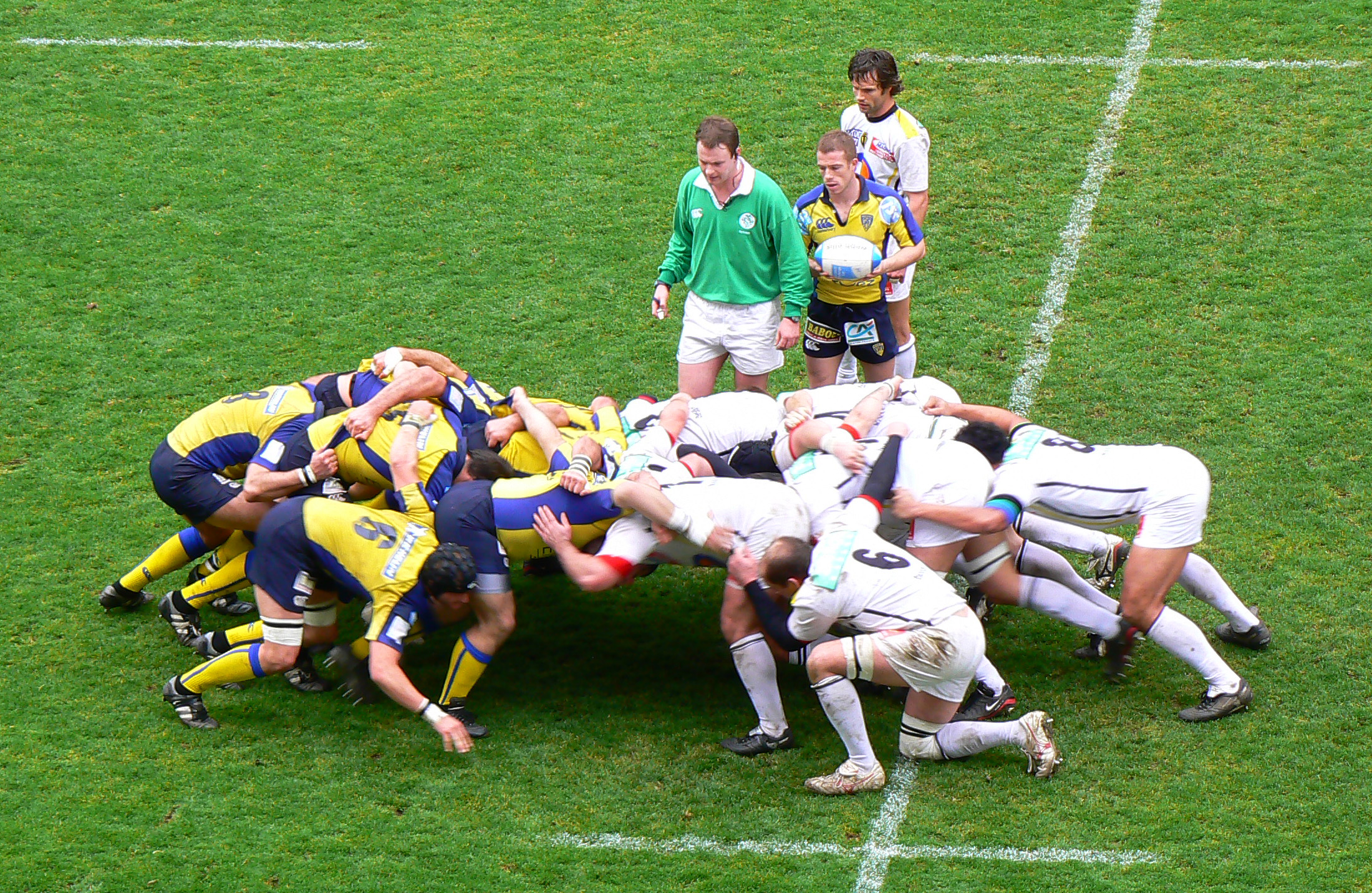
Line of scrimmage in American football (left) and scrum in rugby union (right)

Professional and most scholastic American football team play has evolved from a single team with all players except limited substitutions playing the entire game, to a specialized "platoon" system consisting of three separate units (offensive, defensive, and "special teams" used for kicking and punting) with only one of the three being on the field at a time. That is to say that in professional American football, the majority of players play in only one specialization (or "one side of the ball") – however, every player is eligible to play in any specialization.

In rugby the teams are divided into eight forwards and seven backs. Both groups of players participate in attacking and defensive plays and are on the pitch at the same time. Only the eight forwards take part in the "set pieces", which are ways to contest ball possession when there is a minor rule infringement or the ball passes out of bounds. These set pieces are scrums and line outs. A person's build and skill set determines which group they can play in. All forwards must be heavy and strong to scrummage well but not so heavy that they are too slow to partake in attacking plays. The backs are lighter and faster and include the expert kickers. The forwards numbered 1 to 8 are the players that need to have good all-round rugby skills as well as speed and strength. In professional rugby there are very few players who can play equally well in a variety of positions and most will play in the same position from youth. Every position in rugby has its own unique name (except for number 8) and associated skill base.

In most club and schoolhouse rugby union, the majority of players play both offense and defense, only being substituted for injury. Substitutes in American football can return to the game at any stoppage in play. In rugby union, any player substituted off for any reason, except for a 'blood' injury, is prohibited from returning to the field of play (with the possible exception of front-row forwards). Rugby teams may make up to seven substitutions. Each team must field 15 players at the start of each match. Players who are bleeding may receive medical treatment off pitch and are replaced until they have stopped bleeding. If the bleeding has not stopped after 15 minutes of "real time", the player will be permanently substituted. This can be down to officials' discretion, depending at which level the sport is played, where only minor medical assistance is needed to make the player fit to return to the field of play. Ejected players in American football can be replaced with a substitute.

In rugby union there are two different punishments. A yellow card can be shown for lesser infringements, which leads to the player being off the pitch for 10 minutes whilst the team will play with one less player for that duration. For more serious offenses, such as eye gouging or stamping in some cases, players can be shown a red card, which means they are off the pitch for the rest of the match and the team plays the rest of the match with 14 players. Players who are red carded automatically face a disciplinary hearing, and can be banned for a period of time from one week to permanently depending on the level of offence. Also, in a televised match, rugby union players can be "cited" (by an independent citing commissioner) for an act of foul play for which the referee did not send the player off. This means that players who committed an act of foul play which the referee did not see, or was more serious than the referee thought, still face a disciplinary panel and possible suspension.

In American football, players are only disqualified for Unsportsmanlike Conduct and related penalties (Fighting, Palpably Unfair Acts, etc.). Players sent off in this fashion must be replaced with another member of the team for the remainder of the game. In addition, disqualified players may be fined (in the NFL) and/or suspended (at all levels) for future games.

=== Duration of game ===
A rugby union game is divided into two halves of 40 minutes (or shorter for lower-grade games, and breaks given halfway through each half if playing conditions are considered to be extreme) separated by a half time period of up to 15 minutes in an international match. Most notably, a rugby union game will continue after the scheduled end of a half (half-time or full-time) until the ball becomes dead - any occurrence that would have play restart with a scrum or lineout, or when a team scores. This has led to some "nail-biting" finishes where teams losing by only a small margin work their way towards scoring, and games can go on several minutes over time. Something similar can occur at the end of either half in American football, though usually for only a few seconds of additional time, because a play that begins before the half expires continues until the ball is dead regardless of whether there is any time left on the clock. In both sports, the clock is also stopped during substitutions and for injuries, so the referee does not need to add stoppage time as is done in soccer. American football games are made up of four quarters of 15 minutes each (less at the high school and youth levels), but the clock stops and starts according to specific rules, so that a 15-minute quarter lasts much longer.

In the televised version of American football (both professional and major college level), the duration of such stoppages is often extended to accommodate the airing of commercial advertisements; this does not occur outside of the televised environment, where breaks in play are comparable to those in rugby union. In addition to this, the half-time break is typically 12 to 15 minutes; this intermission allows for resetting of strategy in both rugby and American football and adjusting to the opponent's schemes. During the American football halftime period, entertainment is provided for the fans in attendance, ranging from marching band performances in high school and college games to big-name entertainment for the Super Bowl (which usually has a longer-than-normal halftime in order to set up and break down whatever stage the halftime performer(s) will use). The entertainment in rugby varies from club to club but often includes kicking competitions involving members of the crowd, or youth rugby teams playing quick tournament games. Teams in the Super Rugby competition in the Southern Hemisphere often have mascots; however, very few rugby union teams have cheerleaders.

=== Game play ===
In both sports, the essence of the game is to carry the ball over the opponent's goal line (Rugby requires the ball to be placed on the ground with downward pressure to score). In both sports the ball may be passed backwards an unlimited number of times, but in American football the ball may be passed forward once (and only once) as long as the passer is behind the line of scrimmage, as opposed to rugby union, where the ball cannot be passed forward but only kicked or carried forward. Even when kicked, only the kicker or players behind the kicker are allowed to catch or interfere with play.

In both sports, play is stopped when the ball goes out of bounds, when a player or team commits a foul or after any scoring play. In American football, play is also stopped when a player is ruled down or when a forward pass falls incomplete.

The forward pass and the stoppage when a player with the ball is downed results in short plays and a generally episodic game play in American football, as opposed to the longer and more fluid passages of play found in rugby union. If a player in rugby is tackled then the ball must be released and any player arriving at the scene may pick up the ball and run with it. If two or more opposing players arrive at the same time then a ruck is formed and the players push each other to get at the ball before play continues.

In rugby, kicking during the flow of the game is done for tactical reasons (both offensive and defensive) or to score a goal. If the ball is recovered by the kicking team, it can lead to significant improvement in field position. It is also legal in rugby to kick at goal at any point in the game. This is called a drop goal. In American football, a team that kicks the ball during play automatically gives up possession and cannot recover the ball unless an error in catching the ball (drop), or while running after catching (fumble) is made by the receiving team; because of this, punting is typically done only when teams do not expect to be able to retain possession (i.e. on fourth down). Additionally, rule changes made in the late twentieth century mandated that field goals cannot be made in front of the line of scrimmage; this has led to the demise of the drop-kick field goal in American football. Catching (or recovering) and blocking kicked balls are integral skills in rugby as well as in American football.

== Origins ==
Various forms of football have been played in Britain for centuries with different villages and schools having their own traditional rules.

The Football Association was formed in England in October 1863. Differences of opinion about the proposed laws led to the formation of the first governing body for rugby, the Rugby Football Union (RFU) in 1871. Laws were drawn up for rugby football which was now distinct from association football (soccer).

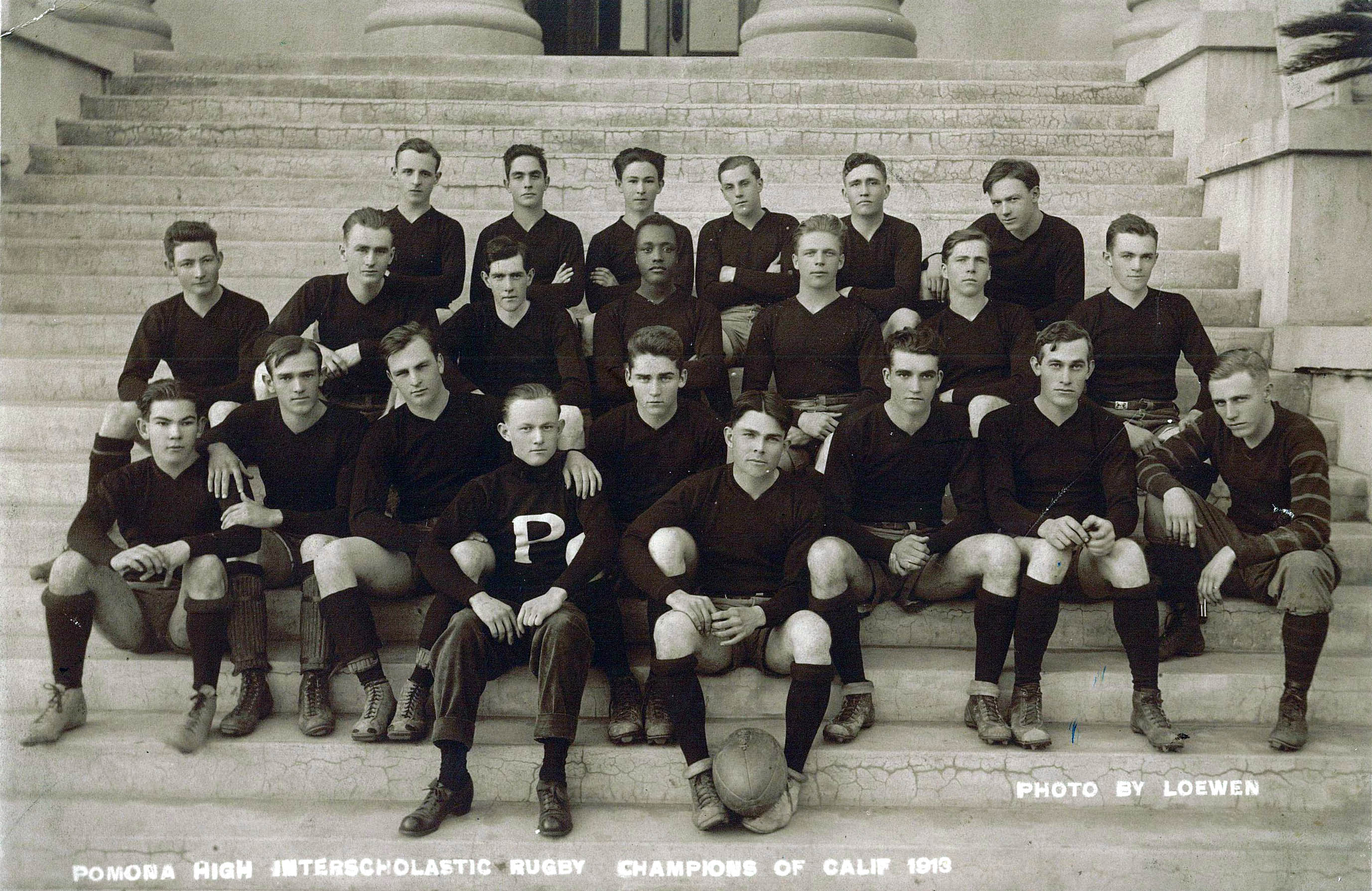
Pomona University rugby union team, champion of California. Concerned by the violence of American football, rugby union was played by Californian universities instead of it during 1906–14

In 1872 rugby clubs were established in the San Francisco Bay Area, which were composed mainly of British expatriates. The first recorded rugby match in the United States occurred on May 14, 1874 between Harvard University in Cambridge, Massachusetts and McGill University of Montreal, Quebec when McGill challenged Harvard to a game using rules in place at the Montreal campus.

In 1876, Yale, Harvard, Princeton, and Columbia formed the Intercollegiate Football Association, a competition based on the traditional rules of rugby. The sport of American football evolved from these intercollegiate games (see History of American football).

Back in England, a schism developed between those who favoured amateurism (southern English teams) and those who felt that players should be compensated for time taken off work to play rugby (northern teams). In 1895, this resulted in the formation of a break-away governing body, the Northern Union. The schism in English rugby was caused by several economic factors for the northern clubs which made up the majority of the teams. The Northern Union began to make changes to the laws of rugby in 1906, which resulted in the sport of rugby league. The Rugby Football Union's version of rugby became known as rugby union after its governing body.

The history of American football can be traced to early versions of rugby football and association football, with several important early divergences, most notably the rule changes instituted in 1880 by Walter Camp, a Hopkins School and Yale University graduate, considered to be the father of American football. The popularity of college football grew as it became the dominant version of the sport in the United States for the first half of the twentieth century.

American professional football began in 1892 with a game pitting the Allegheny Athletic Association against the Pittsburgh Athletic Club. The American Professional Football Association formed in 1920 and changed its name to the National Football League (NFL) two years later. Initially a sport of Midwestern industrial towns in the United States, professional football eventually became a national phenomenon.

The modern era of American football began at the 1932 NFL Playoff game, where several key innovations were first introduced, such as hash marks, forward passes from any location behind the line of scrimmage and the placement of the goal posts to the goal line. Further evolution in play strategy, tactics and rule development occurred throughout the 1930s. Notable events such as the American football game held at the 1932 Summer Olympics and the American football game at 1933 World's Fair led to the first college All-Star game in 1934, which, in turn, served as an important factor in the growth of professional football in the United States. American football's explosion in popularity during the second half of the twentieth century can be traced to the 1958 NFL Championship Game, a contest generally thought of in American football history as the greatest game ever played. A rival league to the NFL, the American Football League (AFL), began playing in 1960. The subsequent pressure placed upon the NFL from its rival led to a merger between the two leagues in 1967. The new organization from this merger retained the NFL name, but was structured with two new conferences known as the National Football Conference (NFC) and the American Football Conference, with teams distributed between the two mainly along the same lines as the former NFL and AFL.

== Field ==
=== Dimensions ===
The dimensions of an American football field are measured in United States customary units (essentially the same as British Imperial units). Rugby union originally marked and quoted its measurements in Imperial but converted to Metric units in 1977. When these conversions were made the measurements were generally adjusted to the closest round-number measurement in the metric system.

Although both codes are played on similar sized rectangular fields, the dimensions of rugby union fields can vary up to a maximum size that is larger than the fixed size of American football fields. Rugby union fields are limited to a maximum length of 144 metres (157 yd) long (100 metres (110 yd) between goal lines) and width of 70 metres (77 yd), while American football fields have a fixed length of 120 yards (110 m) (100 yards (91 m) between goal lines) and a width of 160 feet (49 m). The end zone in American football has a fixed depth of 10 yards (9.1 m) whilst in Rugby Union the goal area must be between a minimum depth of 10 metres (11 yd) and a maximum of 22 metres (24 yd) between the goal line and the dead ball line at the rear of the field.

=== Lines ===
==== Boundary lines ====
An American football "field" is bordered by "sidelines" and "end lines". A rugby union "pitch" has "touchlines" and "dead-ball lines", respectively. True to its rugby roots, the boundary lines in American football are also out of play (unlike in the majority of other sports where being in contact with the line means that the player or ball is still in-play).

==== Major interior lines ====
In both rugby and American football all the major interior lines run transversely across the playing area.

The border between the regular field of play and a scoring zone in both sports is called the goal line (though it is more commonly referred to as the try line in rugby union).

The playing field of rugby is divided into halves by a halfway line. An American football field has a 50 yard line which is sometimes referred to as the midfield line. On an American football field there are a further 18 solid yard lines crossing the field, marked at 5 yards (4.6 m) intervals between each goal-line and the 50 yard line. These lines are named for the distance that they are from the nearest goal line, for example 5 yard line, 10 yard line, 35 yard line, etc. Rugby union pitches have only two further solid lines called the 22 metre lines. They are so called because they are marked 22 metres (24 yd) from the goal lines. This unusual distance exists because rugby changed from Imperial units to Metric units in 1977; the line had previously been a 25-yard-line. The metric equivalent of 25 yards is 22.86 metres which should round to 23 metres; some sources argue that the reason for rounding down to 22 was to further restrict players within the 1968 25-yard line kicking law; a rule that had been introduced to encourage more running play.

In rugby, the kickoff to begin each half and restarts after scores are taken from the halfway line whereas in American football these can be taken from the 30, 35 or 40 yard line depending on if it is a college, NFL or high-school game. The yard lines of American football are vitally important during game play because a team's advance is measured against them which, in turn, determines possession of the ball. The 22 metre lines in rugby union effectively divide the field into approximate quarters (though not always as rugby pitches vary in size; the total length of the field of play must not exceed 100m but can be shorter than that if space is limited). The 22 metre lines determine the position from which drop-outs are taken and also mark the limit where a defending player may kick-the ball directly (without bouncing) into touch without losing the ground gained by the kick.

==== Minor transverse interior lines ====
In American football there is a 2 yard line (for NFL 2-point conversions), 15 yard line (for NFL 1-point conversions) or 3 yard line (college and high-school) which is sometimes called the PAT (point after touchdown) line. This is a short line marked the appropriate distance from the goal line directly in front of the posts and is where the line of scrimmage forms when one team has scored and is attempting a conversion. In rugby union there are two broken lines that cross the whole pitch marked ten metres either side of the halfway line. These are called the 10 metre lines and mark the minimum distance restart kicks must travel and the forward limit of where the receiving team can stand to receive these kicks.

In American football there are also four hash marks (one near each side line and a pair either side of the longitudinal center of the field) marked every yard between the major transverse lines. Though these technically run across the pitch they can more usefully be regarded as longitudinal lines because each hash mark is only a yard long and they are so numerous that they create more obvious pattern down the field than across it (see below).

In rugby union there is a line five metres from the goal line indicated by a series of six short dashes marked 5 metres in from touch, 15 metres in from touch and directly in front of each post (these are frequently called the five metre line though they technically have no name the 5 metre lines are longitudinal lines 5 metres in from touch). These are marked to assist the referee because no set-piece (scrum or line-out) may take place within five metres of the goal line.

==== Minor longitudinal interior lines ====
As described above, in American football there are four longitudinal lines made up of yard-long hashes. These hash marks are marked at one yard intervals between each yard line and parallel to them. They further assist the umpires to determine how far the ball has been advanced each down and the central pair also mark the widest point at which any play may be initiated; all plays start with the ball on or between the middle pair of hash marks. In professional football these central hash marks are the same width as the goalposts (18 feet, 6 inches wide), in college football they are 40 feet apart and in high school football they are 53 feet, 4 inches apart.

In rugby there are four longitudinal dotted lines. Two are marked 5 metres in from the touch lines and two a further ten metres in. These are the 5 metre lines and 15 metre lines respectively. These are used to determine where players making up the line-out are allowed to stand before the throw-in. The five metre line also assists the referee because scrums may not be set within five metres of the touch line.

Both codes also have goalposts at each end of the field: on the goal-line in the case of rugby union; but further back in American football on the back of the end zone.

American football goalposts were formerly H-shaped and were located on the goal line, but; in 1967, the NFL adopted the current modern offset-fork design, made from extruded steel pipes. The goalposts currently consist of two vertical posts 18.5 feet (5.6 m) apart (24 feet (7.3 m) in high school football) rising from a horizontal crossbar, which is mounted on a single central support post that raises the crossbar to a height of 10 feet (3.0 m), resulting in a two-tined fork shape. The central vertical post is offset from the crossbar toward the rear, placing it as far as possible from the field of play; it is also usually padded to minimize collision-related injuries. In 1974, in the effort to create a safer, unimpeded field of play in the end zone, calculated to produce more passing touchdowns, the NFL relocated the goalposts from the goal line to the end line.

Rugby union goalposts are 5.6 metres (18 ft) apart and extend vertically from the ground being connected by a crossbar at 3 metres (9.8 ft), creating an H-shape. In both cases, only kicks passing between the uprights and above the crossbar score points. The scoring areas of both types of goalposts are technically infinite as there is no top boundary.

== Advancing the ball ==
In American football, the team that is in possession of the ball, the offense, has four downs to advance the ball 10 yards towards the opponent's end zone. If the offense gains 10 yards, it gets another set of four downs. If the offense fails to gain 10 yards after four downs, it loses possession of the ball.

The ball is put into play by a snap. All players line up facing each other at or behind the line of scrimmage. One offensive player, the center, then passes (or "snaps") the ball between his legs to a teammate, usually the quarterback.

Players can then advance the ball in two ways:

- By running with the ball, also known as rushing. One ball-carrier can hand the ball to another; this is known as a handoff. A ball-carrier can also perform a lateral or backward pass as in rugby.
- By passing the ball forwards to a teammate as long as the passer is behind the line of scrimmage.

A down ends, and the ball becomes dead, after any of the following:

- The player with the ball is tackled.
- A forward pass goes out of bounds or touches the ground before it is caught. This is known as an incomplete pass. The ball is returned to the original line of scrimmage for the next down.
- The ball or the player with the ball goes out of bounds.
- A team scores.

Rugby union is based on the 'right to contest possession'. A team is not required to surrender possession when the ball carrier is tackled, in contrast to American football, where a team must surrender their possession when a player is tackled and no downs remain. Rugby union players must win possession in open play, unless the team in possession makes an infringement, scores, or the ball leaves the field of play.

A team in rugby union can advance the ball in two ways:

- By running forward with the ball. The ball carrier typically passes to a teammate just before he is tackled, to permit another player to continue the run towards the try line, thus quickly gaining ground. The ball carrier cannot pass to any teammate that is closer to the try line. This would be a forward pass, which is illegal. The player may also attempt to form a maul and push their way to the try line.
- By kicking the ball forwards and attempting to recover it. Only the kicker or players behind the kicker are allowed to recover the ball otherwise it is classed as a forward pass and a penalty awarded (illegal in American Football, unless the ball is first touched by another player). It is also possible to keep the ball within a scrum (with the feet) & push the opposition backwards. This is normally only attempted when a scrum has been set very close to the oppositions try line.

In rugby the method of attack is typically decided by the person in the number ten jersey (the flyhalf). Once the forwards gain possession of the ball after a scrum, line out or ruck the ball is usually passed to this player who is the midpoint between the forwards and the backs. He/she must read the opposition's defensive strategy and calls a play accordingly, either running, passing or kicking to other players. After the set piece or ruck the no.10 is the first player who has time to control the play and must therefore be an expert at a wide variety of kicks and an expert passer. The rule differences mean that there are a wider variety of kicks and kicking strategies in rugby compared to American football.

Possession may change in different ways in both games:

1. When the ball is kicked to the opposing team; this can be done at any time but it is normal to punt on the last down in American football when out of field goal range.
2. Following an unsuccessful kick at goal.
3. When an opposing player intercepts a pass.
4. When the player in possession drops the ball and it is recovered by an opposition player. This is called a fumble in American football.
5. In rugby union the opposition are awarded a scrum if the player in possession drops the ball forwards or makes the ball go forwards with any part of his body other than his feet and the opposition are unable to gain an advantage from the lost possession. This is called a knock-on.
6. In rugby union if the ball goes out of play, the opposition are awarded a line-out, this is called ball back. However, if the ball was kicked out of play as the result of the awarding of a penalty the team that kicked the ball out throws the ball in. Both teams can contest in a line-out.
7. In American football possession changes hands following a successful score with the scoring team kicking off to the opposition. In rugby union the team who conceded the score must kick off to the team who scored.
8. In American football, an automatic transfer of possession takes place when the team in possession runs out of downs.

In both codes, tactical kicking is an important aspect of play. In American football, it is normal to punt on the last down, but, as in rugby union, a kick can take place at any phase of play.

== Passing ==
In American football, the offense can throw the ball forward once on a play from behind the line of scrimmage. The forward pass is a distinguishing feature of American and Canadian football as it is strictly forbidden in rugby.

The ball can be thrown sideways or backwards without restriction in both games. In American football this is known as a lateral and is much less common than in rugby union. However designed laterals (often known as pitches) which take place behind the line of scrimmage are quite common in American football and are often a way that a ball is transferred from the quarterback to a running back on sweep plays or to a wide receiver on speed sweeps or a reverse.

In both codes, if the ball is caught by an opposition player this results in an interception and possession changes hands.

== Tackles and blocks ==
In both games it is permitted to bring down the player in possession of the ball and prevent him or her from making forward progress. In rugby, unlike in American football, the ball is still in play. Players from either team can take possession of the ball. The tackled player must present the ball (once on the ground, places the ball out on the ground facing their team) so that open play can continue.

Rugby union rules do not allow tackles above the plane of the shoulders. Only the player who has possession of the ball can be tackled. The attacker must also attempt to wrap his or her arms around the player being tackled: merely pushing the player being tackled to ground with a shoulder is illegal. If a maul or ruck is formed, a player may not "ram" into the formation without first binding to the players.

In American football, tacklers are not required to wrap their arms around the ball carrier before bringing him to the ground; in fact, the ball carrier is often "tackled" by the defender taking a running start and hitting the ball carrier to knock him to the ground. Tackles can also be made by grabbing the ball carrier's jersey and pulling him to the ground (though pulling down a ball carrier from behind by the pads or jersey behind his neck is known as a "horse collar", a move now illegal at all levels of the American game). If a ball carrier is stopped for more than a few seconds, the referee can blow the whistle, declare the player's forward progress stopped, and end the play even though the ball carrier is not actually tackled to the ground.

In American football, as a tactic within an offensive play, designated offensive position players are assigned to 'block' defensive players, by projecting the front of their body forward into the front or side of the defensive player, in order to impede the ability of the defensive player to tackle the ball carrier. A complicated set of rules, however well-understood by the players, coaches and officials, determines the legality of the block. Illegal blocks, when observed by the officials, are flagged for penalties that vary in their severity, depending upon the particular infraction. Blocks are not permitted in rugby union and would be considered 'obstruction', resulting in a penalty.

== Scoring ==
A touchdown is the American football equivalent of the rugby try. Unlike American football, both codes of rugby require the ball to be grounded, whereas in American football it is sufficient for the ball to enter the end zone (in-goal area) when in the possession of a player. In American football a touchdown scores 6 points; in rugby union a try is worth 5 points; and 4 points in rugby league.

Rugby also allows for a penalty try, awarded by the referee when he believes that a try has been prevented by the defending team's misconduct. In comparison, American football allows the referee to declare that a "Palpably unfair act" was committed by the defending team: the referee is allowed in such a situation (at his discretion) to award a score (most commonly a touchdown) or other penalty (in amateur play, including forfeiture of the game). In practice, however, such a call is extremely rare and limited to extreme circumstances, such as a player who was not in the game at the start of the play running off of the sidelines and tackling the player with the ball, as was the case in the 1954 Cotton Bowl Classic. In high school football, this can also be called if the defense commits repeated and intentional fouls at the goal line.

In both games, following a try / touchdown, there is the opportunity to score additional points by kicking the ball between the posts and over the bar. In American football this is called an extra point (worth 1 point); in rugby union it is known as a conversion (worth 2 points). (The result is that both the touchdown/extra point combination and the try/conversion combination, when successful, total to 7 points.) One key difference between an extra point and a conversion is that a conversion kick must be taken from a position in line with where the try was scored, although the distance from the try line from which the conversion kick is taken is not fixed. Hence, it is advantageous to ground the ball under the posts rather than in the corner which makes for a more difficult kick. Also, American football features the option of the going for a 2-point conversion, where the attacking team gets one chance from 3 yards out (2 in the NFL) to get the ball in the end zone again. This would be worth 2 points on top of the 6 already awarded for the touchdown. Plus, all American football, except high school (all but Texas), allows conversion turnovers that are returned for touchdowns to be given 2 points.

In American football teams often opt to go for a field goal (worth 3 points) rather than attempt a touchdown, either because it is fourth down and they don't want to risk a turnover or because it is late in the game and the three points will either tie the game or put the team ahead. The rugby equivalent is a drop goal (worth 3 points in union, 1 or 2 points in league). The key difference between a field goal and a drop goal is that a field goal attempt is normally kicked with a teammate holding the ball, whereas in rugby the ball must hit the ground and be kicked immediately as it touches the ground.

In American football, a field goal is generally kicked from seven yards behind the line of scrimmage, with the "holder" receiving a "long snap" from the center. This is the optimum distance for a kick to be made before the defensive team can break through the line of scrimmage to block the kick. When calculating the distance of a kick, one adds seven yards to the line of scrimmage, then adds ten more to account for the end zone (as the goal posts are in the back of the end zone) Therefore, if the line of scrimmage is the 20-yard line, a field goal taken from there would be a 37-yard kick - the ball would be set down for the kick at the 27, plus 10 yards for the end zone.

Because of the mechanics of the kick, field goals are only attempted from a very specific range. In the modern NFL any kick under 40 yards is considered very makeable and should be converted by a competent kicker. Kicks from 40-45 yards are considered more challenging, but usually makeable, kicks from the 50 yard range are considered difficult. Kicks from 55 or more yards are considered extremely difficult, and are normally only attempted in dire situations at the end of the game when the field goal would tie or win the game. The record for longest field goal is 68 yards, which has been done once by Cam Little in 2025. A 65-yard kick by Ola Kimrin was made during a preseason exhibition game in 2002, but preseason games are not included in record keeping. Notably, the 65-yard kick was made in Denver, Colorado, where the elevation is 5,280 feet (1,610 m). Tucker's record field goal was made in Allegiant Stadium, a domed stadium in Paradise, Nevada.

A similar concept in rugby is the penalty goal. Following the award of the penalty, the attacking team may opt to kick for goal rather than advance the ball by hand or punting, or forming a scrum. This scores 3 points. The penalty goal is similar to a field goal in American football in that the ball is kicked from the ground, but it cannot be charged. There is no direct equivalent to a penalty goal in American football. A rare play called a "fair catch kick" is analogous to a goal from mark which existed in rugby union at one time.

American football has one further method of scoring which does not exist in rugby. If the team with possession causes the ball to enter its own end zone, and the ball carrier is then tackled while within the end zone, then this results in a safety which scores 2 points for the non-possessing team and then requires the possessing team to give up the ball by kicking to its opponent. In rugby union this does not score any points but results in a scrum 5 meters from the try zone with the team that didn't put the ball into the in-goal area putting the ball in.

In rugby, If the ball is put past the try line by the attacking team, into the in-goal area, by means of kicking, passing or running and the receiving team grounds it or makes it dead immediately, a drop kick from the 22-metre line ensues. In American football, if a kick-off or punt lands in the end zone and the receiving team downs the ball without leaving the end zone, the result is a touchback. On a touchback, the receiving team gains possession of the ball at their own 25-yard line in both college and professional football on kickoffs and free kicks after a safety, with the NCAA having changed from the 20-yard line in 2012 and the NFL making the same change in 2018. The NCAA made a further rule change effective in its 2018 season, treating a fair catch on a kickoff, or free kick following a safety, between the receiving team's goal line and 25-yard line as a touchback. All other touchback situations in both rule sets result in possession at the 20-yard line.

An important difference between the two sports involves the aftermath of a score. In American football, the scoring team kicks off, except after a safety. In rugby union, the team conceding the score kicks off (in rugby sevens, a variant of rugby union featuring seven players per side, the scoring team kicks off).

== Players ==
In modern American football, a team consists of an offensive, a defensive and a "special" (involved in placekicking, punting, kickoffs, and kick returns) three separate teams units. Only eleven players can be on the field at any time. Players are allowed to play on more than one of the units, this is the norm for all but the highest levels of play (professional and large schools). The kicking unit, with the exception of a few specialists, will usually be made up of reserve players from the offense and defense.

In rugby union, the same players have to both defend and attack. There are fifteen players in a rugby union team (except in sevens and tens). Many of the positions in each code have similar names, but, in practice, the roles of those positions can be different. A fullback in American football is very different from a fullback in rugby. Some of the positions are fairly similar; a Rugby fly-half carries out a similar role to a quarterback in American football; however, quarterbacks touch the ball on almost every offensive play, and the fly-half also has roles similar to the running back and punter (so it's more like dual-threat quarterback or triple-threat man).

Broadly speaking, linemen and linebackers in American football correspond to forwards in rugby, and running backs, receivers, and quarterbacks have roles similar to backs in rugby.

Because of the playing time, number of pauses, number of players and the nature of the game in general, rugby players will typically need higher physical endurance than American football players while more short-term bursts of physical strength, power, and speed will be required in American football (amongst equivalent positions and weights). Collisions between players in American football tend to cause greater injury than in rugby union; in rugby union tackles must at least show an attempt to bind is made but this rule does not apply to American football. Moreover, rugby union hits are not usually at the speed of American football both because of the nature of the game and the lack of protective equipment. Additionally, rugby offsides rules and the lack of a forward pass significantly reduce the chance of a player receiving a "blind-side" hit (i.e. being hit and/or tackled from behind). In American football, players receiving a forward pass are often extremely vulnerable because they must concentrate on catching the ball, often jumping very high or stretching out and thereby exposing their body to punishing hits; in rugby a player is not allowed to be tackled in the air, leaving the receiver of the kick with more time to assess his surroundings, usually in rugby ball carriers can anticipate a hit and can brace themselves accordingly.

In rugby, the contact times between players are usually much longer, as a more wrestling approach is required to bring players down, as momentum cannot always be relied upon particularly when the lines between the teams are consistently close, not allowing for significant momentum to be developed before meeting a defender. In rugby, rucks and mauls may develop following a tackle when multiple players from each team bind together to move the ball in play (on the ground or in-hand respectively). In American football, equivalents to rucks and mauls are virtually non existent, as play normally stops when the ball is stopped but blocking and fumble have some similarities to them. These differences can be summed up in the idea that in American football the objective is to bring the player to ground or to disrupt a pass to end the play, whereas in rugby the main objective is to stop the player from breaking the line.

American football quarterbacks, linebackers, - and increasingly, their coaches - have the ability to decide what the next play would be in many occasions during the game, thus allowing for both complex tactics displayed within individual plays and overall game-wide strategy in play calling and play selection. In rugby union, the continuous nature of the game implies that there is no time to discuss team strategy, therefore offensive actions may seem to lack a definite direction for some periods of time; thus, Rugby is more impromptu, whereas American football is more premeditated.

Rugby players often continue to participate in the game long after they have left school. In America, amateurs who have left school rarely play full tackle football, but often play touch football or flag football.

== Attire ==
Rugby union players are allowed to wear modest padding on the head, shoulders and collarbone, but it must be sufficiently light, thin and compressible to meet World Rugby standards, and the vast majority of players play with only a gumshield for protection, and no armor. Protective headgear is becoming more popular with players that have a history of concussion or those who wish to protect their ears from damage (usually front or second rows). Hard plastic or metal are prohibited in rugby kit, including hard plastic shin guards. The only metal that is allowed in any rugby kit is World Rugby-approved soft aluminium studs underneath shoes.

The prohibition of metal resulted in one of the most unusual pieces of protective gear ever seen in any sport in a 2010 Heineken Cup semifinal between Biarritz and Munster. Biarritz star Imanol Harinordoquy had suffered a broken nose in a domestic encounter with Racing Métro's Sébastien Chabal, and had undergone surgery to repair it. He received approval to wear a mask to protect the injury, but had to have the frame covered by more than 2 inches (5.1 cm) of foam padding; at least one journalist likened Harinordoquy to the Man in the Iron Mask.

Often considered an essential (though not mandatory) part of the safety equipment needed for rugby is the gumshield or mouthguard. Players also have the option to use fingerless gloves which have been introduced recently to the game allowing players to better grip the ball, although it is rarely seen.

American football players wear and in general make use of much bulkier protective equipment, such as a padded plastic helmet, shoulder pads, hip pads and knee pads. These protective pads were introduced decades ago and have improved ever since to help minimize lasting injury to players. An American football helmet consists of a hard plastic top with thick padding on the inside, a facemask made of one or more metal bars, and a chinstrap used to secure the helmet. An unintended consequence of all the safety equipment has resulted in increasing levels of force in the game which, unprotected and in current form, would now be extremely dangerous. An example of this is the trend for players tackling head first rather than leading with a shoulder, which has led to some serious neck injuries, including breaks, even with the helmets used. In previous years with less padding, tackling more closely resembled tackles in rugby union, with less severe impacts and less severe structural injuries.

== See also ==
- Comparison of Canadian and American football
- Comparison of American football and rugby league
- Comparison of rugby league and rugby union
- Comparison of association football and rugby union
- American football
- Rugby union
- Players who have converted from one football code to another

== Sources ==
- HS Rugby Ban: Inattention To Safety?
- Coaching Strength or size - which is the significant component for rugby players?
