= Goal (sports) =

Method of scoring in many sports

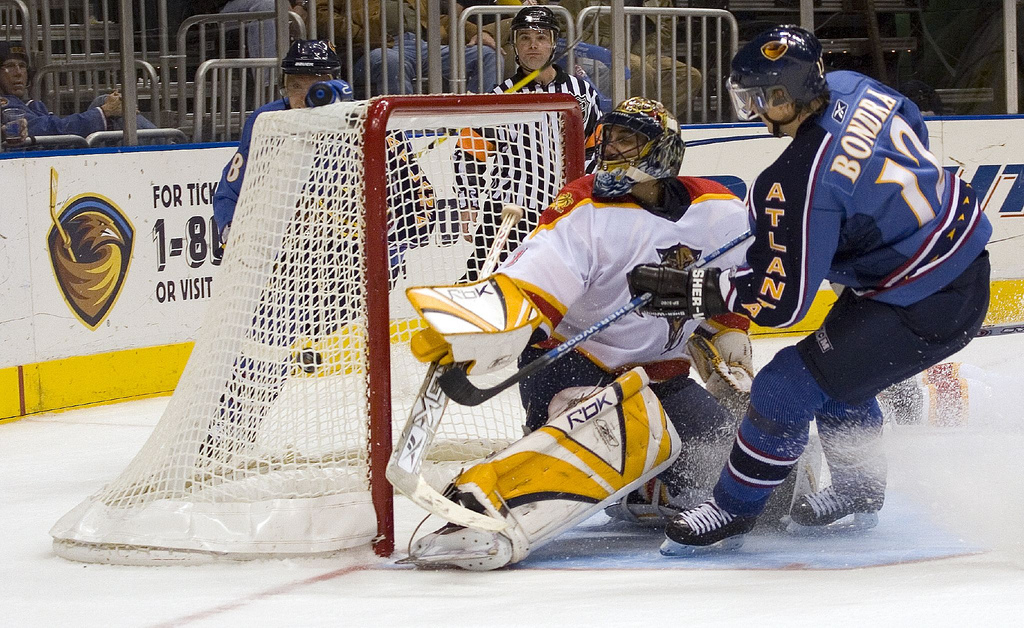
Peter Bondra scoring a goal in ice hockey

Multipurpose basketball and futsal/handball goalpost

In sport, a goal may refer to either an instance of scoring, or to the physical structure or area where an attacking team must send the ball or puck in order to score points. The structure of a goal varies from sport to sport, and one is placed at or near each end of the playing field for each team to defend. Sports which feature goal scoring are also commonly known as invasion games.

For many sports, each goal structure usually consists of two vertical posts, called goal posts, supporting a horizontal crossbar. A goal line marked on the playing surface between the goal posts demarcates the goal area. Thus, the objective is to send the ball or puck between the goal posts, under or over the crossbar (depending on the sport), and across the goal line. Other sports may have other types of structures or areas where the ball or puck must pass through, such as the basketball hoop.

In several sports, sending the ball or puck into the opponent's goal structure or area is the sole method of scoring, and thus the final score is expressed in the total number of goals scored by each team. In other sports, a goal may be one of several scoring methods, and thus may be worth a different set number of points than the others.

== Methods of scoring ==
In some sports, the goal is the sole method of scoring. In these sports, the final score is expressed as the number of goals scored by each team.

In other sports, a goal is not the sole method of scoring. In these sports, the goal is worth a set number of points but there are other methods of scoring which may be worth more, the same, or fewer points. In these sports, the score is expressed as the total number of points earned by each team. In Australian rules football the score is expressed by listing the quantity of each team's "goals" and "behinds" followed by the total number of points.

The winner is the team that accumulates more goals or points over a specified time period. Depending on the sport, the time may be divided in half, thirds, quarters, or some other interval with intermissions in between them. Also depending on the sport, the time may be temporarily stopped whenever the ball or puck lands out of bounds, after a goal or points are scored, whenever a player commits a foul, due to injuries, or another "dead ball" or administrative reason. If the score remains tied after the time expires, depending on the match or competition, the game may simply end as a draw, or an extra period called overtime or extra time may be played.

== Structure ==
The structure of a goal varies from sport to sport. Most often, it is a rectangular structure that is placed at each end of the playing field. Each structure usually consists of two vertical posts, called goal posts (side bar or uprights) supporting a horizontal crossbar. A goal line marked on the playing surface between the goal posts demarcates the goal area.

In some games, such as association football or hockey, the object is to pass the ball between the posts below the crossbar, while in others, such as those based on rugby, the ball must pass over the crossbar instead. In Gaelic football and hurling, in which the goalposts are similar to those used in rugby, the ball can be kicked either under the crossbar for a goal, or over the crossbar between the posts for a point. In Australian rules football, there is no crossbar but four uprights instead. In basketball, netball or korfball, goals are ring-shaped. The structure is often accompanied with an auxiliary net, which stops or slows down the ball when a goal is scored. In netball, a single post at each end of the court supports a horizontal hoop that the ball must fall through. In basketball, the hoop and net used for scoring can be supported on a post or mechanism at each end, or on structures attached directly to the wall.

== Goal sports ==
=== Goal-only sports ===
The goal is the only method of scoring in several games. In each of these cases, the winner is the team that scores the most goals within the specified time.

==== Association football ====
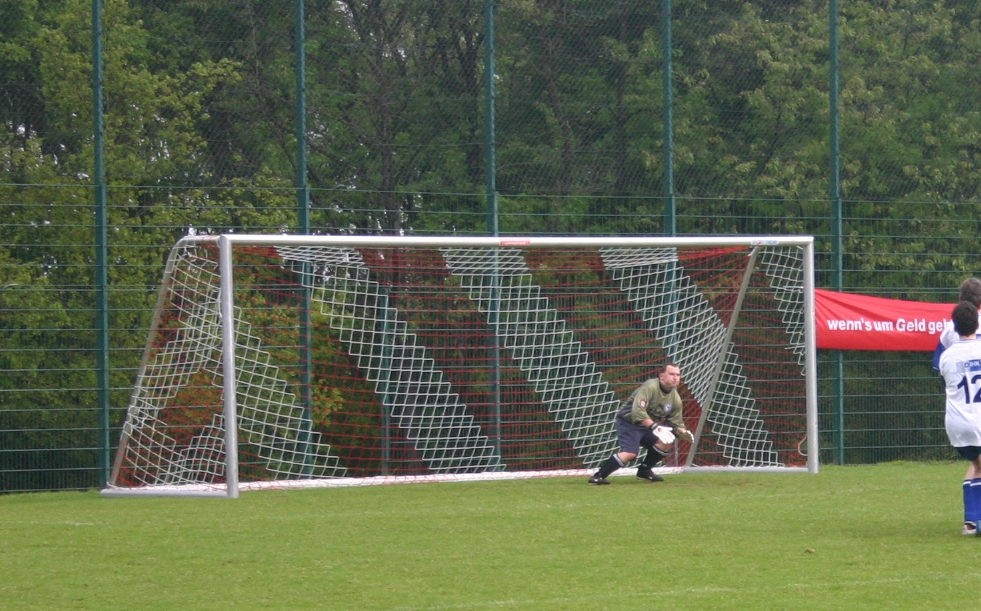
A goal in a match of association football

In association football, the goal is the only method of scoring. It is also used to refer to the scoring structure. An attempt on goal is referred to as a "shot" or "shot on goal". To score a goal, the ball must pass completely over the goal line between the goal posts and under the crossbar and no rules may be violated on the play (such as touching the ball with the hand or arm). See also offside.

The goal structure is defined as a frame 24 feet (7.32 m) wide by 8 feet (2.44 m) tall. In most organized levels of play a net is attached behind the goal frame to catch the ball and indicate that a goal has been scored; but the Laws of the Game do not mandate the use of a net and only require that any net used not interfere with the goalkeeper.

In Beach soccer the goal is defined as a frame 5.50 m wide by 2.20 m tall.

In Futsal the goal is defined as a frame 3 m wide by 2 m tall.

==== Hockey ====
===== Bandy =====
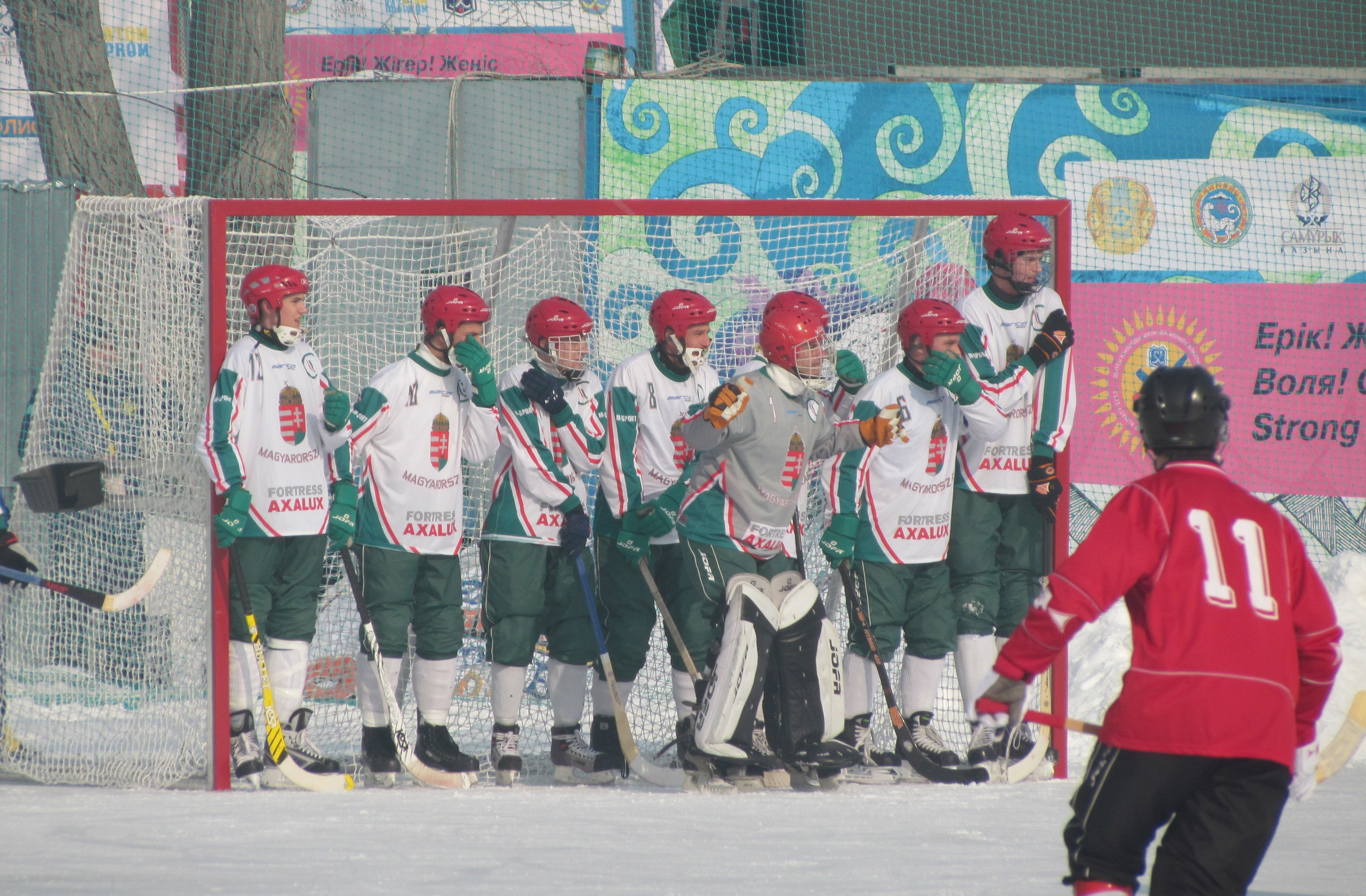
Hungarian players prepare to defend their goal against a Canadian corner-stroke at the 2012 Bandy World Championship. The goal-keeper has a different colour on his jersey, here grey.

In bandy, which has much of its structure from association football, the only way of scoring is to make a goal and the goal is also used to refer to the scoring structure. If neither of the teams has scored during a match, or if both teams have made the same number of goals, there is a draw unless it is a playoff game, which is then determed by overtime and eventually also a penalty shootout. If not otherwise decided in the Bandy Playing Rules set up by the Federation of International Bandy, an approved goal is made when the ball is played in a regular manner and the whole ball has passed the inner definition of the goal line between the two goal posts and the cross-bar. This is stated in section 9 of the Rules. A goal can be made directly from a stroke-off, penalty-shot, a free-stroke, a face-off or a corner stroke. Centered at each short-line of the bandy field is a 3.5 m (11 ft) wide and 2.1 m (6 ft 11 in) high goal cage, regulated to size, form, material and other properties in section 1.4 of the Bandy Playing Rules. The cage has a net to stop the ball when it has crossed the goal-line. The cage shall be of an approved model. In front of the goal cage is a half-circular penalty area with a 17 m (56 ft) radius. A penalty spot is located 12 metres (39 ft) in front of the goal and there are two free-stroke spots at the penalty area line, each surrounded by a 5 m (16 ft) circle.

===== Field Hockey =====
The goal structure in field hockey is 3.66 metres (12.0 ft) wide by 2.14 metres (7.0 ft) tall. Like association football, a goal is scored when the ball passes completely over the goal line under the crossbar and between the goal posts. Nets are required to hold the ball in. A goal is only scored if shot from within a semicircle 14.63 metres (48.0 ft) from the goal.

===== Ice Hockey =====
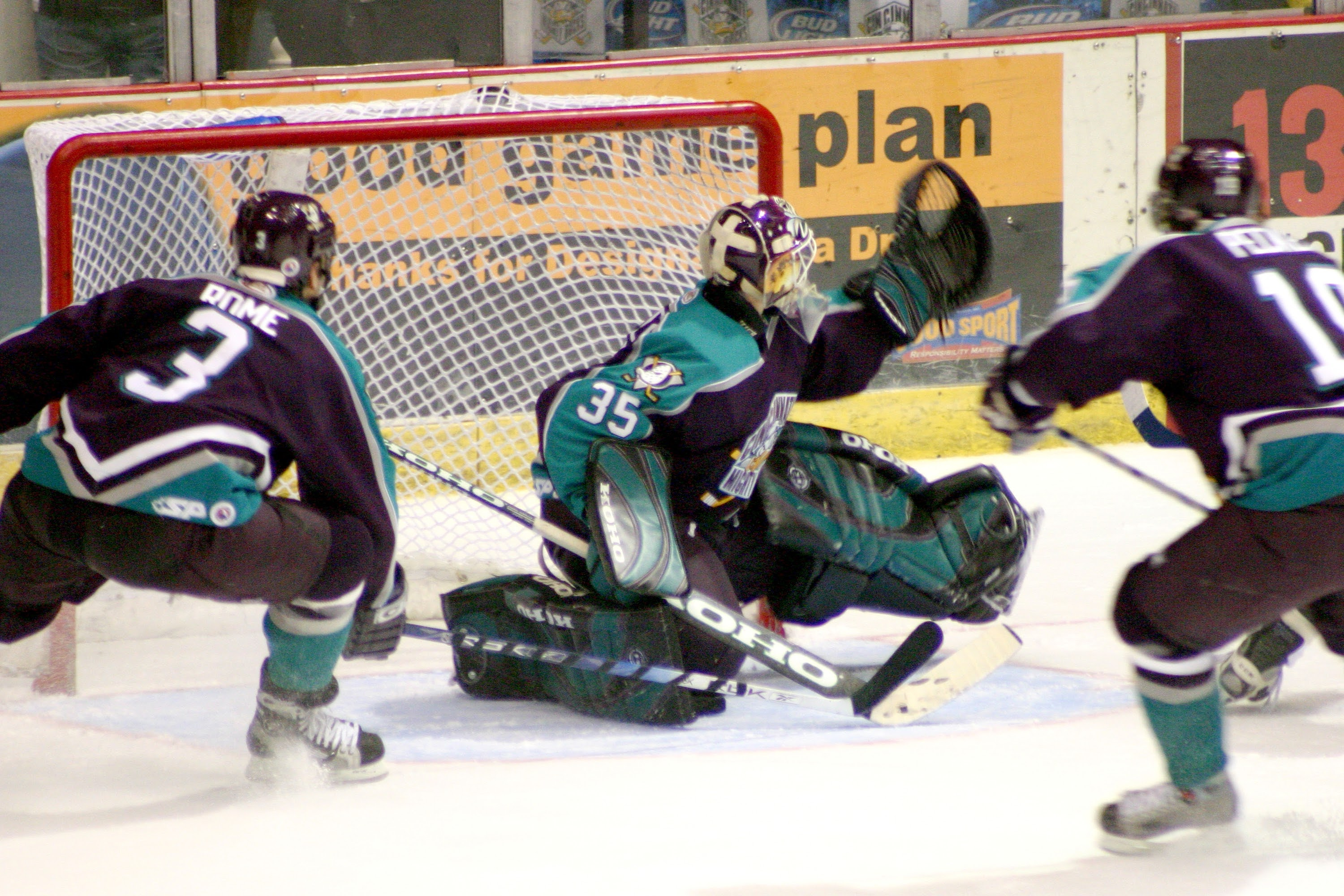
Ice hockey: The puck hits the top of the net for a goal as the goaltender fails to block the shot.

In ice hockey, the puck must be put completely over the goal line between the posts and under the bar either off an offensive player's stick or off any part of a defensive player's body. The puck may not be kicked, batted, or thrown into the goal, though a goal may be awarded if the puck is inadvertently deflected off an offensive player's skate or body into the goal. The goal structure is a frame 4 feet (1.2 m) tall and 6 feet (1.8 m) wide with a net attached. In most higher levels of play the goal structure is attached to the ice surface by flexible pegs and will break away for safety when hit by a player. The goal is placed within the playing surface, and players may play the puck behind the goal.

Various statistics exist for measuring goals from goals on power-play to short-handed goals to game-winning goals (for go-ahead goals that determined the outcome). Alexander Ovechkin leads the NHL in all-time game-winning goals with 141.

==== Handball ====
A goal in handball is scored when the ball is thrown completely over the goal line, below the crossbar and between the goal posts. The goal structure in team handball is 2 metres high and 3 metres wide. A net is required to catch the ball.

==== Lacrosse ====
Lacrosse goals are scored when the ball travels completely past the goal line. Goals can be disallowed if there is an infraction by the offensive team. The goal in lacrosse is 6 feet (1.8 m) tall and 6 feet (1.8 m) wide and a net is used to prevent the ball from reentering the field of play. Lacrosse goals are not positioned on the end boundary line; play often occurs behind the goal.

==== Netball ====
In netball, a goal is scored when the ball is shot through a goal ring on a pole.

==== Polo ====
In polo, a goal is scored if the ball passes completely between the goal posts, regardless of how far off the ground the ball is. The ball must be between the goal posts or the imaginary lines extending above the inside edges of the posts. A ball passing directly over a goal post does not score a goal.

The goal structure in Polo consists of two poles, at least 10 feet (3.0 m) high and exactly 8 yards apart. There is no crossbar and no net is required. The height at which a goal may be scored is infinite.

==== Hardcourt Bike Polo ====
In Hardcourt Bike Polo, a goal is scored if the ball passes completely over the goal line and the shot originated as a "shot" as defined by the rules. A shot is made with either end of the mallet head similar to swinging a hammer whereas a shuffle is made with the long side like pushing a broom. Traditionally when using a non-netted goal such as two traffic cones the play is continued if the ball is shuffled through the goal of pass through the goal from the opposite direction. These non-netted goals are no long regulation in competitive play but are common depending on the resources of a club.

==== Shinty ====
In shinty, a goal is scored if the ball goes over the goal line and under the crossbar. A goal can only be scored with a stick called a "caman"; no goal is scored if the ball is kicked, carried, or propelled by an attacking player's hand or arm.

==== Treibball ====
In Treibball, a point is scored when a dog knocks a ball (referred to as a rolling sheep) into the goal. Rolling sheep must be knocked into the goal in a particular order within the seven minute time limit.

==== Water polo ====
A goal in water polo is scored when the ball passes completely across the goal line, under the crossbar and between the goal posts. A goal may be scored through contact with any part of the attacker's body except a clenched fist. The goal structure in water polo is dependent upon the depth of the water. The goal mouth measures 3 metres across and is either 0.9 metres above the surface of the water or 2.4 metres above the floor of the pool, whichever is higher. Nets are required.

=== Games with secondary scoring other than goals ===
The following games have more than one possible method of scoring where the goal is the primary method, i.e. the method that scores the most points. In most cases the score is shown as the number of goals, plus the number of secondary scores (usually 1 point), plus the total number of points. The side with the higher number of total points is the winner.

==== Australian rules football ====
In Australian rules football a goal is scored when the ball is kicked by an attacking player completely between the two tall goal posts. To be awarded a goal, the ball may not contact or pass over the goal post, or touch any player on any part of the body other than the foot or lower leg of an attacker. In such cases, the score is a behind (1 point). The ball may be punted, drop kicked, or kicked off the ground (soccered). The ball may cross the goal line at any height from ground level up and may bounce before crossing the line. A goal scores six points. The behind, which scores one point, is awarded if the ball passes between the point posts or is not awarded a goal by the above provisions when passing through the goal posts. The goal structure consists of two posts at least 6 metres in height and spaced 6.4 metres apart. There is no crossbar and no net.

==== Basketball ====
The primary object of basketball is to score by shooting (i.e., throwing) the ball into a goal officially called the basket. A basket is scored when the ball passes completely through the basket ring from above; however, the number of points scored with each basket depends on where on the court the ball was shot from, and a team does not necessarily need to score the most baskets to win the game. Basketball scores are expressed in total points.

A basket scored during normal play is called a field goal and is worth two points if shot from within or on the three-point line, and three points if shot from beyond the three-point line. The three-point line's distance from the basket varies by level. Points are also awarded to the shooting team if the defensive team commits goaltending or basket interference while the ball is in flight towards the basket or is directly over it.

A basketball team can also score by free throws, which score one point each. Free throws are awarded to a team after the opponent commits a foul in certain scenarios. The player taking the free throws (usually the player who was fouled) is entitled to take a specified number of shots unopposed with both feet behind the free throw line.

The basket consists of a metal ring 18 inches (46 cm) in internal diameter, suspended horizontally 10 feet (3.0 m) above the floor such that the center of the ring is equidistant from each sideline and 5 feet 3 inches (1.60 m) from the end line. The basket ring has a net attached below to briefly check the ball's downward progress and indicate a score. The ring is fastened to a rectangular backboard 6 feet (1.8 m) wide by 3.5 feet (1.1 m) tall, though in lower levels of play or recreational use the backboard may be smaller or fan-shaped. The entire structure is supported from behind and anchored to the floor beyond the end line at higher levels of play; the structure may be anchored to a wall or ceiling at lower levels of play. The ring, net, and the front, top, bottom, and sides of the backboard are all considered inbounds, while the back of the backboard and the support structure – even those parts suspended over inbounds areas of the court – are considered out of bounds.

==== Gaelic games ====
Scoring system in gaelic games
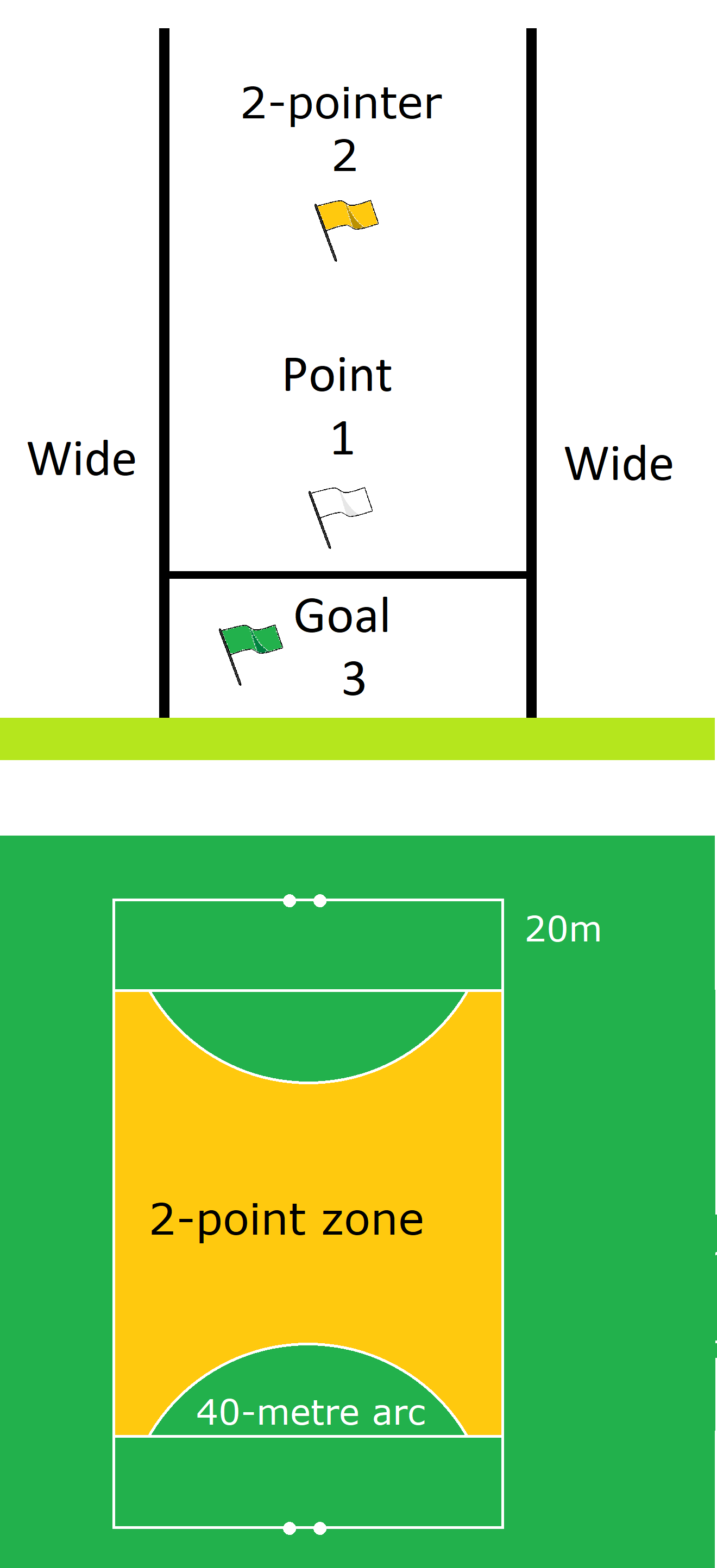
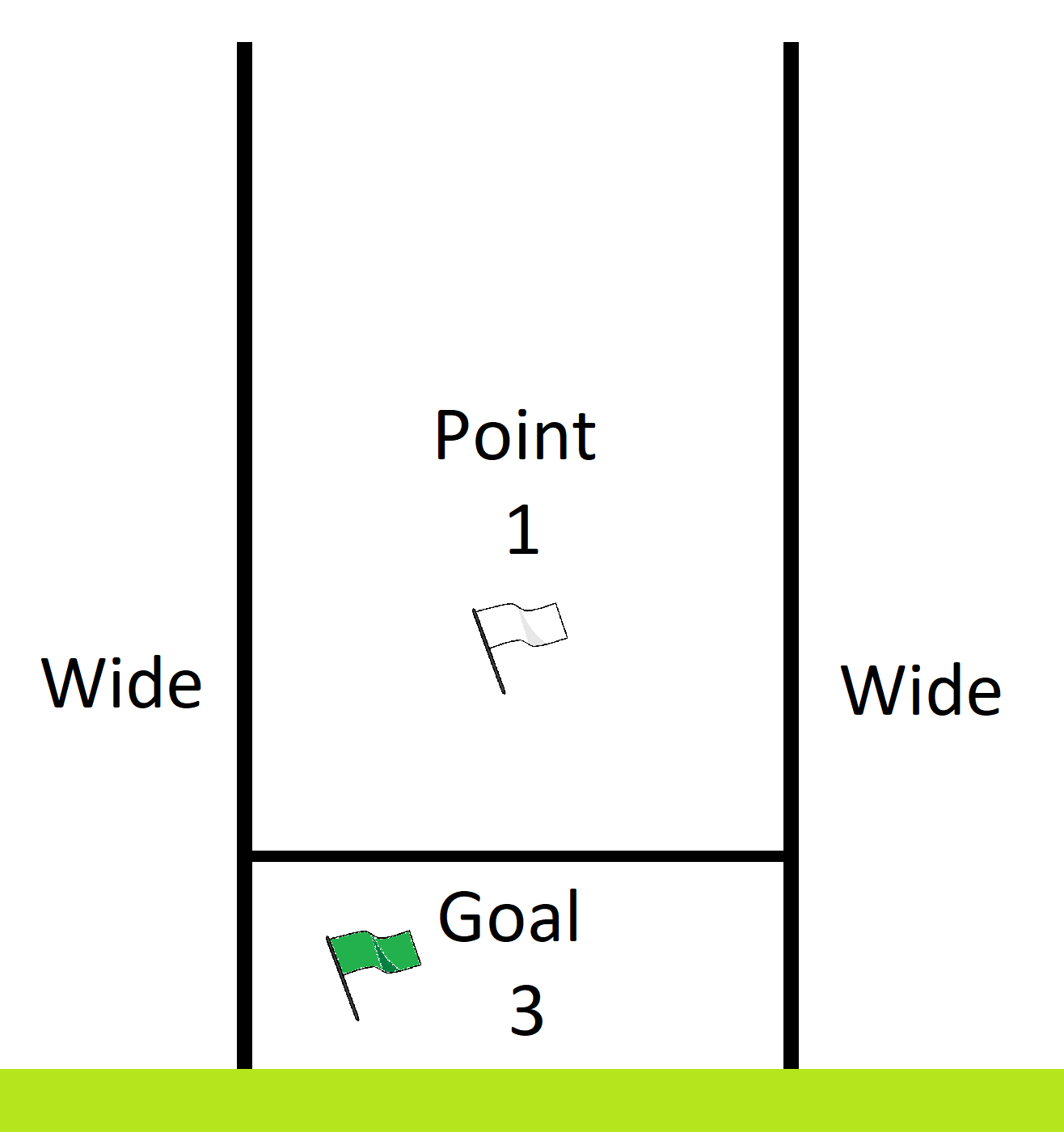
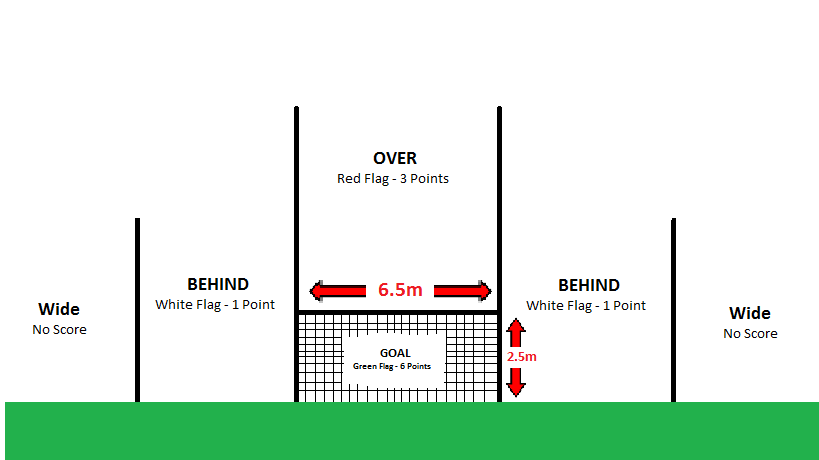
Top left: gaelic football. Top right: hurling, camogie, ladies' Gaelic football and shinty-hurling. Bottom: international rules football.

===== Gaelic football and Ladies' football =====
In Gaelic football and ladies' Gaelic football a goal is scored when the ball passes completely beyond the goal line, between the goal posts and under the cross bar. The ball can be played with the hands, but a goal cannot be scored by hand. A ball travelling between the goal posts and over the cross bar is awarded one pointed called an "over". Overs are the most common scoring method with goals heavily defended. A goal is worth three points.

===== Hurling and camogie =====
In hurling and camogie the ball ("sliotar") must pass completely beyond the goal line. The ball may be played by any legal method except by the hand of the attacker. A ball in flight may be deflected into the goal off the hand of an attacker. Hurling and Gaelic football use the same goal structure. It is a 6.4 meter wide frame with a net attached. The goal posts are at least 6 meters high, and the crossbar is 2.44 meters above the ground. A goal is scored when the ball crosses below the crossbar and a point is scored when the ball passes above it.

=== Sports with goals as secondary scoring ===
At each end of the field in the following games, there is both a marked scoring area and a separate goal post structure. In these games, the term "goal" is only used for the secondary scoring method of putting the ball through the goal post structure.

==== Gridiron football ====
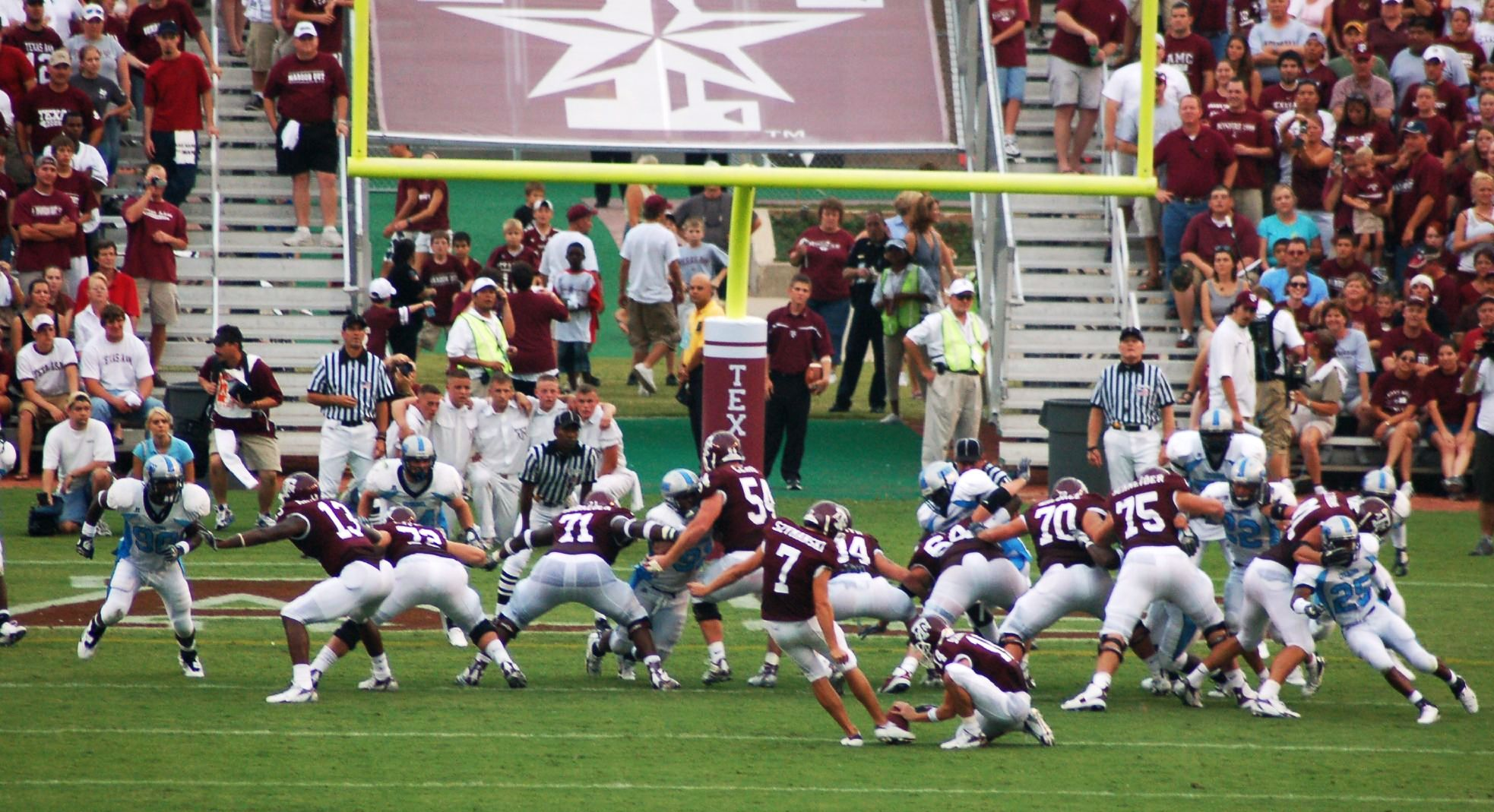
American football: Texas A&M attempts to kick a field goal against The Citadel

In American and Canadian football, there is a scoring area marked at each end of the field called an end zone, and a separate goal post structure.

The primary method of scoring is a touchdown. Whether running, passing, returning a kickoff or punt, or recovering a turnover, a team scores a touchdown by advancing the ball into the end zone. A touchdown scores 6 points in both versions of the sport. The front line of the end zone is the "goal line", its back line is the "end line", and each corner is marked with a pylon. Each end zone in American football is about 10 by 53.33 yards (9.14 m × 48.76 m) wide, while each end zone in Canadian football is about 20 by 65 yards (18 m × 59 m) wide. Unlike other sports which require the ball/puck to pass completely over the goal line to count as a score, both Canadian and American football merely need any part of the ball to break the vertical plane of the outer edge of the goal line to count as a touchdown.

A field goal is a secondary method of scoring; it is scored when the ball is place kicked or drop kicked completely over the crossbar and between or directly over the goal posts. A field goal scores 3 points in both versions of the sport. In the American game, the now rarely used fair catch kick, if successfully made, also scores 3 points. A goal kicked during a try following a touchdown is worth one point. These are the only methods of putting the ball through the goal posts that award points to the kicking team; no points are scored if the ball is punted or thrown through the goal posts, or if the ball goes through the goal posts on a kickoff (except, in the latter case, in indoor American football, where some leagues award a single point).

In both sports, the goal structure consists of a horizontal crossbar suspended ten feet (3.05 m) above the ground and vertical goal posts ("uprights") placed 18 feet 6 inches (5.64 m) apart and extending at least 35 feet (10.67 m) above the crossbar. In lower levels of play the goal posts may be placed further apart or not extend as far above the crossbar; for example, in high school football the posts are 23 feet 4 inches (7.11 m) apart. NFL and CFL rules mandate that a ribbon be attached to the top of each goal post. Goals are centered on the field, but on different lines: in American football, they lie on the "end line" (far end of the end zone) and in Canadian football, on the "goal line" (beginning of the end zone). A retractable net may be placed behind the goal posts, well beyond the field of play, to prevent the ball from entering spectator areas.

Until the mid-1960s, the goal posts were similar in design to rugby posts, with the crossbar and uprights supported by stanchions installed directly underneath the uprights (in the shape of the letter 'H'). A transitional design from this time retained the twin set of stanchions but placed them behind the crossbar. In this design, the crossbar and uprights were supported by a set of horizontal, vertical, and diagonal stanchions behind each upright. This design was last used professionally in the first Super Bowl in January 1967. The modern goal posts supported by a single "goose-necked" stanchion (in the shape of the letter 'Y') made their debut in the 1966 CFL playoffs and were adopted by all three professional leagues (CFL, NFL, and AFL) the following year, with many (but not all) college teams following suit in the years since. The NFL, which merged with the AFL in 1970, had its crossbar over the goal line until 1974.

In arena football, a field goal also scores three points, unless it is drop kicked, in which case it scores four points. The goal structure in arena football is much smaller than the outdoor game; it consists of a crossbar 15 feet (4.57 m) above the playing surface and 9.5 feet (2.90 m) wide; this size is also used for most other indoor leagues as well. Uniquely in arena football, the goal posts are attached to nets on either side of the crossbar which are taut to allow the ball to rebound back onto the field of play. The nets are 30 feet (9.14 m) wide and 37 feet (11.28 m) high. These nets do not represent a scoring area, but keep the ball in play and prevent it from entering the crowd.

Canadian football also offers a secondary form of goal, the rouge or single point; it is awarded if a ball enters the end zone by way of any kick (either a missed field goal or a punt) and is not returned by the opposing team; this is not offered in American football (such a play results in a touchback instead).

==== Rugby football ====
In both rugby codes, there is a scoring area marked at each end of the field called an in-goal area, and a separate H-shaped goal structure. The primary scoring method is a try, worth 5 points in rugby union and worth 4 points in rugby league. A try is scored by grounding the ball in the in-goal area.

A goal is scored in either rugby code by place kicking or drop kicking a ball over the crossbar and between the uprights of H-shaped goalposts. The goalposts are positioned centrally on the goal line (the front line of the in-goal area). The crossbar is 3 metres (9.8 ft) from the ground; the uprights are 5.5 metres (18 ft) apart in rugby league and 5.6 metres (18 ft) in rugby union.

Rugby goal types and points values
Type	Kick type	Union pts	League pts	Notes
Drop goal	Drop	3	1	Scored from open play.
Penalty goal	Place or drop	3	2	Usually place-kicked.
Conversion goal	Place or drop	2	2	Usually place-kicked.
Goal from mark	Mark	3	3	Abolished in 1922 in league and 1977 in union.

In the early years of rugby, only goals counted in scoring, and a "try" counted only if "converted" into a goal. The official name "goal from a try" for a converted try persisted until 1979.

== Goal celebration ==
Celebrating the scoring of a goal is common. It is normally performed by the goalscorer and may involve teammates, the manager, coaching staff and the supporters of the team. Whilst referring to the celebration of a goal in general, the term can also be applied to specific actions such as a player removing a shirt or performing a somersault.

== Metaphor ==
The expression "moving the goalposts", which means to make a set of goals more difficult just as they are being met, is often used in business but is derived from association football. It is commonly used to imply bad faith on the part of those setting goals for others to meet, by arbitrarily making additional demands just as the initial ones are about to be met.

In business, the concept is more abstract, with some performance measure or target being set as a goalpost while achieving the target is often known as achieving a goal.

== Goalposts ==
Sport	Regulated by	Shape	Width	Height	Depth	Diagram
Basketball
3x3	FIBA	Netted circle	0.45-0.459 meters (diameter)	3.044-3.056 meters above floor	0.45-0.459 meters (net)	
Basketball	FIBA	Netted circle	0.45-0.459 meters (diameter)	3.044-3.056 meters above floor	0.45-0.459 meters (net)	
Basketball	NBA	Netted circle	18 inches (0.46 m) (diameter)	10 feet (3.0 m) above floor	18 inches (0.46 m) (net)	
Football codes
Soccer	FIFA	Netted rectangular	8 yards (7.3 m)	8 feet (2.4 m)		
Beach soccer	FIFA	Netted rectangular	5.5 meters	2.2 meters		
Futsal	FIFA	Netted rectangular	3 meters	2 meters		
American	IFAF	Carving fork	222 inches (5.6 m)	10 feet (3.0 m) above ground		
Canadian	Football Canada	Carving fork	222 inches (5.6 m)	10 feet (3.0 m) above ground		
Arena		Uppercase H, with bouncing nets/ Uppercase U (hanged)	10 feet (3.0 m)	10 feet (3.0 m) above ground	-	
Rugby union	World Rugby	Uppercase H	5.6 meters	3 meters above ground	-	
Rugby league	IRL	Uppercase H	5.5 meters	3 meters above ground	-	
Australian rules	AFL Commission	4 posts	2 goal posts (6.4 meters apart) + 2 behind posts (6.4 meters apart from each side of goal post)	Goal posts: 6-15 meters Behind posts: 3-10 meters	-	
International rules	AFL Commission and GAA	Uppercase H (netted bottom) + 2 post	2 goal posts (6.4 metres apart) + 2 behind posts (6.4 metres apart from each side of goal post)	Goal posts: 6 meters, crossbar at 2.5 meters Behind posts: 3 meters		
Gaelic	GAA	Uppercase H (netted bottom)	6.5 meters	7 meters, crossbar at 2.5 meters	netted bottom 0.9 meters in depth	
Handball
Indoor	IHF	Netted cuboid	3 meters	2 meters	1 meter at floor, 0.8 meters at crossbar	
Beach	IHF	Netted cuboid	3 meters	2 meters	1 meter at floor, 0.8 meters at crossbar	
Wheelchair	IHF	Netted rectangular	3 meters	1.7 meters		
Hockey
Bandy	FIB	Netted cuboid	3.5 meters	2.1 meters	2 meters at floor, 1 meters at crossbar	
Rink bandy	FIB	Netted cuboid	1.83 meters	1.22 meters	0.6-1.12 meters	
Ball hockey	ISBHF	Netted cuboid	1.83 meters	1.22 meters	0.6-1.12 meters	
Field	FIH	Netted cuboid	3.66 meters	2.14 meters	1.2 meters at floor, 0.9 meters at crossbar	
Indoor	FIH	Netted cuboid	3 meters	2 meters	1 meter at floor, 0.8 meters at crossbar	
Beach	FIH	Netted rectangular cuboid	4 meters	2 meters	1 meter	
Floorball	IFF	Netted rectangular cuboid	1.6 meters	1.15 meters	0.65 meters at floor, 0.4 meters at crossbar	
Ice	IIHF	Netted rectangular	1.83 meters	1.22 meters		
Ice	NHL		72 inches (1.8 m)	48 inches (1.2 m)	40 inches (1.0 m) at floor, 18 inches (0.46 m) at crossbar	
Inline	World Skate		1.7 metres (67 in)	1.05 metres (41 in)	43 inches (1.1 m) at floor (semiellipse), 29 inches (0.74 m) at crossbar	
Quad	World Skate		1.7 metres (67 in)	1.05 metres (41 in)	0.64 meters at floor (semiellipse), 0.65 meters at crossbar	
Unicycle	IUF	Netted rectangular	1.8 meters	1.2 meters		
Underwater	CMAS	Rectangular cuboid (through)	3 meters	0.02 meters		
Lacrosse
Field	World Lacrosse	Netted square pyramid	6 feet (1.8 m)	6 feet (1.8 m)	7 feet (2.1 m)	
Women	World Lacrosse	Netted square pyramid	1.83 meters	1.83 meters	2.1 meters	
Sixes	World Lacrosse	Netted square pyramid	1.83 meters	1.83 meters		
Box	World Lacrosse	Netted rectangular pyramid	57 inches (1.4 m)	4 feet (1.2 m)		
Intercrosse		Netted rectangular pyramid	48 inches (1.2 m)	45 inches (1.1 m)	54 inches (1.4 m)	
Polo
Polo	FIP	2 posts	8 yards (7.3 m)	10 feet (3.0 m)		
Arena	FIP	2 posts	8–12 yards (7.3–11.0 m)	10–15 feet (3.0–4.6 m)		
Water sports
Canoe polo	ICF	Netted rectangular cuboid	1.5 meters	1 meter (above 2 meters from water)	0.5 meters	
Waterpolo	World Aquatics	Netted rectangular	3 meters	0.9 meters		
Other
Cycle ball	UCI	Netted rectangular	2 meters	2 meters		
Goalball	IBSA	Netted rectangular cuboid	8.95-9.05 meters	1.28-1.32 meters	0.5 meters	
Korfball	IKF	Cylinder/truncated cone	Diameters: 0.39-0.41 meters (top edge), 0.4-0.42 meters (bottom side)	3.5 meters above floor	0.235-0.25 meters	
Netball	World Netball	Netted circle	15 inches (0.38 m) (diameter)	10 feet (3.0 m) above floor	15–18 inches (0.38–0.46 m) (net)	
Shinty	Camanachd Association	Netted rectangular cuboid	12 feet (3.7 m)	10 feet (3.0 m)	3 feet (0.91 m)	

Basketball and similar

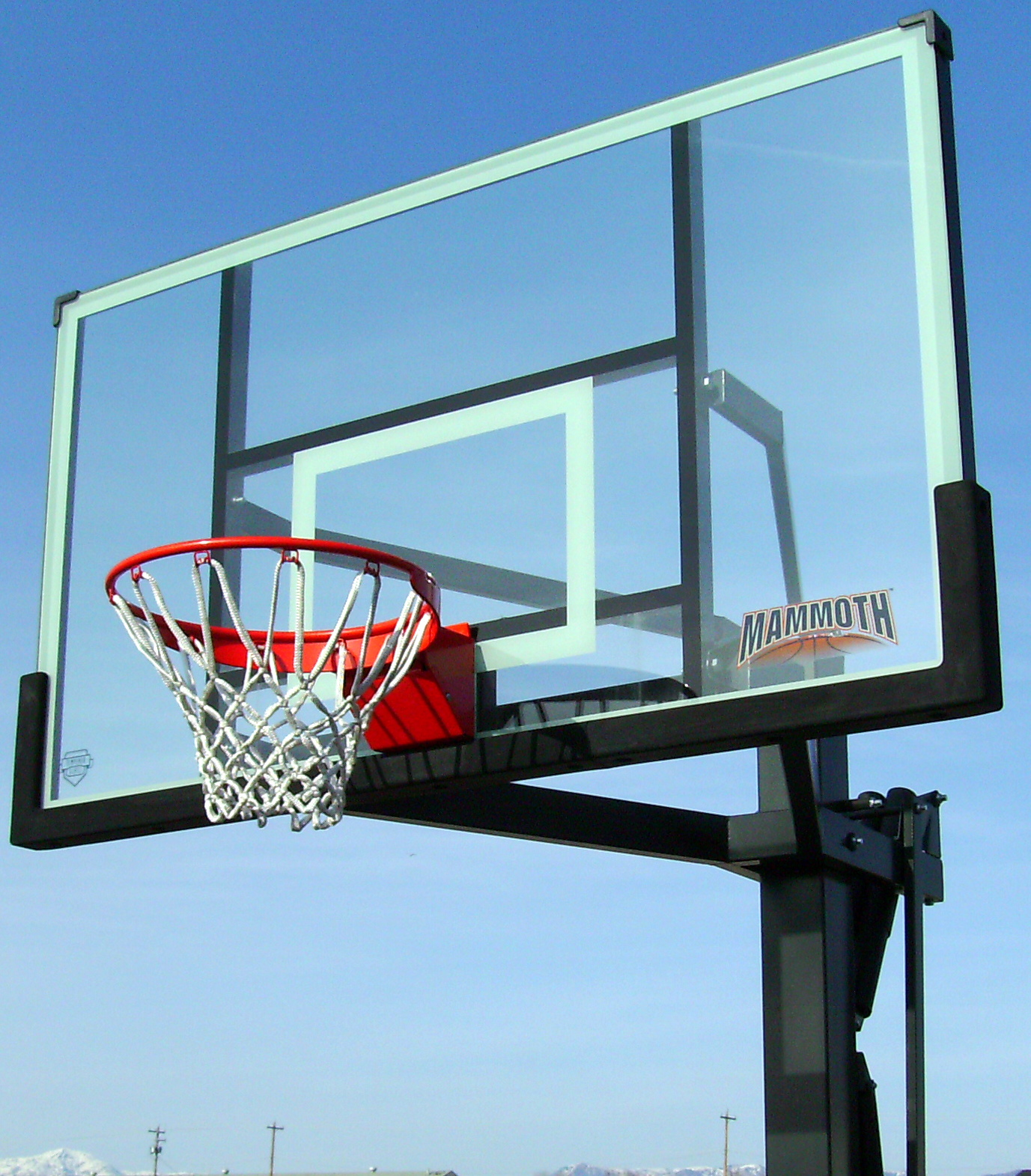
An outdoor basketball hoop

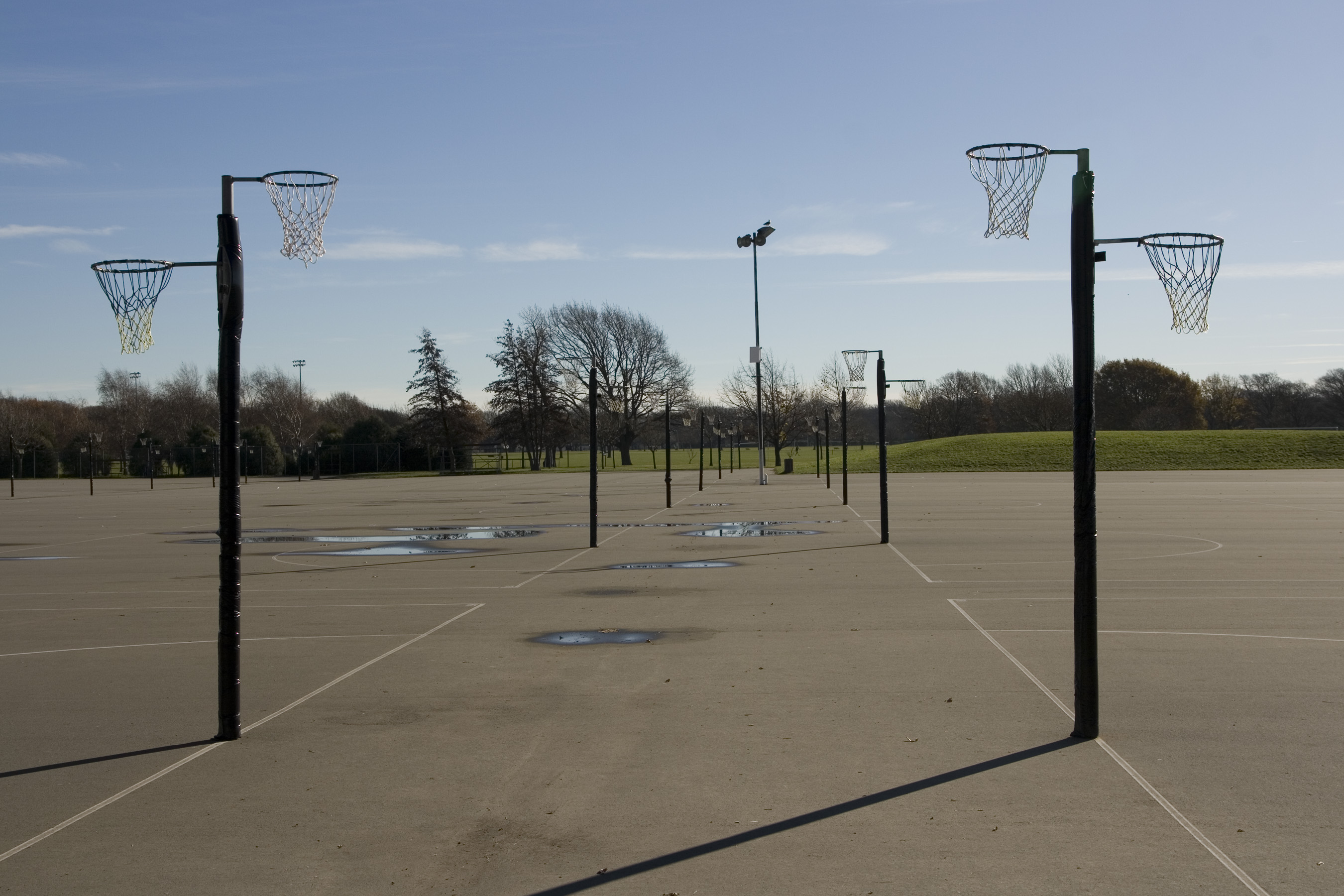
Netball hoops

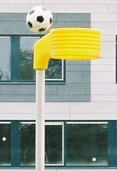
Korfball basket
Football codes

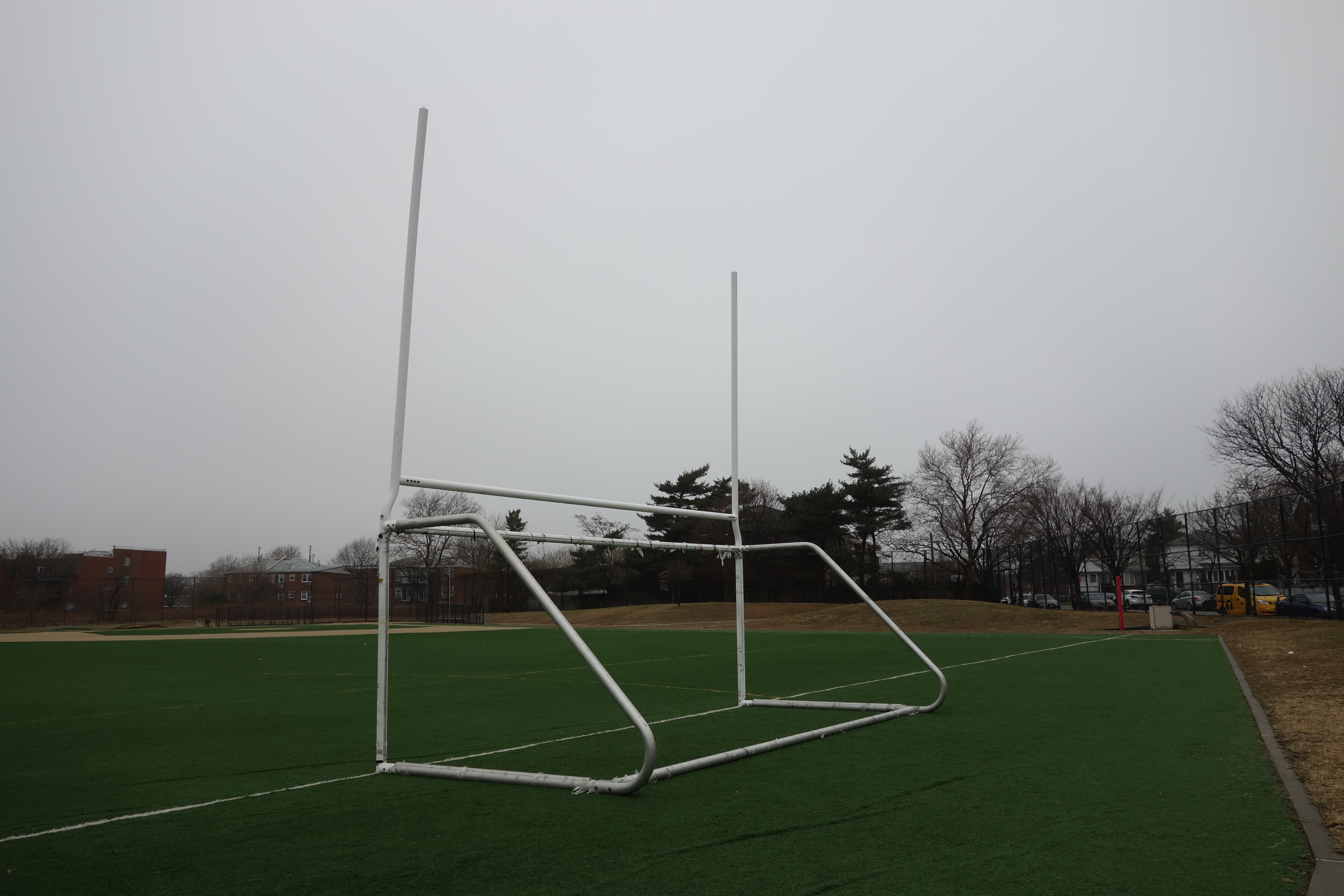
Multipurpose soccer and American football

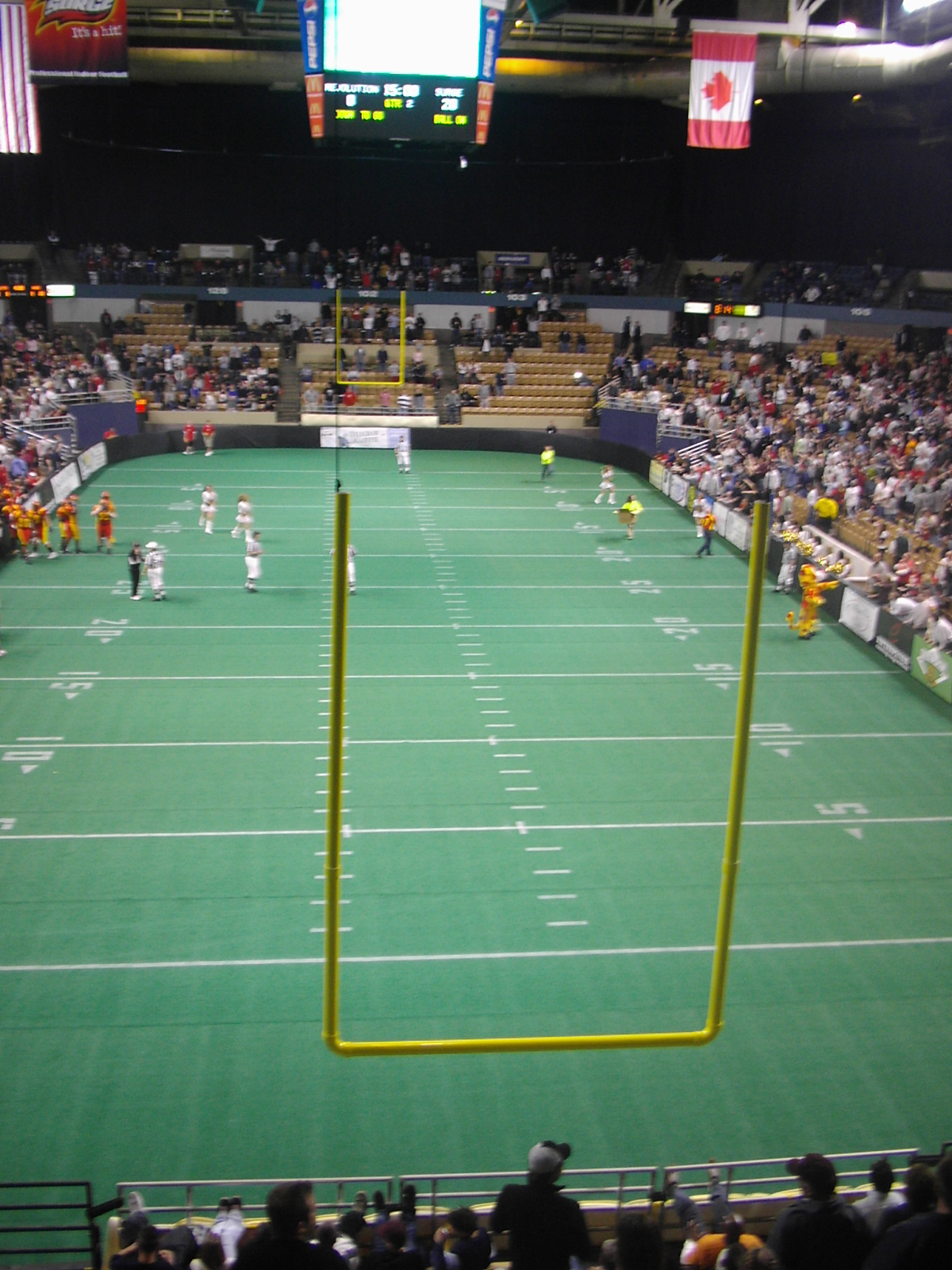
Arena football

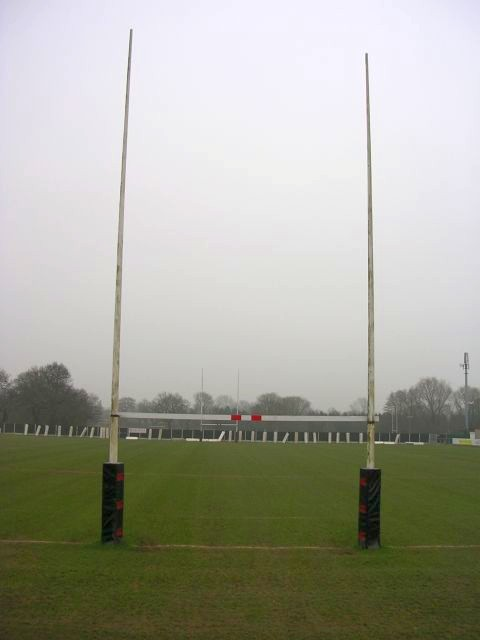
Rugby football

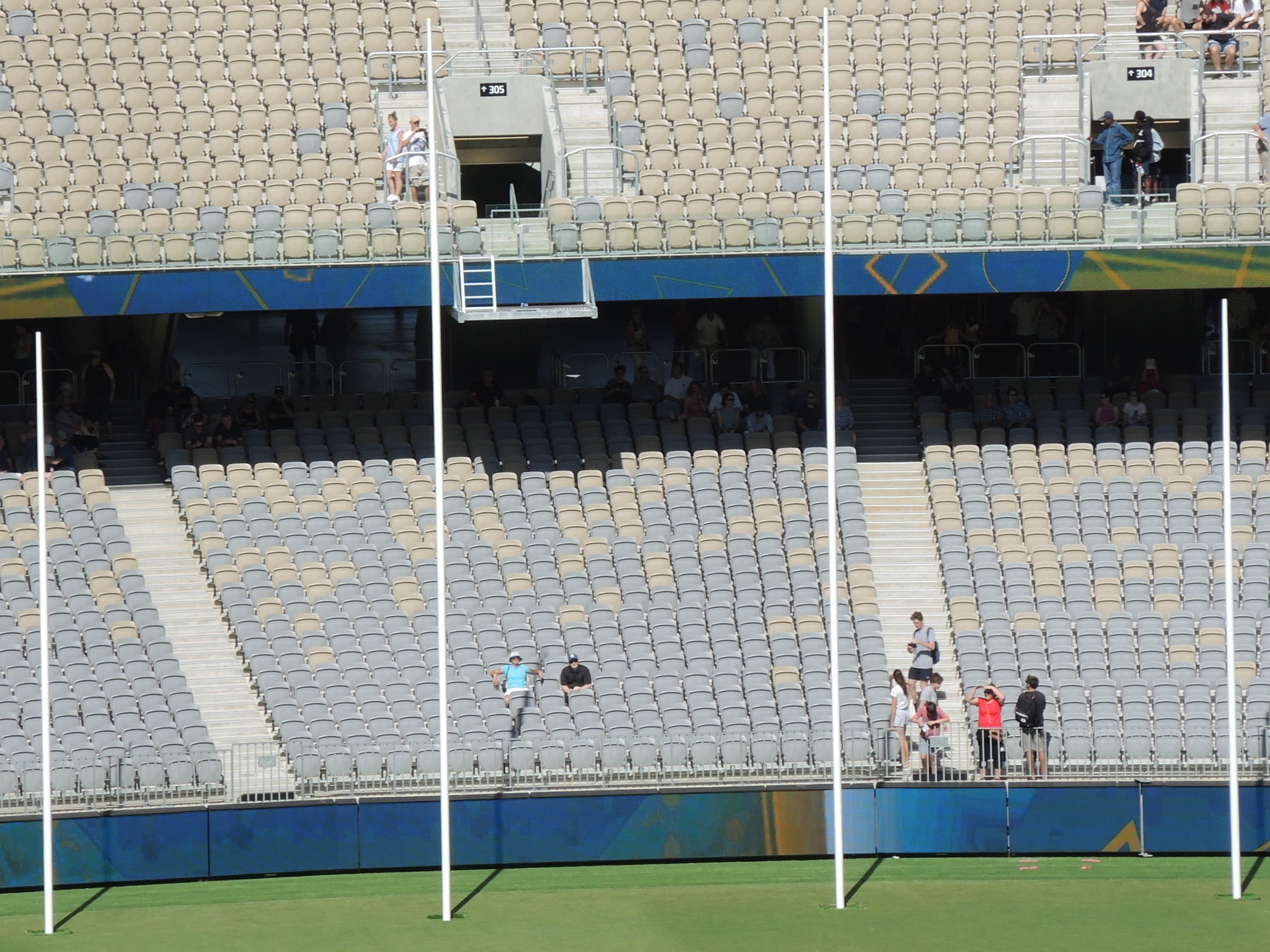
Australian rules football

Gaelic football
Hockey variations

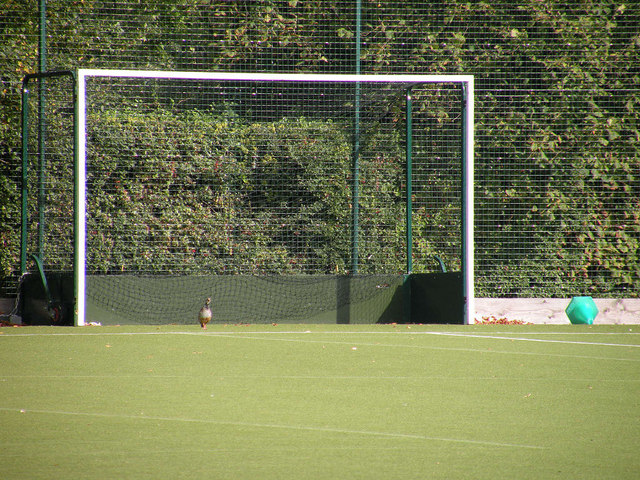
Field hockey

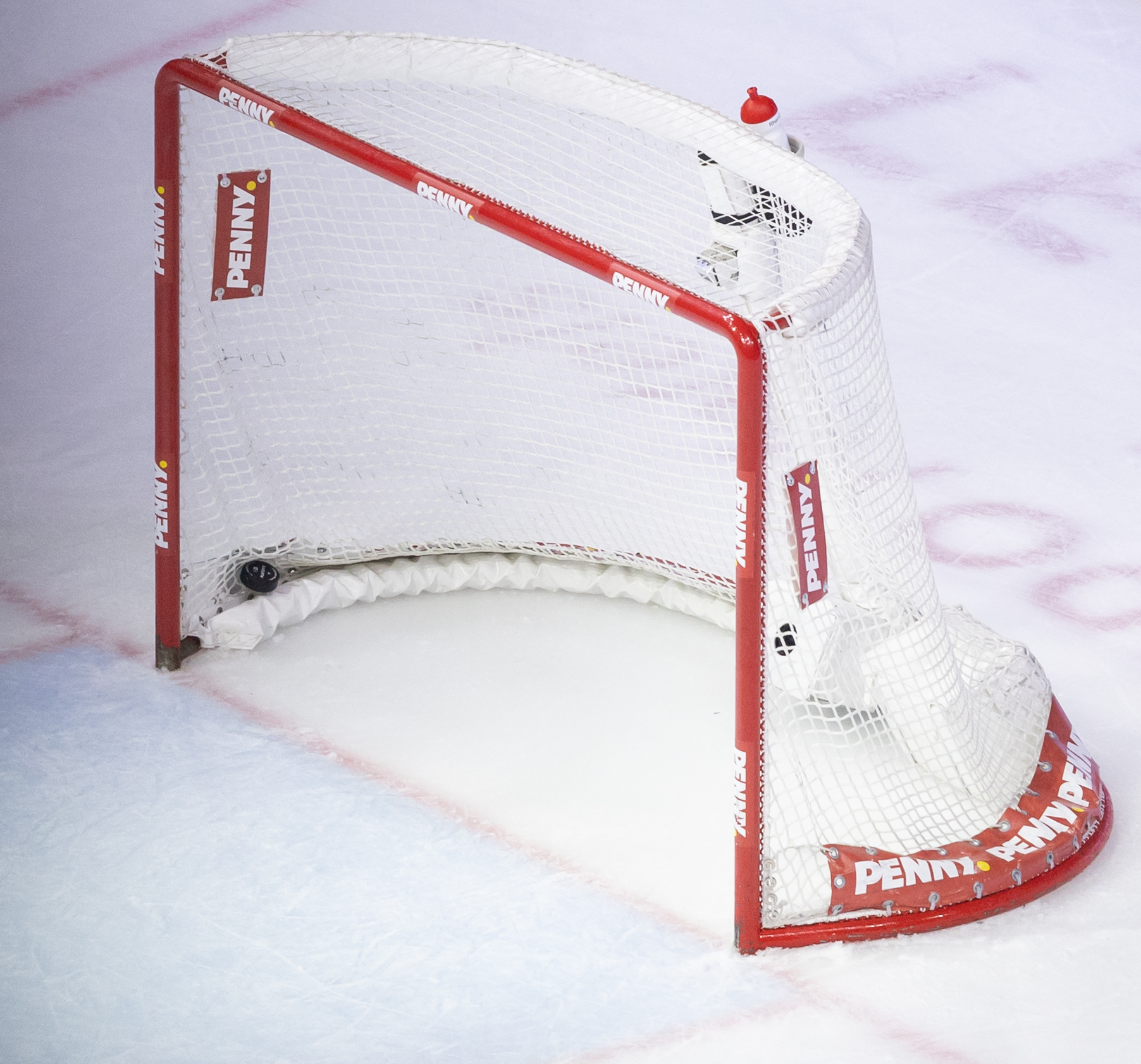
Ice hockey

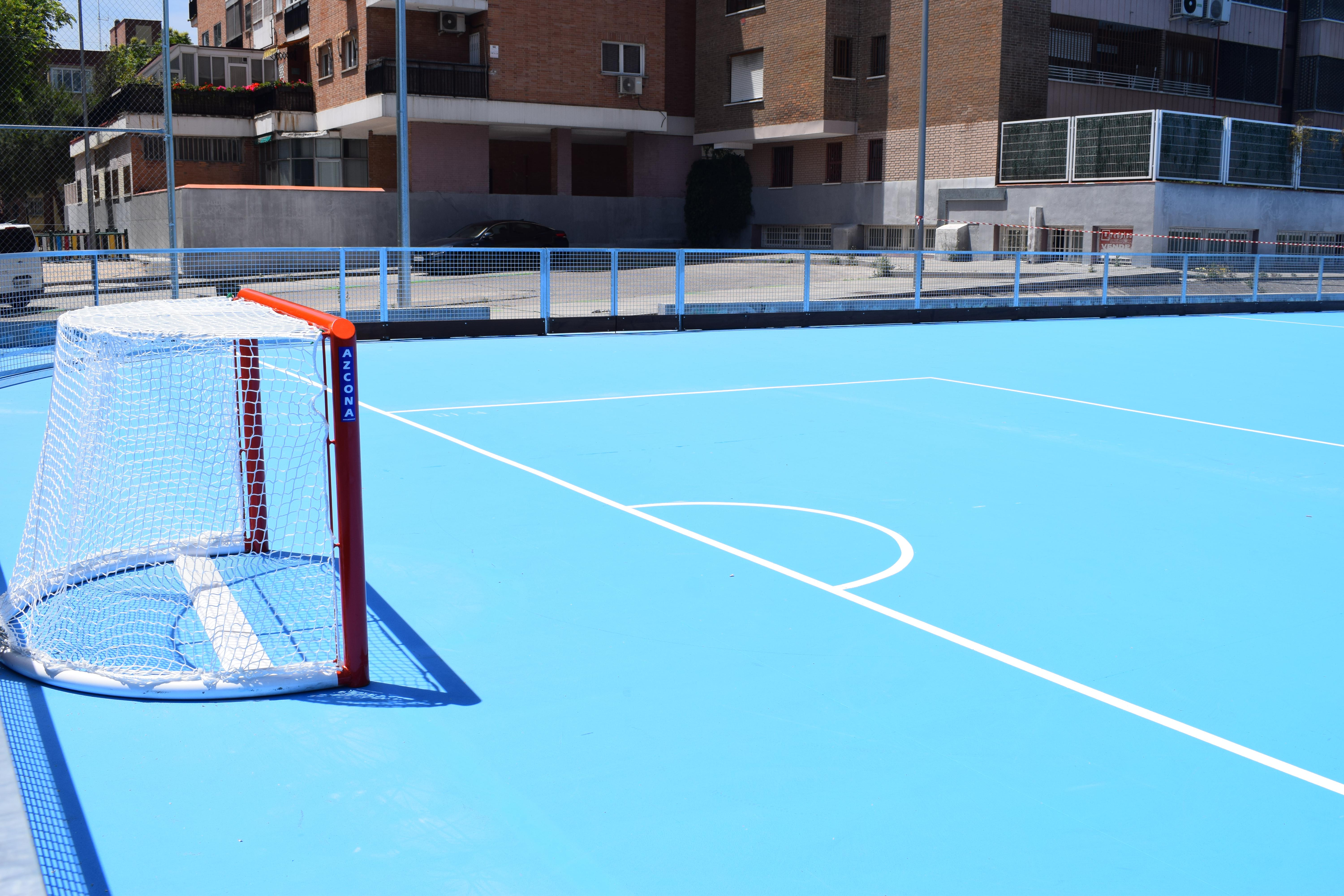
Roller hockey

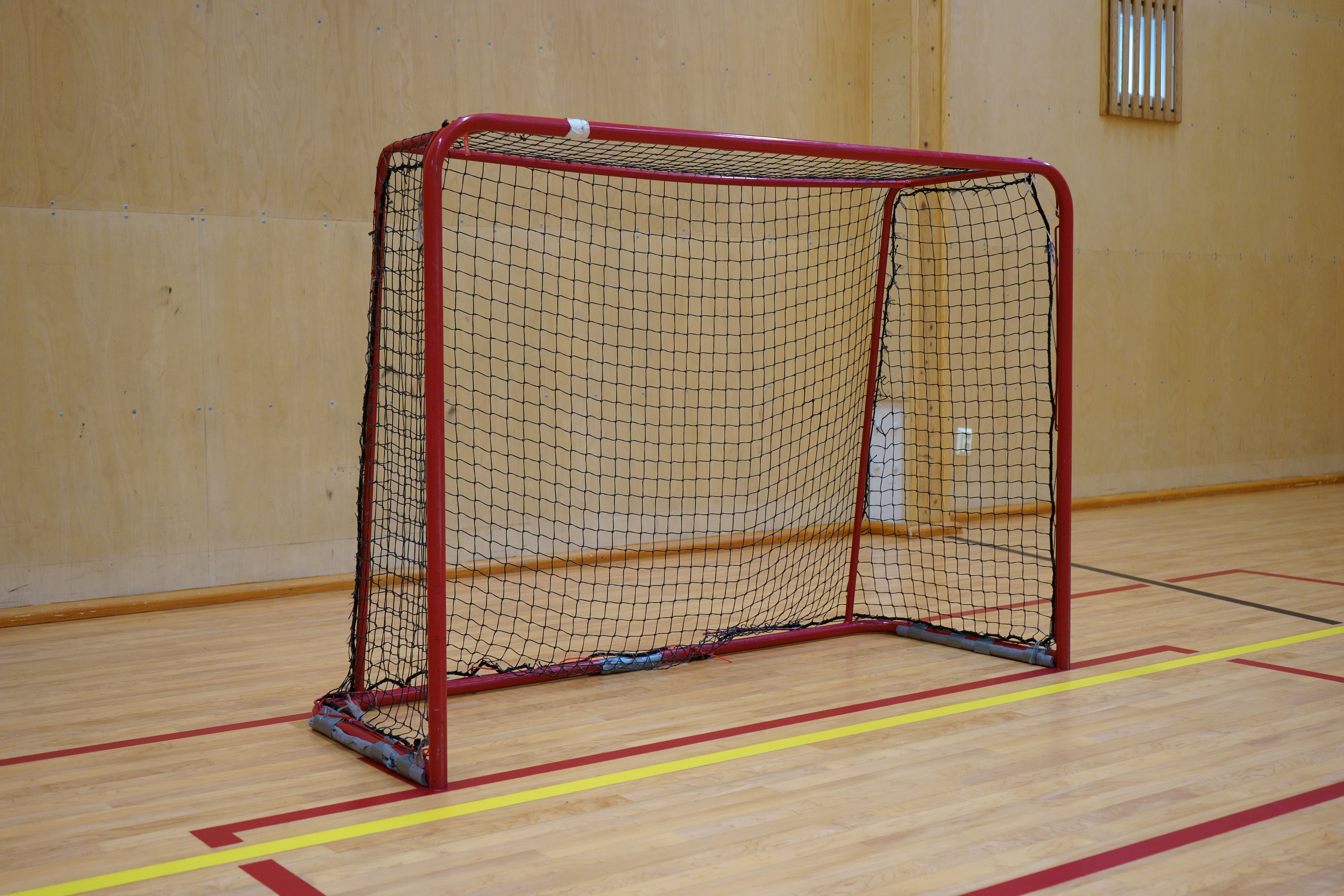
Floorball

== See also ==
- Goalkeeper
- Own goal
- Assist (sport)
