= Mark (rugby) =

Rugby term

In rugby union, a player may mark a ball, which means that the player may catch it and cannot be tackled by rival players. The marking player can choose to take a free-kick or a scrum at the position of the mark.

To mark a ball, the player must catch the ball inside their own team's twenty-two metre line. The mark is performed by a player (often the fullback), making a clean catch and shouting "Mark!". It is also common for the player to touch the ball on the ground or to hold up the ball with one hand to make their intentions clear to the referee and other players.

If for any reason, the player cannot take the kick within one minute, the marking team must take a scrum (and cannot otherwise choose a scrum). A ball may be marked if it has rebounded off the posts or crossbar. A mark may not be made from a kick-off.

After the marked ball is caught, the normal rules of a free kick apply, except in the case of a scrum option. A scrum from a mark should ideally be taken from the position of the mark, but must be at least five metres from touch. If the mark was made in the in-goal area, the scrum is taken five metres from the goal line on a line running through the mark parallel to the touch line but always at least five metres from the touch line.

If a player from the opposing team charges the marking player after the call of "Mark!", then the team will be awarded a penalty kick taken from the position of the mark, unless the infringing player was offside, in which case the penalty will be given from the offside line.

== History ==
For much of rugby's history, a mark could be made anywhere on the field, but under more stringent conditions: the marking player had to have both feet on the ground at the time of calling "Mark!", the defending side were allowed to advance as far as the mark in defending against the subsequent kick, and the kick itself had to propel the ball at least as far forward as the mark (in conjunction with the second stipulation, this effectively prevented the marking side from keeping possession with a tap-kick). However, under these restrictions a goal could be attempted. In the 1970s the mark was changed to the definition given above, except that it could be made anywhere in the defending side's 22; it is no longer a requirement that the marking player have both feet on the ground.

== Other football codes ==
The mark in rugby is similar to the fair catch in American football. The fair catch kick is still an option following a fair catch in the National Football League and high school football rule books but is not mandatory and rarely used due to strategic disadvantages;it was absent from the college football rulebook for decades, though Division I college football restored the option for the 2026 season.

Marks are used in Australian Football as well. Although the difference is, that marks are taken all over the ground and is one of the most important skills.

== See also ==
- Free kick
- Fair catch
- Goal from mark
- Garryowen
