= Penalty area =

Part of an association football pitch

The penalty area or 18-yard box (also known less formally as the penalty box or simply box) is an area of an association football pitch. It is rectangular and extends 18 yd (16.5 m) to each side of the goal and 18 yd (16.5 m) in front of it. If any part of the ball is over any part of a line demarking the penalty area then the ball is considered to be inside the penalty area.

Within the penalty area is the penalty spot, which is 12 yd (11.0 m) from the goal line, directly in line with the centre of the goal.

A penalty arc (often informally called "the D") adjoins the penalty area, and encloses the area within 10 yd (9.1 m) of the penalty spot. It does not form part of the penalty area and is only of relevance during the taking of a penalty kick, when any players inside the arc are adjudged to be encroaching.

Within the penalty area is another smaller rectangular area called the goal area (colloquially the "six-yard box"), which is delimited by two lines starting on the goal-line 6 yd (5.5 m) from the goalposts and extending 6 yd (5.5 m) into the pitch from the goal-line, and the line joining these. Goal kicks and any free kick by the defending team may be taken from anywhere in this area. Indirect free kicks awarded to the attacking team within the goal area are taken from the point on the line parallel to the goal line (the "six-yard line") nearest where the infringement occurred; they cannot be taken any closer to the goal line. Similarly drop-balls that would otherwise occur closer to the goal line are taken on this line.

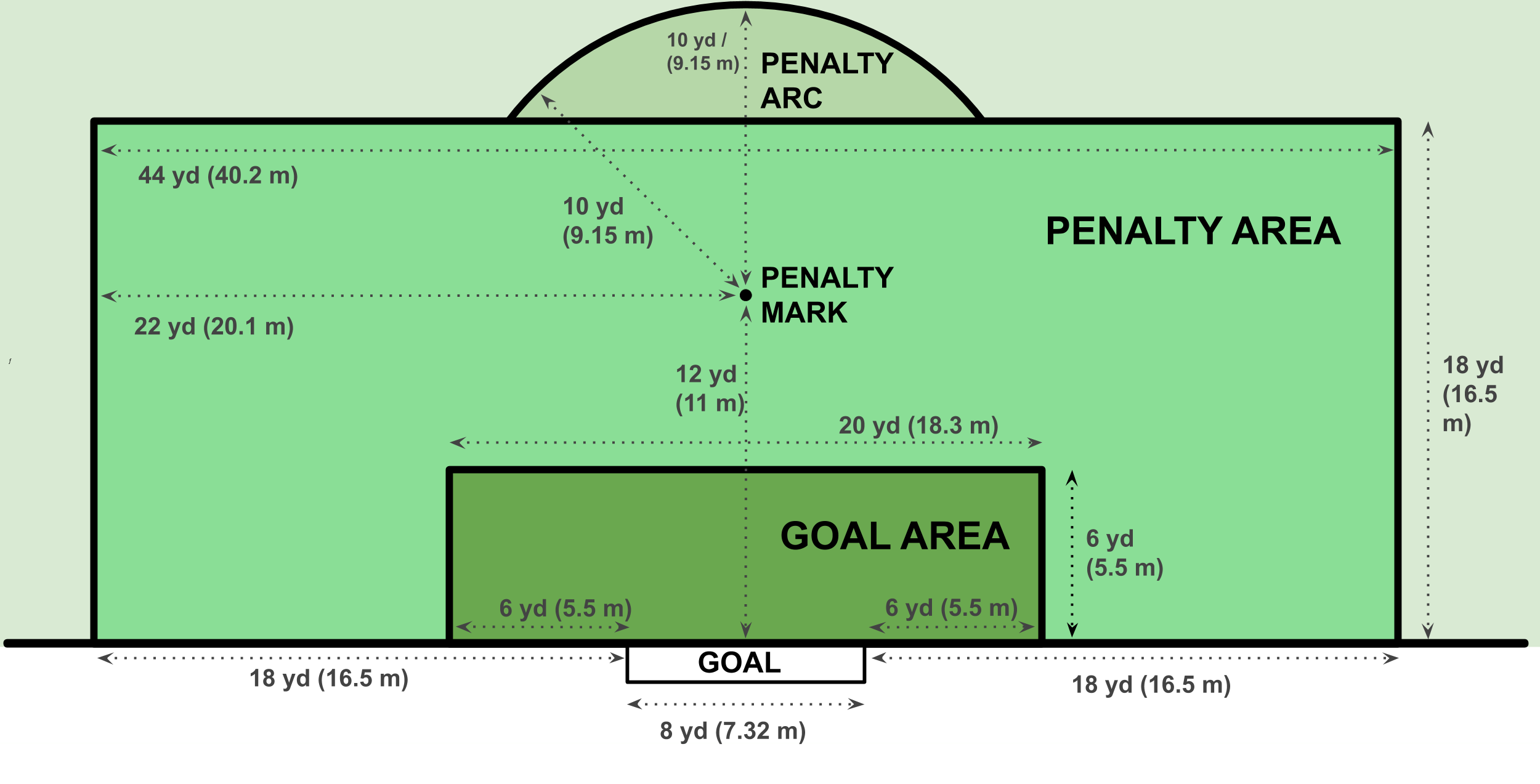
The penalty area with penalty box marking and the penalty arc in parallel to the goal. The smaller box is often called the 6-yard box

Schematic of an association football pitch, the penalty areas are the larger of the two rectangular regions surrounding the goals at both ends of the pitch

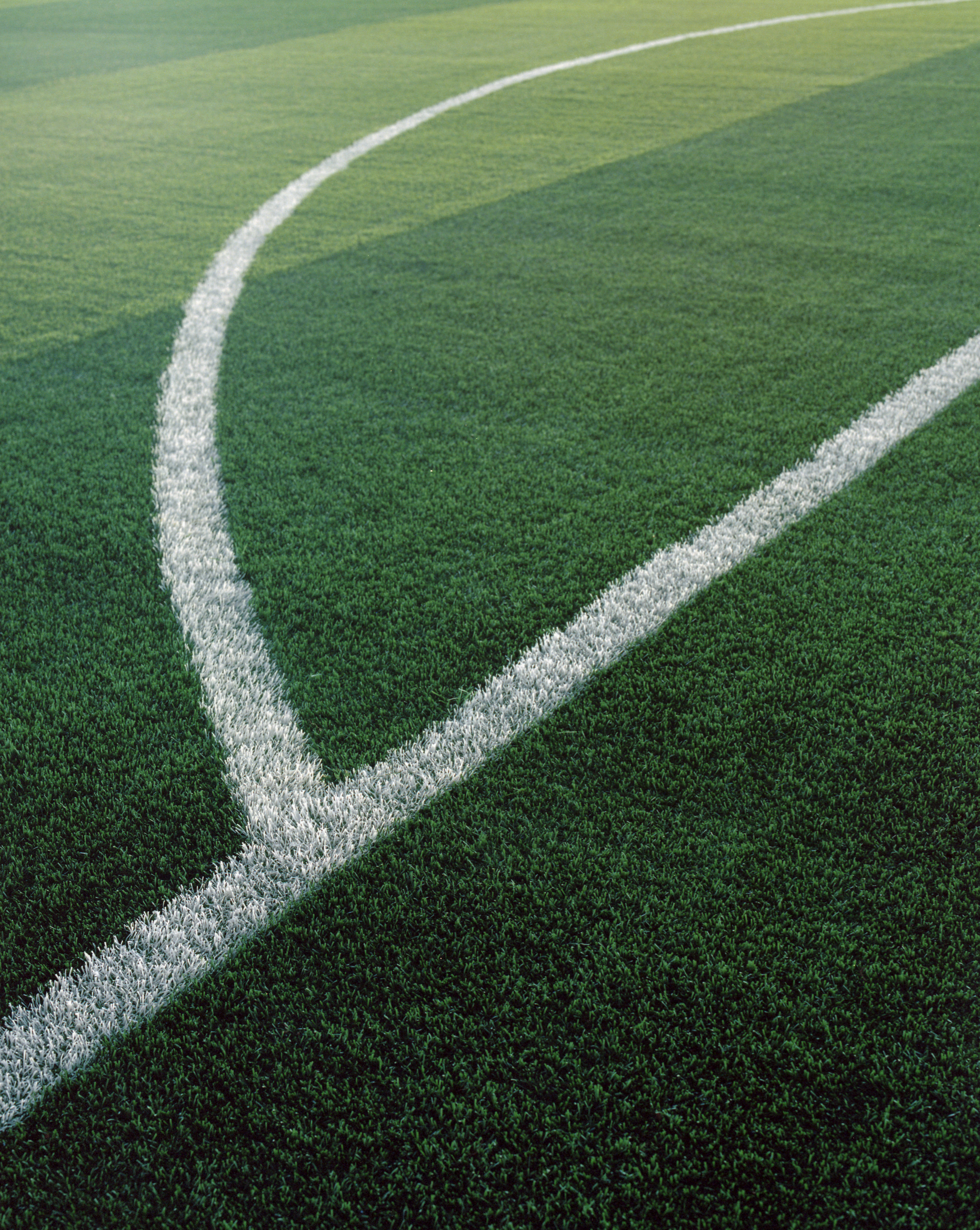
Penalty arc

Previously, penalty areas extended across the full width of the field; they were reduced to their current dimensions in 1901.

Penalty area through history

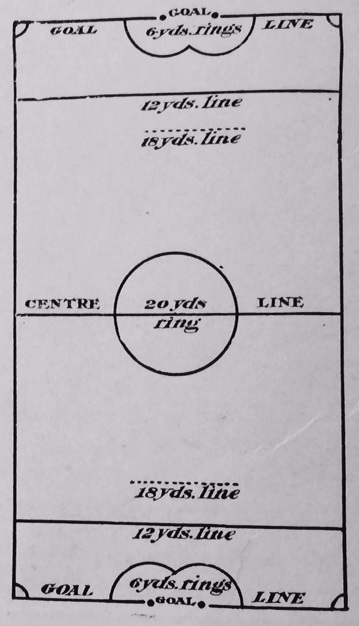
1892

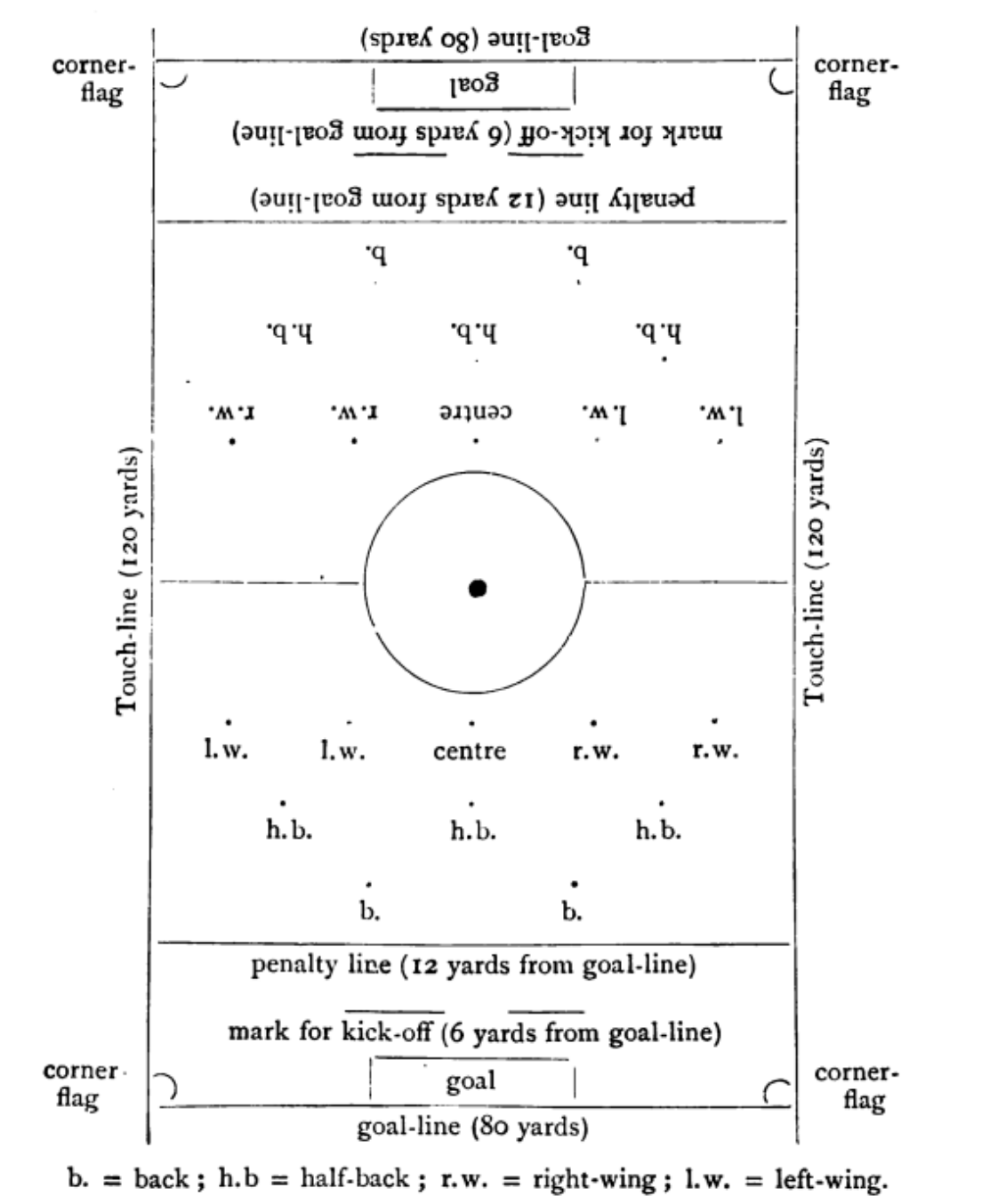
1898

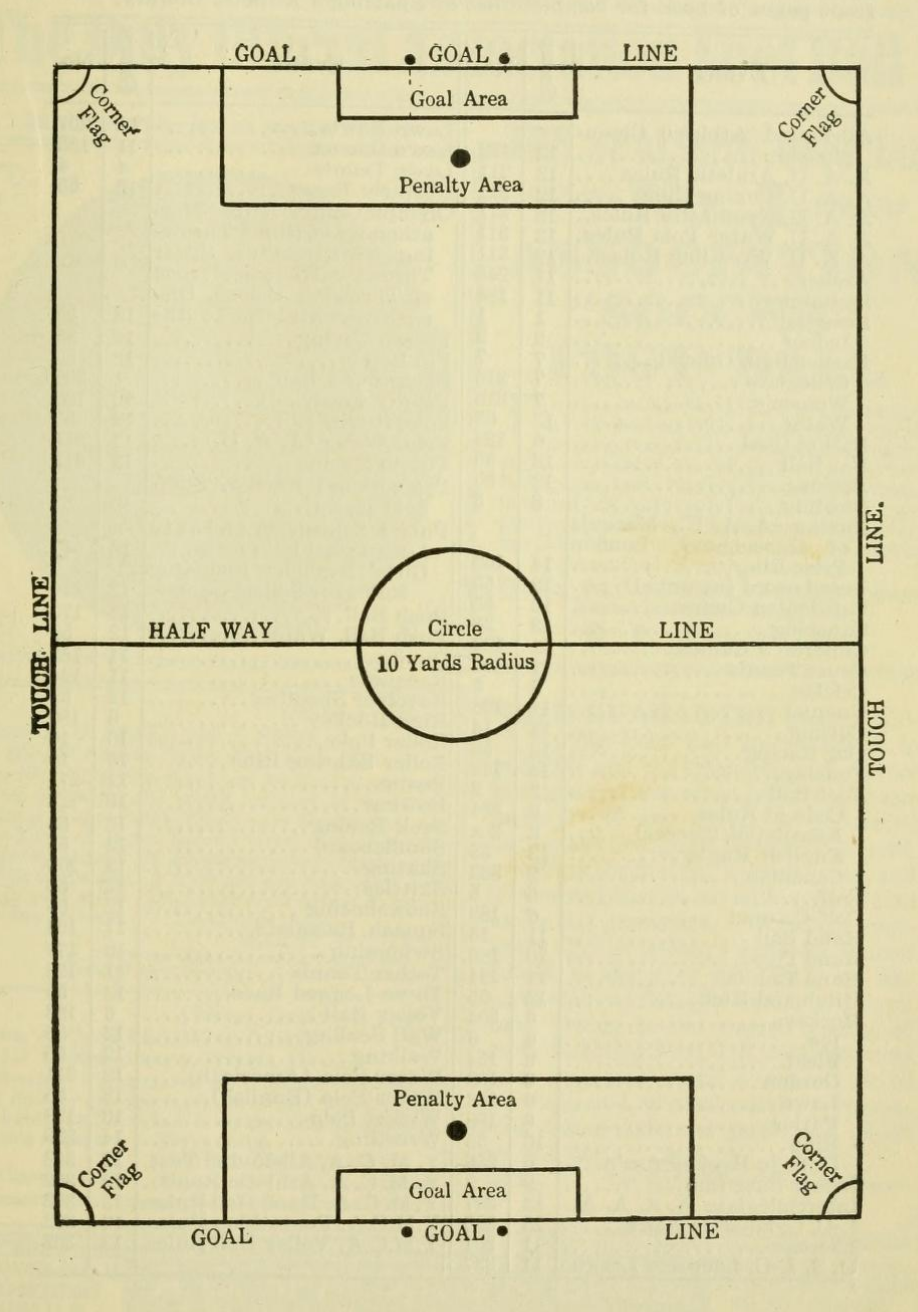
1902

== Functions ==
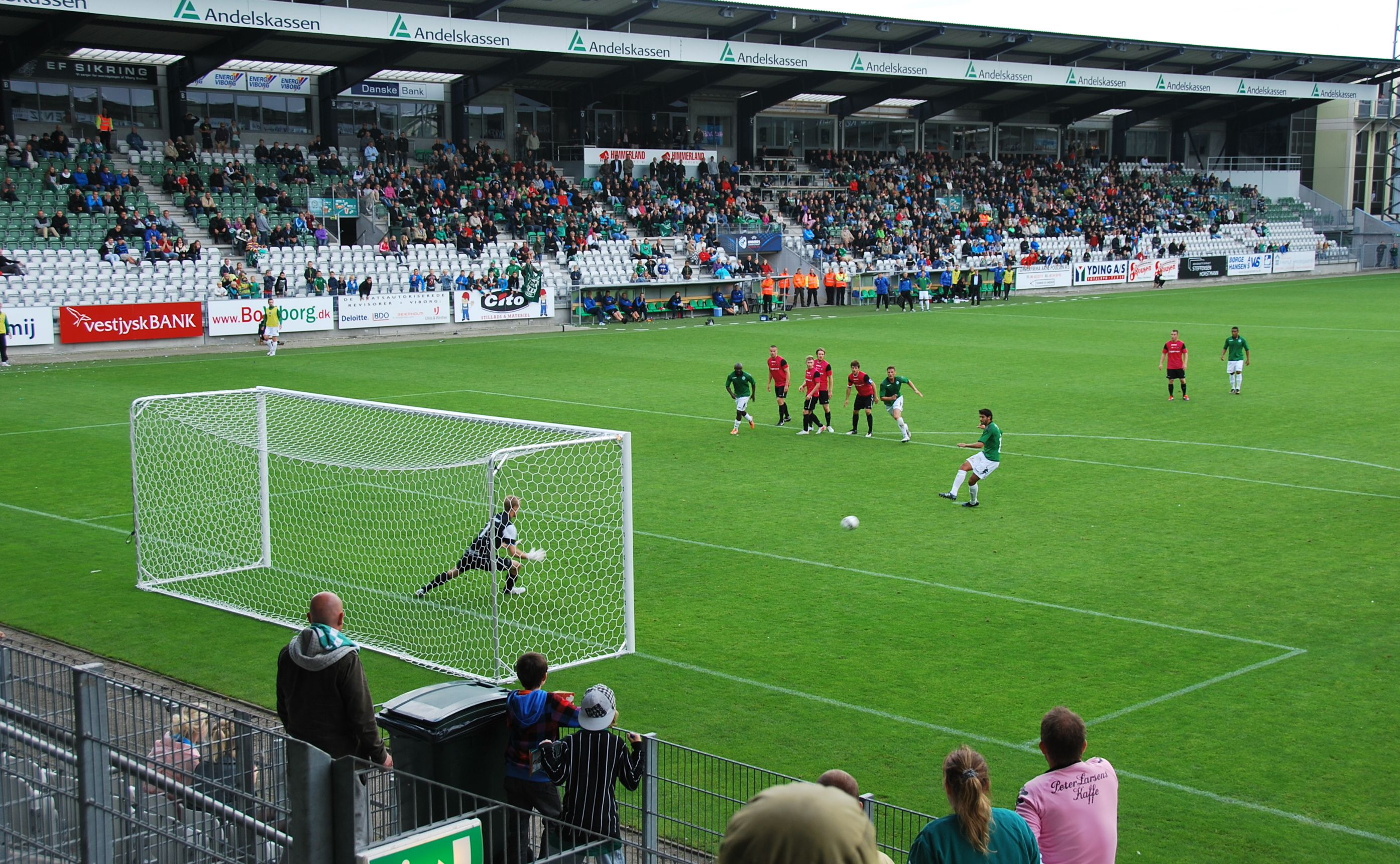
A player taking a penalty kick from inside the penalty area.

Fouls punishable by a direct free kick (i.e. handling the ball and most physical fouls), committed by the defensive team within the penalty area, may be penalised by a penalty kick. A penalty kick is taken from the penalty spot. The penalty spot is located 12 yards (11.0 m) away from the goal line.

The penalty area has other functions, including:

- Goalkeepers: The area in which a goalkeeper may legally handle the ball;
- Goal kicks and defensive free kicks: opponents must remain outside of the area and at least 10 yards away from the ball until the ball is kicked and clearly moves;
- Taking of penalty kicks: players other than the kicker and the goalkeeper must remain outside the area (and also the penalty arc) until the kick has been taken.

== In play ==
In a typical game, for the majority of time the penalty area is occupied only by the goalkeeper. The attacking team generally aims to get the ball and their own players into the defending team's penalty area, and a high percentage of goals in professional football are scored from within the penalty area. Usually during attacking set pieces, including corners, a large number of both attacking and defending players are in the penalty area and, although illegal, grappling between players is frequently observed.

== See also ==
- Penalty shoot-out (association football)
- Association football pitch
