= Penalty (rugby union) =

Disciplinary sanction in rugby union

A penalty in rugby union is the main disciplinary sanction available to the referee to penalise a team who commit deliberate infringements. The team who did not commit the infringement are given possession of the ball and they may either kick it towards touch (in which case the ball back rule is waived), attempt a place kick at goal, or tap the ball with their foot and run. It is also sometimes used as shorthand for penalty goal.

== Reasons to award a penalty ==
The referee signals that he has awarded a penalty to a side by raising his arm at 45 degrees between vertical and horizontal and blowing a blast on his whistle. The arm is raised on the side that won the penalty. Penalties may be awarded for a number of offences, including:

- Failing to release the ball after being tackled, or the tackling player failing to release the tackled player.
- Tackler not rolling away, to avoid obstructing the ball, if they are on the ground on the attacking team's side of the ruck.
- Entering a ruck or maul from the side.
- Using hands to grab or move the ball in a ruck, with the exception of the halfback, or player acting as halfback, in the team in possession.
- Leaving one's feet in the ruck.
- Deliberately collapsing a scrum or maul.
- Scrum infringements: not binding properly on an opponent (for prop forwards) or a teammate (for other players); leaving the scrum before the ball has emerged from it; not pushing straight against the opposing pack; collapsing scrum.
- Being offside and not making an effort to move to an onside position.
- Tackling infringements: a high tackle (where contact is made above the shoulders); tackling a player in the air or a player holding a teammate off the ground; tackling a player who does not have possession of the ball or tackling without trying to grasp the ball-carrier and bring him to ground (e.g. a shoulder charge or push).
- Violent or foul play: punching, elbowing, kicking, headbutting, tripping and so forth.
- Throwing or knocking the ball forwards, or out of play in any direction.
- Tackling or holding an opponent who is not in possession of the ball.
- Obstructing an opponent from tackling the ball-carrier (crossing).
- Not retreating ten metres at a penalty.
- Contesting or dissenting from a referee's decision, or using abusive language or conduct towards any match official.
- Any other action the referee considers to be "contrary to good sportsmanship" (such as throwing the ball away while play is stopped in order to prevent a prompt restart, especially if time is close to expiring).

Referees may not penalise some of these infringements if in their judgement the offending player had no intent to break the rules (e.g. a marginally late tackle on a player who has just kicked or passed the ball) or if the offending player was not participating in or affecting the game (e.g. a player who is in an offside position but not interfering with play). Equally, a referee may warn a team about technical infringements (especially at the scrum and ruck) before penalising them. A referee's willingness and ability to do so is a mark of good officiating in that it reduces stoppages in the game and allows the game to "flow".

== Restart options ==
The side that is awarded the penalty restarts the game with a kick or scrum at their option. If a kick is taken, the side that the penalty was awarded against must retreat 10 metres (or to their goal line if closer). There are four ways of restarting the game:

- A tap penalty, where a player drops the ball onto his foot and kicks it up into his arms and then carries the ball forward. This is often taken quickly to exploit lack of organisation in the opposition's retreating defence.
- A kick to touch. The side with the penalty gets the throw-in to the resultant line-out, from which they have a good chance of securing possession. This is used mainly to gain territory, though it is also used as a tactic to gain a platform for a rolling maul near the opponent's try line and muscle over for a score.
  - For most of the sport's history, the non-kicking team got the throw-in following a penalty kick going into touch. The current rule, which calls for the kicking team to get the throw-in, was not adopted until the early 1990s.
- A kick at goal. The kick at goal is usually taken off the ground from a plastic tee (though it is possible to drop kick the ball). If it is successful, they score three points, and the opposition restart from the centre line. (In rugby sevens, the scoring team restarts from the centre line.) If the penalty is missed but the ball remains in play, play continues. If the penalty is missed and the ball goes dead a 22 metre drop-out is awarded to the opposition.
- A scrum. A team may opt to have a scrum. This would normally be taken if an attacking team wished to have all the defensive forwards tied up in one place allowing the backs the luxury of a one on one confrontation. Alternatively, if a team has ascendancy in the scrums they may try for a pushover try, which may result in the award of a penalty try if the scrums are deliberately collapsed by the defending side.

== Cross-code comparisons ==
One of the laws associated with penalties was experimented with in association football, that being that penalties may be moved 10 metres forward of their original position either due to talk-back from the players or offside from a quick tap penalty. This was dropped after variable application by referees, but remains a rugby union rule.

A similar rule exists in Australian Rules: the 50-metre penalty moves the mark the approximate distance of a long mark, and is awarded for dissent and for slowing down or disrupting the restart.

== See also ==
- Free kick (rugby union)
- Offside (rugby)
- Professional foul
