= Goal from mark =

Scoring move in rugby football

A goal from mark is a former scoring move in rugby football. It occurred when a player "marked" the ball by making a fair catch and shouting "mark". From this position, the player could not be tackled. The player then had the option of a free kick, which could be taken as a place-kick, drop-kick, punt, or tap kick. It was possible to score a goal from a place-kick or drop-kick.

The goal from mark was seldom seen for several reasons: the kicking team would have had to make the mark comfortably within the range of the opponent's goal, usually implying a gross error on the part of a defending player. The player making the mark would presumably have considered a drop goal attempt from open play less likely to succeed than a goal from the mark. The defending team were allowed to advance as far as the mark, meaning that the kick had to be attempted from still further away, and were moreover permitted to charge the attempted kick as soon as the ball was placed on the ground, the kicker started to run up or offered to kick the ball. The points awarded for a goal from mark initially varied between three and four points as point scoring rules evolved in rugby. In the 1900s, the goal from mark was fixed at three points and it remained set at this amount until the rule's eventual abolition. The goal from mark was a goal-scoring option distinct from the drop goal. The latter was worth four points in rugby union until 1948 when its value was also reduced to three points.

Under the original laws promulgated by Rugby School (from 1845 onwards), a try behind the opposition's goal line was followed by a "punt out", in which a member of the attacking team punted the ball backwards from the goal-line to a teammate, who could then catch the ball, make a mark (as from a fair catch), and then place the ball for a kick at goal. This was originally the only means by which a goal could be scored following a try. The option of a place-kick in line with the try (as in a modern conversion) appeared in the first Rugby Football Union laws of 1871. The RFU would abolish the punt-out from goal in 1883.

The goal from mark was removed entirely from Rugby League in 1922. The goal from mark was permitted in Rugby Union games until the free-kick clause was added to the Laws of Rugby Union in 1977, which stipulated that a player could call a mark only in the defenders' 22-metre area and could only take a "non-scoring" free kick. This clause was applied to northern hemisphere games from September 1977 and for southern hemisphere games from January 1978 and remains part of the rules.

The last goal from a mark scored in an international match was by Romania against France in the 1971–72 FIRA Nations Cup on 11 December 1971.

== In other codes of football ==
The scoring move continues as the set shot featuring heavily in Australian rules football and in the unusual fair catch kick in American football. The original 1863 laws of Association Football also permitted a free kick from a fair catch, from which a goal could be scored; this provision was eliminated in 1866.

In late 2018, the Gaelic Athletic Association introduced an offensive mark to permit forward players, who had received an aerial pass which had travelled at least 20 metres, to stop play and essentially take a free kick. Despite some resistance, the rule was retained for the 2019 Irish National Football League season.

== See also ==
- Drop kick
- Free kick (rugby union)
- Mark (rugby)
- Fair catch kick
- Set shot
