= Free kick =

Action in several codes of football

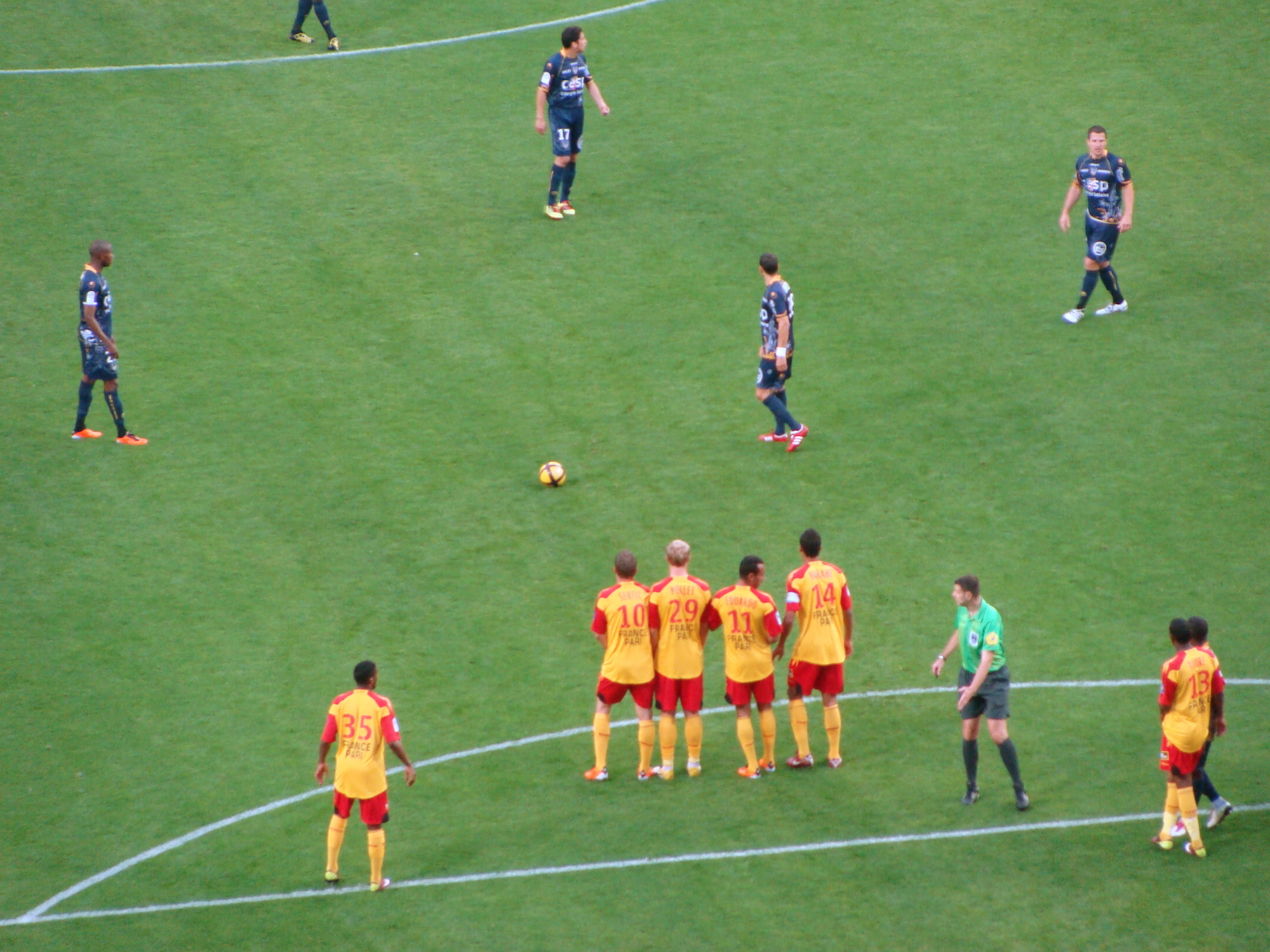
Set up for a free kick in Association football (soccer), with the opposing team forming a "wall" to block the kick.

A free kick is an action used in several codes of football to restart play with the kicking of a ball into the field of play.

== Association football ==
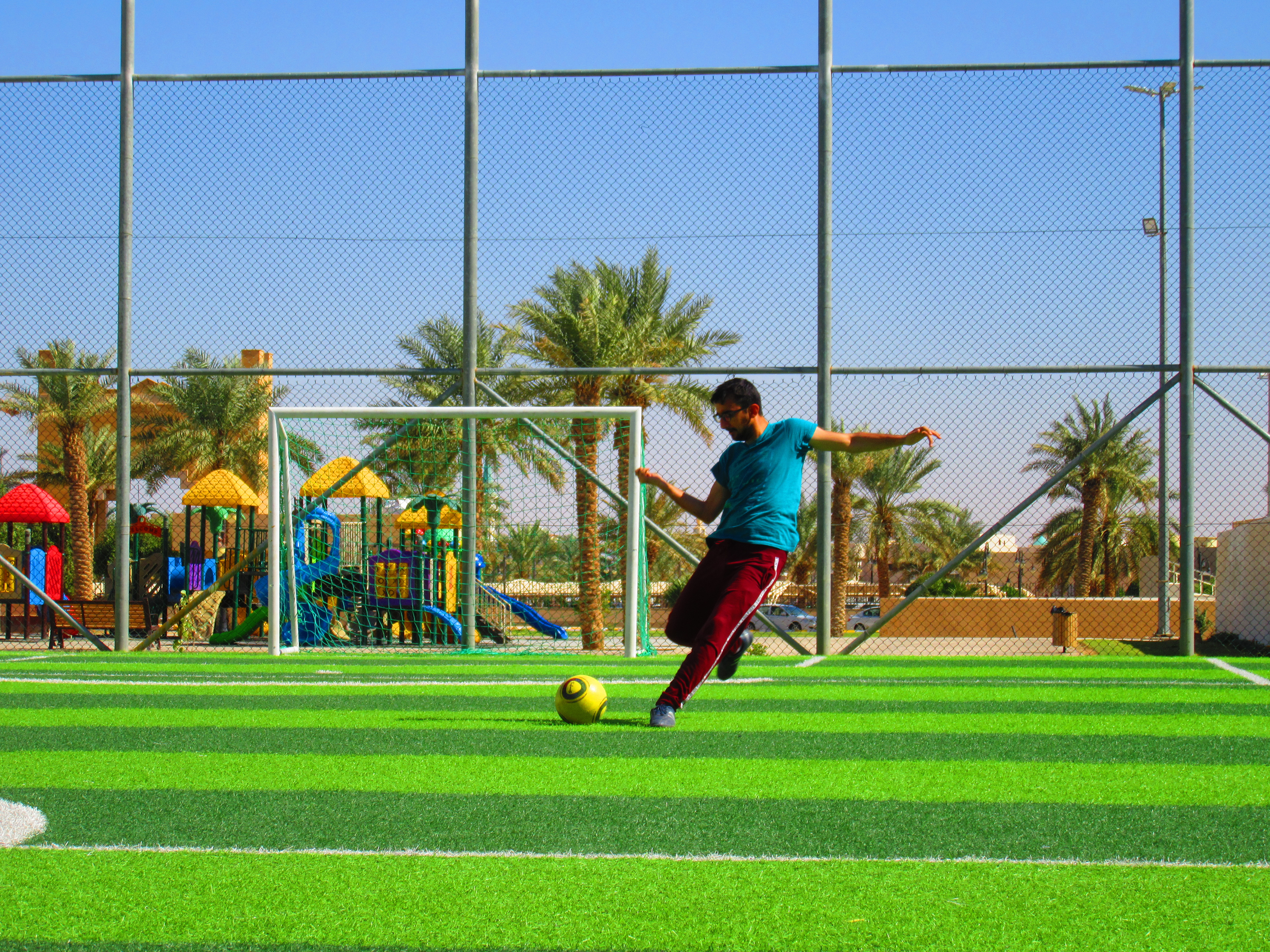
Freekick imitation

In association football, the free kick is a method of restarting the game following an offence by the opposing side.

For more serious offences, such as handball or serious foul play, a direct free kick is awarded, from which a goal may be scored directly against the opposing side. (If such an offence is committed in a team's own penalty area, a penalty kick is awarded instead).

For less serious offences, such as offside, an indirect free kick is awarded, from which the ball must touch another player before a goal is scored.

== Gridiron football ==
In American football, after a safety is scored, the ball is put into play by a free kick. The team that was scored upon must kick the ball from their own 20-yard line and can punt, drop kick, or place kick the ball. In professional play, a kicking tee cannot be used – however, a tee can be used in high school or college football. Once the ball has been kicked, it can be caught and advanced by any member of the receiving team, and it can be recovered by the kicking team if the ball travels at least 10 yards and bounces at least once or a player of the receiving team touches the ball.

In Canadian football, after scoring a safety touch, the scoring team has the option of taking control of the ball and beginning play from their own 35-yard line, kicking the ball off from their 35-yard line, or accepting a kickoff from the 25-yard line of the team that conceded the score. If a kickoff is chosen it must be a place kick, and the ball can be held, placed on the ground, or placed on a tee prior to the kick. As in American football, the ball must go at least ten yards before it can be recovered by the kicking team.

Another example occurring in American football is the fair catch kick, a field goal attempted freely from the spot of a fair catch. Although the National Football League (NFL) does not consider the play a free kick, the National Federation of State High School Associations (NFHS) and media analysts regard it as being a free kick. The kick must be either a place kick or a drop kick, and if it passes over the crossbar and between the goalposts of the defensive team's goal, a field goal, worth three points, is scored to the offensive team.

Under NFHS rules, kickoffs are also classified as free kicks.

== Australian rules football ==
A free kick in Australian rules football is awarded after a player commits a penalty. The player must then kick the ball back to the other team. When a free kick is awarded, the player's opponent stands the mark, standing on the spot where the umpire indicates that the free kick was paid or mark was taken. The player with the ball then retreats backwards so that the ball can be kicked over the player standing the mark; the player must retreat on the angle such that he, the man on the mark and the centre of the attacking goal are in the same straight line.

== Rugby union ==
A free kick in rugby union is usually awarded to a team for a technical offence committed by the opposing side. Once awarded a free kick, the team must decide how they wish to play it. Options include choosing to play a place kick, drop kick, punt, or take it as a scrum.
