= Fair catch =

American football rule

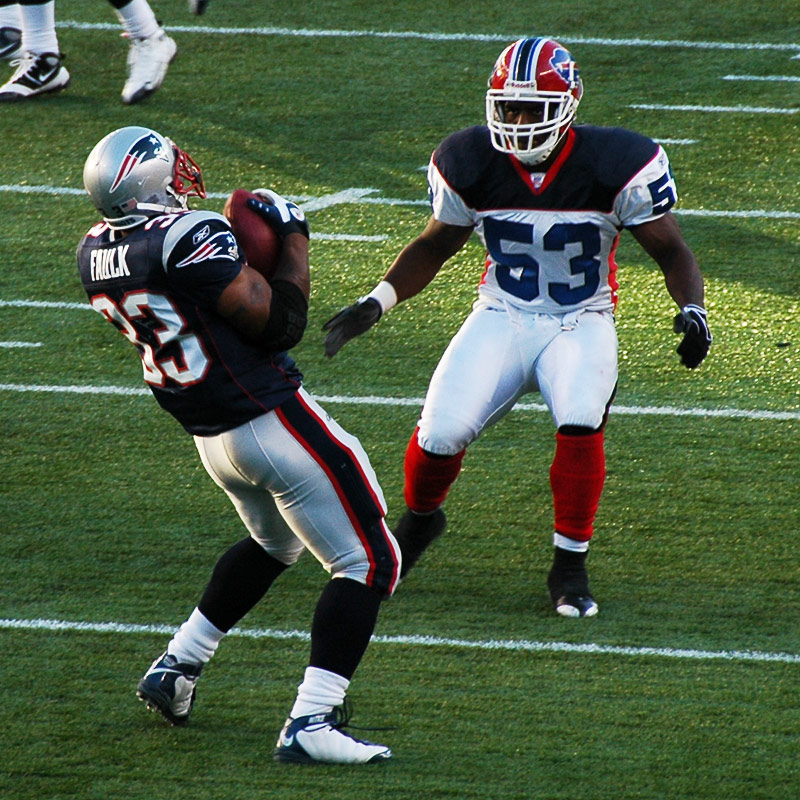
A fair catch of a punt in American football

A fair catch is a feature of American football and several other codes of football, in which a player attempting to catch a ball kicked by the opposing team – either on a kickoff or punt – is entitled to catch the ball without interference from any member of the kicking team. A player, usually a return specialist, wishing to make a fair catch signals his intent by extending one arm above his head and waving it while the kicked ball is in flight. A ball caught in this manner becomes dead once caught, i.e., the player catching the ball is not entitled to advance the ball, and the receiving team begins its drive at the spot where the ball was caught.

Since 2018, the National Collegiate Athletic Association (NCAA) has had a touchback provision where fair catches caught anywhere inside the 25-yard line on a kickoff are placed at the 25 for the ensuing drive. In 2023, the National Football League (NFL) adopted the same rule in order to reduce the frequency of player injuries on kickoffs. Under NFL and National Federation of State High School Associations (NFHS) rules, a team awarded a fair catch is also entitled to attempt a fair catch kick from the spot of the catch; however, this is rarely done.

The main reason for a fair catch is to protect the receiver. Because the receiver has to direct his attention toward catching the airborne ball, he cannot focus on opponents running towards him and is usually not in a position to protect himself immediately when he catches the ball, and is therefore particularly vulnerable to injury from being hit by an opponent. He is also at risk for fumbling or muffing the kicked ball if the punter intentionally makes a high short kick to allow defenders time to hit the receiver. A second reason for a fair catch, on a punted ball, is to prevent the ball from rolling toward the receiving team's goal and being downed deep in the team's own territory.

== Variations ==
=== NFL and NFHS rules ===
The receiving team on a kickoff or punt is always entitled to an unobstructed attempt to catch the ball in its initial flight, before it is touched by a player or it hits the ground. However, unless a fair catch is called, the player catching the ball may legally be hit or tackled once he catches the ball, and is thus prone to injury and fumbling the ball, particularly if he has not had a chance to protect his body or the ball.

A member of the team attempting to catch a punt or kickoff may signal for a fair catch. To request a fair catch, the receiver must raise one arm fully above their head and wave it from side to side while the ball is in flight. Once the signal is given, the kicking team may not interfere with the receiver's attempt to catch the ball. A player who performs a successful fair catch cannot be tackled or hit: once caught, the ball is dead and, barring any penalties, the receiving team begins their drive from spot of the catch. They also have the option of trying a fair catch kick from that spot, though there have only been six fair catch kick attempts in the 21st century NFL and only one of those was successful. If the ball is not caught, then the fair catch is void and all other rules on kicked balls apply.

In 2023, a new rule was adopted by the NFL that allowed kickoff returners who call for a fair catch inside the 25-yard line to be awarded a touchback and have the ball placed at the 25 for the drive, instead of at the spot of the catch. This rule, which went into effect at the start of the 2023 NFL season, applies only to kickoffs. The NFL estimated that kickoff returns would decrease by seven percent with the new fair catch rule, leading to a 15 percent drop in concussions on those plays.

==== Penalties ====
If a member of the kicking team interferes with a fair catch attempt after the receiver gives a proper signal, the kicking team is penalized 15 yards from the spot of the foul, and a fair catch is awarded even if the ball is not caught. In the NFL, the receiving team has the option to attempt a fair catch kick from the location where the ball is spotted after the penalty is assessed.

If the receiver fails to give a proper signal (hand raised above helmet but not waved side to side), the receiving team is penalized 5 yards from the spot of the signal for an invalid fair catch signal, a fair catch is not awarded, and the receiver is not protected from being tackled.

If the receiver initiates contact with any member of the kicking team after giving a fair catch signal but before the ball is touched by another player, the receiving team is penalized 15 yards.

If the receiver signals a fair catch before the ball is caught, and runs after the ball is caught, then the run is immediately stopped, with a 5 yard penalty against the receiving team from where the ball is caught.

=== NCAA rules ===
NCAA rules on fair catches are similar to NFL and NFHS rules, a fair catch from a kickoff that is caught between the receiving team's goal line and its 25-yard line is a touchback.

The NCAA abolished the fair catch in 1950 but reinstated it in 1951 without the fair catch kick option. In 2018, the additional touchback provision was added. In 2026 the fair catch kick option was reinstated.

=== Canadian football and arena football ===
Both the 2001 and 2020 versions of the XFL removed the fair catch in an effort to attract fans who disliked the rule. Canadian football and arena football also do not have fair catch rules, with the XFL and Canadian football preferring a five-yard "no-yards" rule instead, where the cover team is penalized 15 yards if they invade a five-yard perimeter around the returner as they field a punt.

== Other games ==
Various forms of football descended from certain English school football games of the 19th century have had a fair catch. It was abolished early in the development of soccer, then in the middle of the 20th century by Canadian football, and slightly later by rugby league. Forms of football retaining a form of fair catch (also called "mark") include American (outdoor), rugby union, and Australian rules. The American-invented intramural games speedball and speedaway have some of the flavor of the original fair catch, which was to allow handling of the ball in games where handling was otherwise forbidden. Australian rules, speedball, and speedaway do not require that the kick be from an opponent. American football requires that the catcher signal in advance, as did Canadian football before that game abolished the fair catch. Rugby union requires a player to signal a fair catch by catching the ball and shouting "Mark!".

In some forms of football a player fielding an opponent's kick must be given a certain circular unobstructed space around him in which to do so by either some or all opponents. In rugby union, rugby league, and Canadian football this applies only against members of the kicking team who are offside, and applies whether the ball is in the air, bouncing, or rolling. In Arena Football, there is no fair catch; however all members of the kicking team must refrain from penetrating the five-yard line in coverage, but only while the ball is in the air. In the Australian Football League's variant of Australian rules football AFL 9s there is the concept of the "drop-zone" to protect players so that they may make a fair catch.

The various games differ as to the conditions under which a fair catch will be awarded — for example, whether the ball must be caught "cleanly", i.e. without juggling. Rugby union requires a clean catch. American football allows the ball to be juggled, but not to be intentionally batted forward to improve the position of the catch (as for a free kick at goal). Australian rules is most generous, allowing unlimited hand play with the ball before it is caught, and allowing the kick to be from any other player, regardless of team (however, the ball must have travelled 15 metres) and the ball can even be dropped so long as the player is deemed to have sufficient control of its fall. In the 19th century in rugby, and into the 20th in American and Canadian football, a fair catch was allowed from certain kicks of a teammate—a punt-out or punt-on.
