= Fair catch kick =

American football rule regarding attempting free kicks after fair catches

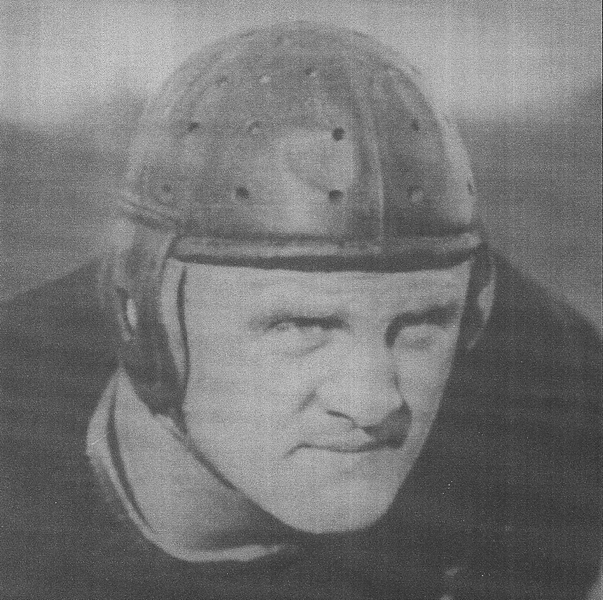
Elmer Oliphant holds the record for most fair catch kicks and attempts, with two goals on four attempts, all in 1921.

The fair catch kick is a rule in American football that allows a team that has just made a fair catch to attempt a free kick (Note: Although the National Football League (NFL) does not consider the play a free kick, the National Federation of State High School Associations (NFHS) and media analysts regard it as being a free kick.) from the spot of the catch. The kick must be either a place kick or a drop kick, and if it passes over the crossbar and between the goalposts of the opposing team's goal, a field goal, worth three points, is awarded to the kicking team. The fair catch kick has its origins in rugby football's goal from mark, which has since been abolished in both major rugby codes; a similar rule, the mark, is a major part of Australian rules football.

The fair catch kick is considered to be an obscure rule and it is rarely attempted. Because most fair catches are made well out of field goal range, and a team making a fair catch has possession of the ball and a first down, it is rarely to a team's advantage to attempt a fair catch kick rather than run a play from scrimmage. A team may attempt a fair catch kick if it makes a fair catch when the clock expires at the end of either half, as a half must be extended in order to allow a fair catch kick attempt. At the professional level, the most recent successful fair catch kick (as well as the most recent attempt) was made on December 19, 2024, by Cameron Dicker of the Los Angeles Chargers against the Denver Broncos. Prior to that, the last successful attempt occurred in 1976, though there were nine unsuccessful attempts during the years in between.

== Rule ==
The fair catch kick rule states that, after a player has made a fair catch or has been awarded a fair catch as the result of a penalty such as kick catch interference, their team can attempt a kick from the spot of the catch; the National Federation of State High School Associations (NFHS) rulebook also allows a kick to be made if the down following the fair catch or awarded fair catch has to be replayed. Prior to the kick, the opposing team must be lined up at least ten yards beyond the spot of the ball. The kick itself can be either a place kick or drop kick; a kicking tee cannot be used at the professional level, but use of a tee up to two inches in height is permitted at the high school level. Like other field goal attempts, the kicking team is awarded three points if the kick goes above the crossbar and between the goalposts of the opposing team's goal and did not touch a player of the kicking team after the kick. If the attempt fails, the opposing team is awarded control of the ball from the spot of the kick. The opposing team can also return the kick if it does not go out of bounds.

In the NFHS rulebook, the fair catch kick is specifically defined as a free kick. The National Football League (NFL) rulebook specifically states that the fair catch kick is not a free kick, instead considering the fair catch kick to be a distinct type of kick. Despite this, reporters at both levels describe the fair catch kick as a free kick.

The XFL (2020) and UFL rulebook defines the fair catch kick separately from the free kick. Under the XFL rules, a fair catch kick cannot itself be returned and the play ends when either team secures possession of the ball; the formation is executed under the XFL's rules for an onside kick, which are separate from those of the XFL's standard kickoff formation.

The NCAA readopted the fair catch kick beginning with the 2026 college football season, as did high school football in Texas.

== History ==
The fair catch kick found in American football originated in rugby football. A similar rule in rugby, the goal from mark, allowed a player who had fair caught a ball to attempt an uncontested free kick from the spot of the fair catch. Both major codes of rugby have eliminated the rule: rugby league abolished the goal from mark in 1922, and rugby union removed it in 1977. Australian rules football has retained the rule, and it is a vital part of the Australian game; a "fair catch" of a ball kicked more than 15 meters in the air is called a mark, and the player making the mark is then awarded a free kick. The fair catch kick has been present in the NFL rulebook since the league's inception, and also remains in the NFHS rulebook. The National Collegiate Athletic Association (NCAA) abolished the fair catch in 1950, but re-added it a year later. When the fair catch returned to the rulebook, however, the option to attempt a kick after the fair catch was removed. In 2026, the NCAA re-implemented the fair catch kick rule in Division I football, plus high school football in Texas.

== Usage ==
The fair catch kick rule is very rarely invoked, and it is one of the rarest plays in football. The rule has been regarded as "obscure", "bizarre", and "quirky". A unique set of circumstances is required for a fair catch kick to be a viable option. For one, the fair catch would need to be made at a point on the field where a field goal attempt has a reasonable chance of being successful; most fair catches are made well outside of field goal range.

Furthermore, for a fair catch kick to be a viable option near the end of the fourth quarter, the team attempting the kick needs to be either tied or behind by three points or fewer; even if such a situation were to occur, a coach might still decline to attempt a fair catch kick. For example, New England Patriots head coach Bill Belichick, known for his knowledge and utilization of obscure football rules, declined the opportunity to attempt a 75-yard fair catch kick at the end of regulation in Super Bowl LI. Although kicker Stephen Gostkowski was able to kick the ball that far and the game was tied, Belichick felt the risk of a return touchdown by the opposing team off a failed kick outweighed the opportunity to score from the kick. Art McNally, who led the officiating department of the National Football League from 1968 to 1990, said that even in the event a fair catch is made within field goal range, most teams would attempt to score a touchdown unless there is not enough time left to score one. Accordingly, most fair catch kick attempts occur when a team has fair-caught a ball from a punt from deep in their opponent's territory but there is not enough time left in the half to go for a touchdown.

Despite its drawbacks, there are several unique advantages to using the fair catch kick. Because the play does not start until the ball is kicked, the kicker can take a running start before kicking as opposed to the typical two steps taken on regular field goal attempts. Similarly, the kicker does not have to worry about a low snap because the ball is not snapped. Because the defense cannot come within 10 yards of the kicker before the ball is kicked, the kicker can give the ball a lower trajectory than a field goal kick from scrimmage without the threat of it being blocked. The fair catch kick would also be of a shorter distance than a normal field goal attempt from the same spot, because the fair catch kick is taken from the spot of the catch, while a typical field goal is taken seven yards behind the line of scrimmage.

== Known attempts ==
=== NFL ===
The NFL does not keep a record of fair catch kick attempts, so the exact number of attempts is unknown. Out of the 33 recorded fair catch kick attempts in regular season and postseason games, ten were successful; all five known attempts in exhibition games were unsuccessful. Since 1933, all known fair catch kick attempts were made within the last 30 seconds of either the 2nd or 4th quarter. The last attempt was made on December 19, 2024, by Cameron Dicker of the Los Angeles Chargers. At 57 yards, it is the longest successful kick to date.

=== Regular season and post-season games ===
List of known fair catch kick attempts in regular and post-season games
Date	Kicker	Kicking team	Opponent	Yards	Result	Game time	Note(s)	Reference(s)
October 10, 1920	Heinie Miller	Buffalo All-Americans	All-Buffalo†	15	Good	4th quarter	Attempt followed 15-yard penalty for kick catch interference. Non-league opponent.	
October 9, 1921	Elmer Oliphant	Buffalo All-Americans	Columbus Panhandles	37	Good	2nd quarter		
October 16, 1921	Elmer Oliphant	Buffalo All-Americans	New York Brickley Giants	32	Good	2nd quarter		
November 6, 1921	Curly Lambeau	Green Bay Packers	Evansville Crimson Giants	35	Good	2nd quarter	Made after a "sky high" punt that went only about 25 yards.	
November 13, 1921	Elmer Oliphant	Buffalo All-Americans	Akron Pros	30	Missed	3rd quarter	Attempt followed 15-yard penalty for kick catch interference.	
November 20, 1921	Elmer Oliphant	Buffalo All-Americans	Canton Bulldogs	24	Missed	2nd quarter		
November 9, 1924	Benny Boynton	Buffalo Bisons	Kenosha Maroons	42	Missed	1st quarter	Ball landed in field of play and Buffalo recovered at 7 yard line, being live under contemporary rules.	
November 8, 1925	George Abramson	Green Bay Packers	Chicago Cardinals	35	Missed	4th quarter	Game played in snow on a muddy field.	
November 26, 1933	Ken Strong	New York Giants	Green Bay Packers	30	Good	3rd quarter		
October 23, 1955	Ben Agajanian	New York Giants	Pittsburgh Steelers	56	Missed	2nd quarter (0:30)		
November 2, 1958	Gordy Soltau	San Francisco 49ers	Detroit Lions	61	Missed	2nd quarter (0:15)		
September 13, 1964	Sam Baker	Philadelphia Eagles	New York Giants	47	Missed	2nd quarter (0:00)		
September 13, 1964	Paul Hornung	Green Bay Packers	Chicago Bears	52	Good	2nd quarter (0:00)		
December 4, 1966	Fred Cox	Minnesota Vikings	Atlanta Falcons	40	Good	2nd quarter (0:00)		
November 23, 1967	Bruce Gossett	Los Angeles Rams	Detroit Lions	55	Missed	2nd quarter (0:03)		
November 3, 1968	Mac Percival	Chicago Bears	Green Bay Packers	43	Good	4th quarter (0:20)	Game-winning field goal	
December 8, 1968	Fred Cox	Minnesota Vikings	San Francisco 49ers	47	Missed	2nd quarter (0:00)		
October 5, 1969	Curt Knight	Washington Redskins	San Francisco 49ers	56	Missed	4th quarter (0:02)	The game finished as a 17–17 tie.	
November 23, 1969	Tom Dempsey	New Orleans Saints	San Francisco 49ers	57	Missed	2nd quarter (0:00)		
December 21, 1969	Sam Baker	Philadelphia Eagles	San Francisco 49ers	49	Missed	2nd quarter (0:00)		
November 1, 1970	Curt Knight	Washington Redskins	Denver Broncos	49	Missed	2nd quarter (0:00)		
November 8, 1971	David Ray	Los Angeles Rams	Baltimore Colts	45	Missed	2nd quarter (0:00)		
November 21, 1976	Ray Wersching	San Diego Chargers	Buffalo Bills	45	Good	2nd quarter (0:00)		
November 25, 1979	Mark Moseley	Washington Redskins	New York Giants	74	Missed	4th quarter	Longest field goal attempt on record until 2008.	
September 29, 1980	Fred Steinfort	Denver Broncos	New England Patriots	73	Missed	2nd quarter (0:00)		
November 18, 1984	Raul Allegre	Indianapolis Colts	New England Patriots	61	Missed	2nd quarter (0:00)	Fair catch was made on a botched squib kick.	
January 1, 1989	Mike Cofer	San Francisco 49ers	Minnesota Vikings	60	Missed	2nd quarter (0:00)	NFC Divisional Playoff game	
October 9, 2005	Rob Bironas	Tennessee Titans	Houston Texans	58	Missed	2nd quarter (0:00)		
November 23, 2008	Neil Rackers	Arizona Cardinals	New York Giants	68	Missed	2nd quarter (0:05)		
December 28, 2008	Mason Crosby	Green Bay Packers	Detroit Lions	69	Missed	2nd quarter (0:00)	Ball was on target but fell just short of the crossbar.	
September 26, 2013	Phil Dawson	San Francisco 49ers	St. Louis Rams	71	Missed	2nd quarter (0:04)		
October 13, 2019	Joey Slye	Carolina Panthers	Tampa Bay Buccaneers	60	Missed	2nd quarter (0:01)	Game played in London	
December 19, 2024	Cameron Dicker	Los Angeles Chargers	Denver Broncos	57	Good	2nd quarter (0:00)	Longest recorded successful fair catch kick. Attempt followed 15-yard penalty for fair catch interference.	

=== Exhibition games ===
List of known fair catch kick attempts in exhibition games
Date	Kicker	Kicking team	Opponent	Yards	Result	Game time	Note(s)	Reference(s)
January 9, 1966	Lou Michaels	Baltimore Colts	Dallas Cowboys	57	Missed	2nd quarter (0:00)	Playoff Bowl game (Note: The Playoff Bowl matched up the runners-up of the NFL's two conferences; although the game was effectively for third-place in the league, the NFL considers Playoff Bowl games to have been exhibition games, not playoff games.)	
July 29, 1972	Chester Marcol	College All-Stars	Dallas Cowboys	68	Missed	2nd quarter (0:00)	Chicago College All-Star Game	
August 9, 1972	Mac Percival	Chicago Bears	Houston Oilers	60	Missed	4th quarter (0:15)		
August 31, 1986	Rafael Septién	Dallas Cowboys	Houston Oilers	53	Missed	4th quarter (0:00)		
August 8, 1993	Chris Gardocki	Chicago Bears	Philadelphia Eagles	63	Missed	2nd quarter (0:00)		

=== College football ===
Like the NFL the NCAA does not keep a record of fair catch kick attempts. Out of the 28 recorded fair catch kick attempts, all of which were in the regular season, 16 were successful.

List of known fair catch kick attempts in regular and post-season games
Date	Kicker	Kicking team	Opponent	Yards	Result	Game time	Note(s)	Reference(s)
November 7, 1899	George H Young	Cornell Big Red	Columbia Lions	18	Good	2nd half	First recorded fair catch kick in college football.	
December 2, 1899	Rex Kilpatrick	Sewanee Tigers	UNC Tarheels	20	Good	1st half	With this win Sewanee finished the season 12-0 in the Southern Intercollegiate Athletic Association (SIAA).	
November 11, 1900	Jim Wear	Yale Bulldogs	Carlisle Indians	40	Missed	unknown		
October 18, 1902	Thomas A. Barry	Brown Bears	Penn Quakers	30	Missed	2nd half	Blocked by Sol Metzger	
November 8, 1902	John S. Grogan	Knox College Old Siwash	Notre Dame Fighting Irish	unknown	Good	2nd half		
November 14, 1903	Thomas Doe	Army Cadets	Chicago Maroons	25	Good	2nd half	Gave winning kick.	
October 7, 1905	Walter Brubaker	Carleton Knights	East Side High School of Minneapolis	30	Good	2nd half		
October 7, 1905	George Elmore McMaster	Washington Huskies	Whitworth Pirates	unknown	Good	2nd half	Fair catch kick taken from center field. McMaster attempted a second fair catch kick later in the half but missed.	
October 20, 1906	Thomas	Coe Kohawks	Grinnell Pioneers	35	Good	1st half		
October 27, 1906	Arthur McGaughey	Indiana Hoosier	Chicago Maroons	40 or 30	Good	1st half		
October 31, 1906	Webb	Franklin Fighting Baptists	Wabash Little Giants	20	Good	2nd half	Wabash outscored Franklin 87-5.	
October 26, 1907	Jim McCormick	Princeton Tigers	Cornell Big Red	42	Missed	2nd half	If made would have won Princeton the game.	
November 25, 1909	Everett Booe	Davidson Wildcats	VMI Keydets	35	Good	1st half		
October 7, 1911	Elmer McDevitt	Yale Bulldogs	Syracuse Orange	43	Missed	4th quarter		
November 7, 1914	Travis Williams	Indiana Hoosiers	Ohio State Buckeyes	38	Missed	1st half		
November 6, 1920	Collins	Baylor Bears	Texas A&M Aggies	37	Missed	4th quarter		
November 13, 1920	Stan Keck	Princeton Tigers	Yale Bulldogs	34	Good	2nd half		
September 23, 1922	Hal Griggs	Butler Bulldogs	Wilmington Quakers	30	Good	1st quarter		
October 20, 1923	Jack Blott	Michigan Wolverines	Ohio State Buckeyes	41	Missed	1st quarter	20th playing of the Michigan–Ohio State football rivalry.	
November 14, 1925	Lester Sherman	Washington Huskies	California Golden Bears	26	Missed	2nd quarter		
November 21, 1925	Louis Briner	Indiana Hoosiers	Purdue Boilermakers	23	Missed	1st half		
October 2, 1926	unknown	Maryville Scots	Kenutcky Wildcats	unknown	Missed	1st quarter	The Lexington Herald-Leader only says that Maryville attempted, and failed, a fair catch kick.	
October 30, 1926	Volney Hill	Texas Tech Matadors	TCU Horned Frogs	42	Good	1st quarter	This was the first meeting between TCU and Texas Tech.	
November 13, 1926	Gerald Mann	SMU Mustangs	Baylor Bears	32	Good	1st quarter	The Houston Chronicle says that the fair catch rule was implemented that season, 1926.	
November 4, 1933	Barton Cummings	Illinois Fighting Illini	Michigan Wolverines	31	Missed	4th quarter	Missed wide left.	
October 14, 1939	Bob Kemnitz	Marquette Hilltoppers	Michigan State Spartans	15	Good	4th quarter	Game winning kick.	
September 12, 2026	Brendan McGonigle	Montclair State Red Hawks	Lycoming Warriors	40	Missed	4th quarter	First attempted fair catch kick since the rule was reinstated in 2026.	
October 31, 2026	Kaleb Wayt	Johns Hopkins Blue Jays	Muhlenberg Mules	39	Good	4th quarter	First successful fair catch kick since the rule was reinstated in 2026.	

== Notes ==
Notes

Footnotes
