= Free kick (rugby union) =

A free kick in rugby union is usually awarded to a team for a technical offence committed by the opposing side. Free kicks are awarded for technical offences such as playing too many players in a line-out or time wasting at a scrum. A free kick is also awarded for making a mark.

Once awarded a free kick the team must decide how they wish to play it.

- The team may opt to play a place kick, where the ball is placed on the ground by the kicker at a point designated by the referee then the player may take a run up to the ball and kick it downfield but not into touch (law 21.4 (e)). This is very rarely chosen.
- They may opt for a drop kick, where the ball starts in the player's hands and is dropped onto the ground whereupon it is kicked downfield on its upward bounce by the player.
- They may opt for a punt, where the ball starts in the player's hands and is dropped and kicked without bouncing.
- They may opt to play a tap kick. A tap kick is played when the team feel they would benefit more from keeping possession of the ball rather than kicking it downfield. To play a tap kick, the player either places the ball on the ground and kicks it a small distance, or punts it back into his own hands. The ball must travel a visible distance.
- A team awarded a free kick at a lineout may choose a further lineout into which they throw in.

The team in possession cannot directly score a goal from the free kick itself, nor score a dropped goal until the ball has become dead or an opponent has touched the ball or tackled a ball carrier. This also applies if the team in possession opts for a scrum. Unlike a penalty kick, if the ball goes into touch from a free kick then the kicking team enjoys no special privileges; the line-out is taken by the opposing team rather than the kicking team, and a direct kick to touch from outside the 22-metre area results in this line-out being formed opposite where the ball was kicked, not where it crossed the touch-line.

Furthermore, the defending team can attempt to charge the kick as long as they have first retreated 10m. If they prevent the kick from being taken this way, they win a scrum.

== See also ==
- Drop kick
- Penalty
- Scrum
