= Football (word) =

Any one of several team sports

The English word football may mean any one of several team sports (or the ball used in that respective sport), depending on the national or regional origin and location of the person using the word; the use of the word football usually refers to the most popular code of football in that region. The sports most frequently referred to as simply football are American football, association football, Australian rules football, Canadian football, Gaelic football, rugby league football and rugby union football.

Of the 45 national FIFA (Fédération Internationale de Football Association) affiliates in which English is an official or primary language, 43 use football in their organisations' official names, while Canada and the United States use soccer. In those two countries, other codes of football are dominant, and soccer is the prevailing term for association football. In 2005, Australia's association football governing body changed its name from soccer to football to align with the general international usage of the term. In 2006, New Zealand decided to follow suit.

There are also many other languages where the common term for association football is phonetically similar to the English term football. (See Names for association football.)

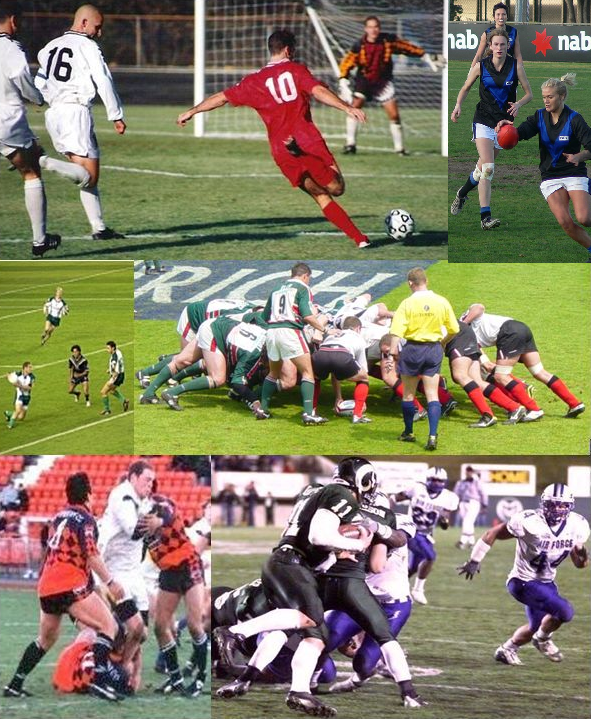
Some of the many different codes of football

== Etymology ==
An early reference to a ball game that was probably football comes from 1280 at Ulgham, Northumberland, England: "Henry... while playing at ball.. ran against David". Football was played in Ireland in 1308, with a documented reference to John McCrocan, a spectator at a "football game" at Newcastle, County Down, being charged with accidentally stabbing a player named William Bernard. Another reference to a football game comes in 1321 at Shouldham, Norfolk, England: "during the game at ball as he kicked the ball, a lay friend of his... ran against him and wounded himself".

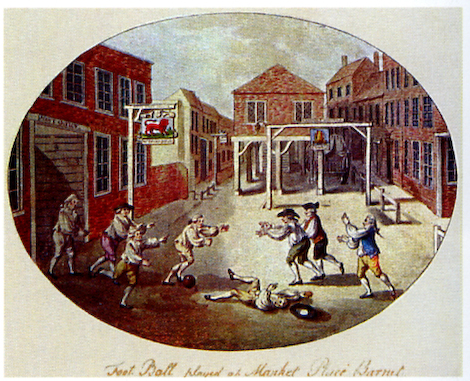
A French card circa 1750, depicting "Foot Ball"

Although the popularly believed etymology of the word football, or "foot ball", originated in reference to the action of a foot kicking a ball, this may be a false etymology. An alternative explanation has it that the word originally referred to a variety of games in medieval Europe, which were played on foot. These sports were usually played by peasants, as opposed to the horse-riding sports more often enjoyed by aristocrats. In some cases, the word has been applied to games which involved carrying a ball and specifically banned kicking. For example, the English writer William Hone, writing in 1825 or 1826, quotes the social commentator Sir Frederick Eden, 2nd Baronet, regarding a game – which Hone refers to as "Foot-Ball" – played in the parish of Scone, Perthshire:

The game was this: he who at any time got the ball into his hands, run [sic] with it till overtaken by one of the opposite part; and then, if he could shake himself loose from those on the opposite side who seized him, he run on; if not, he threw the ball from him, unless it was wrested from him by the other party, but no person was allowed to kick it. [Emphasis added.]

Conversely, in 1363, King Edward III of England issued a proclamation banning "...handball, football, or hockey; coursing and cock-fighting, or other such idle games", suggesting that "football" may have been differentiated from games that involved other parts of the body, although the medieval English game 'handball' was a predecessor to tennis called in French jeu de paume.

The Oxford English Dictionary (OED) traces the written use of the word football (as foteballe), referring to the game, to 1409. The first recorded use of the word to refer to the ball was in 1486, and the first use as a verb in 1599.

The word "soccer" originated as an Oxford "-er" slang abbreviation of "association", and is credited to late nineteenth century English footballer, Charles Wreford-Brown. It has been speculated that both this story and the William Webb Ellis rugby story are apocryphal; however, this appears to be a revision of history as the English term "soccer" fell out of favour while England differentiated their language from America's (where the term soccer had become widely used) English in the 20th century due to growing American popularity. "Socker" with a k appeared in print at least as early as 1889. The New York Times, published in 1905: "It was a fad at Oxford and Cambridge to use 'er' at the end of many words, such as foot-er, sport-er, and as Association did not take an 'er' easily, it was, and is, sometimes spoken of as Soccer." There is also the sometimes-heard variation, "soccer football".

A football code is a distinct, written set of laws or regulations that standardise play, scoring, team sizes, and match mechanics to facilitate play between and by an agreed concourse of football clubs, and which may subsequently serve as a model set of rules for other clubs and groups.

== National usage ==
=== Australia ===
Within Australia the term "football" is ambiguous and can mean up to four different codes of football in Australian English, depending on the context, geographical location and cultural factors; this includes soccer, Australian rules football, rugby league and rugby union. In the states of Victoria, Western Australia, South Australia and Tasmania the slang term footy is also used in an unofficial context, while in these states the two rugby football codes are collectively called rugby. The reverse applies in New South Wales, Queensland and ACT, where rugby league dominates and football can refer to this code. The oldest existing clubs in the three non-soccer codes are all called FC (Football Club), including Melbourne FC (AFL), Sydney University FC (Shute Shield) and South Sydney DRLFC (NRL). Australia-wide, soccer is commonly used to describe association football, with this usage going back more than a century, with football gaining traction amongst soccer followers since Soccer Australia was renamed Football Federation Australia in 2005. The men’s national team are still known by their nickname the Socceroos.

=== Canada ===
In Canada, football refers to Canadian football or American football, often differentiated as either "CFL" (from the Canadian Football League) or "NFL" (from the US National Football League). Because of the similarity between the games, many people in both countries do not consider the two styles of gridiron football separate sports per se, but rather different codes of the same sport which has a shared origin in the Harvard vs McGill game played in 1874 credited with the creation of this sport. If a Canadian were to say, "My brother plays football in the States", it would be clear from context that American football is meant. Canadian French usage parallels English usage, with le football usually referring to Canadian or American football, and le soccer referring to association football. When there is ambiguity, le football canadien or le football américain is used.

Rugby union football in Canada is almost always referred to simply as "rugby".

=== Caribbean ===
In most of the English-speaking Caribbean, "football" and "soccer" are both used to refer to association football, but use of the word "football" is far more common. The exception is the Bahamas, where the term "football" is used exclusively (while not actually in the Caribbean, usage in Bermuda follows that of the Bahamas). The nickname of the Trinidad and Tobago team, "The Soca Warriors", refers to a style of music, not the word soccer.

=== Ireland ===
In Ireland, "football" can mean association football, Gaelic football, or rugby union.

=== New Zealand ===
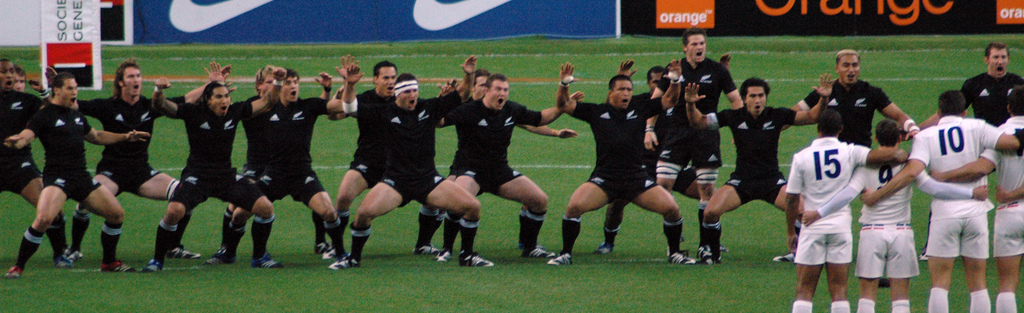
A haka performed before a match by the All Blacks

New Zealand Football is the governing body for association football in the country. The term can also be used to refer to rugby league or union, better-known as simply rugby. The slang term footy generally only means either of the two codes of rugby football, while rugby league is traditionally known as rugby league or just league. Usage of the term soccer has gone through a period of transition in recent times as the federation changed its name to New Zealand Football from New Zealand Soccer and the nickname of its women's team to Football Ferns from SWANZ.

=== South Africa ===
In South Africa, the word football generally refers to association football. However, association football is commonly known as soccer despite this. The domestic first division is the Premier Soccer League and both in conversation and the media (see e.g. The Sowetan or Independent Online), the term "soccer" is used. The stadium used for the final of the 2010 FIFA World Cup was known as Soccer City. Despite this, the country's national association is called the South African Football Association and "football" is mostly used in official contexts.

Rugby union is another popular football code in South Africa, but it is commonly known as just rugby as rugby league has a smaller presence in the country.

=== United Kingdom ===
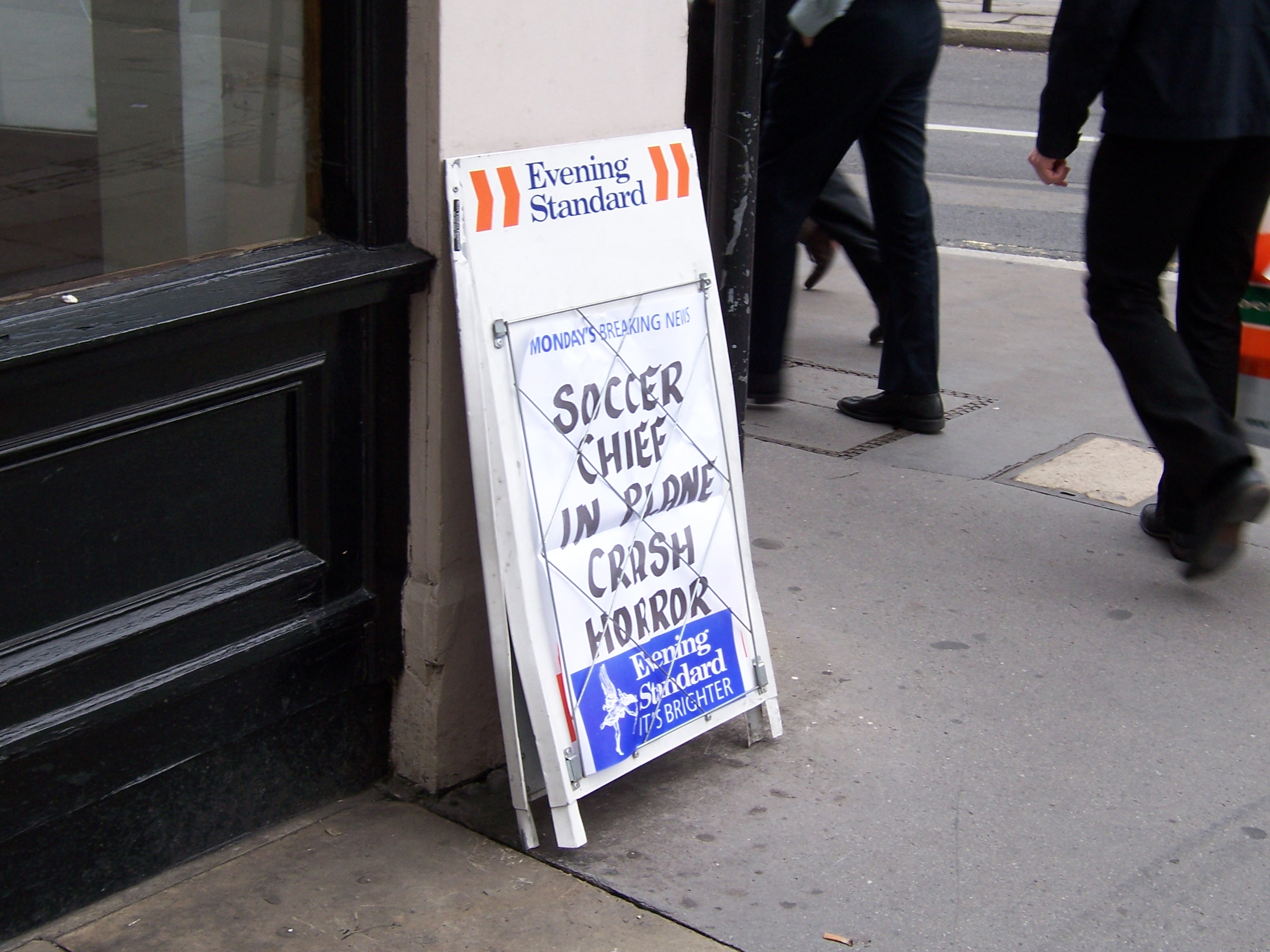
An example of the word soccer used in London in August 2006

The general use of football in the United Kingdom tends to refer to the most popular code of football in the country, which in the cases of England and Scotland is association football. However, the term soccer is understood by most as an alternative name for association football. The word soccer was a recognised way of referring to association football in the UK until around the 1970s, when it began to be perceived incorrectly as an Americanism.

For fans who are more interested in other codes of football, within their sporting community, the use of the word football may refer to their own code. However, even within such sporting communities an unqualified mention of football would usually be a reference to association football. In its heartlands, rugby league is referred to as either football or just league.

Fans of Gaelic football in Northern Ireland may use football for the sport (see above). Outside the nationalist community in Northern Ireland, Gaelic football is usually known by its full name.

American football is usually known by that name or gridiron, a name made familiar to a wider British audience by Channel 4, when it showed American football on Sunday evenings in the period 1982–1992.

=== United States ===
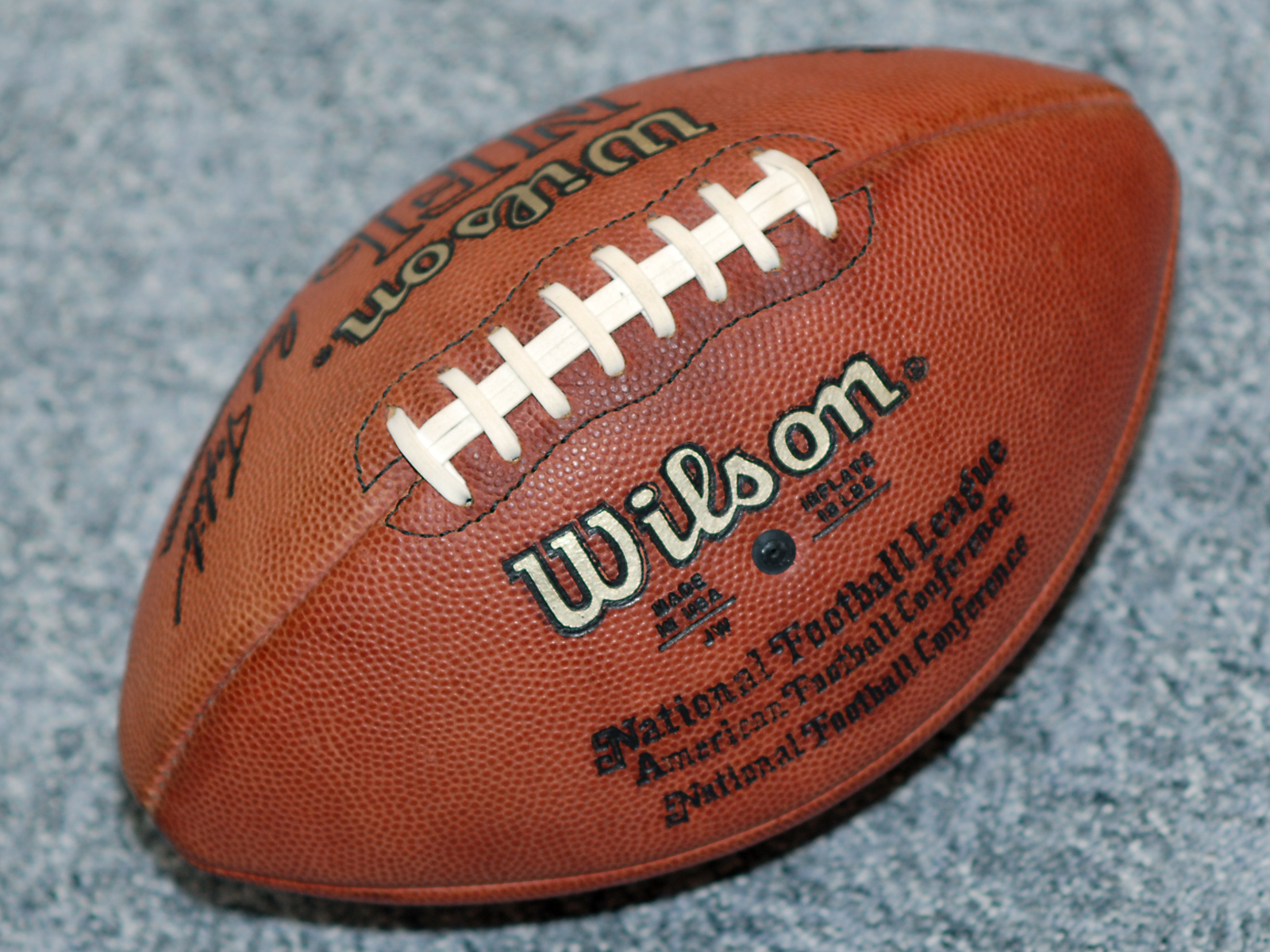
An American football

In the United States, the word football almost exclusively refers to the sport of American football. This is due to the history of American football originating from versions of rugby football and association football. As in Canada, football is used inclusively of Canadian football with American and Canadian football generally seen as two variants of the same sport. The term "gridiron football" is sometimes used to refer to both games together.

The sport of association football is commonly called "soccer" in the United States. The word "soccer" derives from "association" – as in The Football Association – in contrast to "rugger", or rugby football. It is English in origin, and caught on in the United States to distinguish the game from the locally better known American football; it also became predominant in other countries where another sport is known as football, such as Australia with Australian rules football. The term was in use in Britain throughout the early 20th century and became especially prominent in the decades after World War II, but by the 1980s British fans had begun avoiding the term, largely because it was erroneously seen as an Americanism. Conversely, by the early 2000s American soccer clubs from grassroots youth leagues to professional franchises began regularly incorporating the abbreviation "F.C." for "football club" in team or club names in homage to British practice, the only widespread use of the term "football" for the sport in the U.S.; the abbreviation "S.C." for "soccer club" is also used but less common.

Both rugby union and rugby league are generally known as rugby. Union is the more commonly played variant in the United States. Rugby league, Gaelic football, and Aussie rules have very small, albeit growing, numbers of adherents.

== "Football" as a loanword ==
Many languages use phonetic approximations of the English word "football" for association football. Examples include:

- Albanian: futboll
- Bengali: ফুটবল (Futbol)
- Filipino: futbol
- Hungarian : futball
- Lithuanian: futbolas
- Persian: فوتبال fuwtbal
- Russian: футбол futbol
- Romanian: fotbal
- Spanish: fútbol or futbol
- Thai: ฟุตบอล (fút-bon)
- Turkish: futbol

This commonality is reflected in the auxiliary languages Esperanto and Interlingua, which utilise futbalo and football, respectively.

These loanwords bear little or no resemblance to the native words for "foot" and "ball". By contrast, some languages have calques of "football": their speakers use equivalent terms that combine their words for "foot" and "ball". An example is the Greek ποδόσφαιρο (podósfero), the Chinese 足球 (zú qíu), or the Estonian jalgpall.

In German, "Football" is a loanword for American football, while the German word Fußball, a calque of "football" (Fuß = "foot", Ball = "ball"), means association football. The same goes for Dutch voetbal (voet = "foot", bal = "ball"), Swedish fotboll (fot = "foot", boll = "ball"), and so on – the words for "foot" and "ball" are very similar in all the Germanic languages. Only two Germanic languages do not use "football" or a calque thereof as their primary word for association football:

- Afrikaans — sokker. This echoes the predominant use of "soccer" in South African English.
- Icelandic — knattspyrna (knatt- = ball- and spyrna = kicking) is one of the two most common terms; this reflects a tendency to create indigenous words for foreign concepts. However, the calque fótbolti is at least equally common.

The Celtic languages also generally refer to association football with calques of "football" — an example is the Welsh pêl-droed. However, Irish, which like Afrikaans is native to a country where "soccer" is the most common English term for the sport, uses sacar.

== See also ==
- Names for association football
- Names of Australian rules football
- Nuclear football
- Political football
