= Gridiron football =

Team sports primarily played in North America

Diagram of an American football field. Numbers on the field indicate the yards to the nearest end zone.

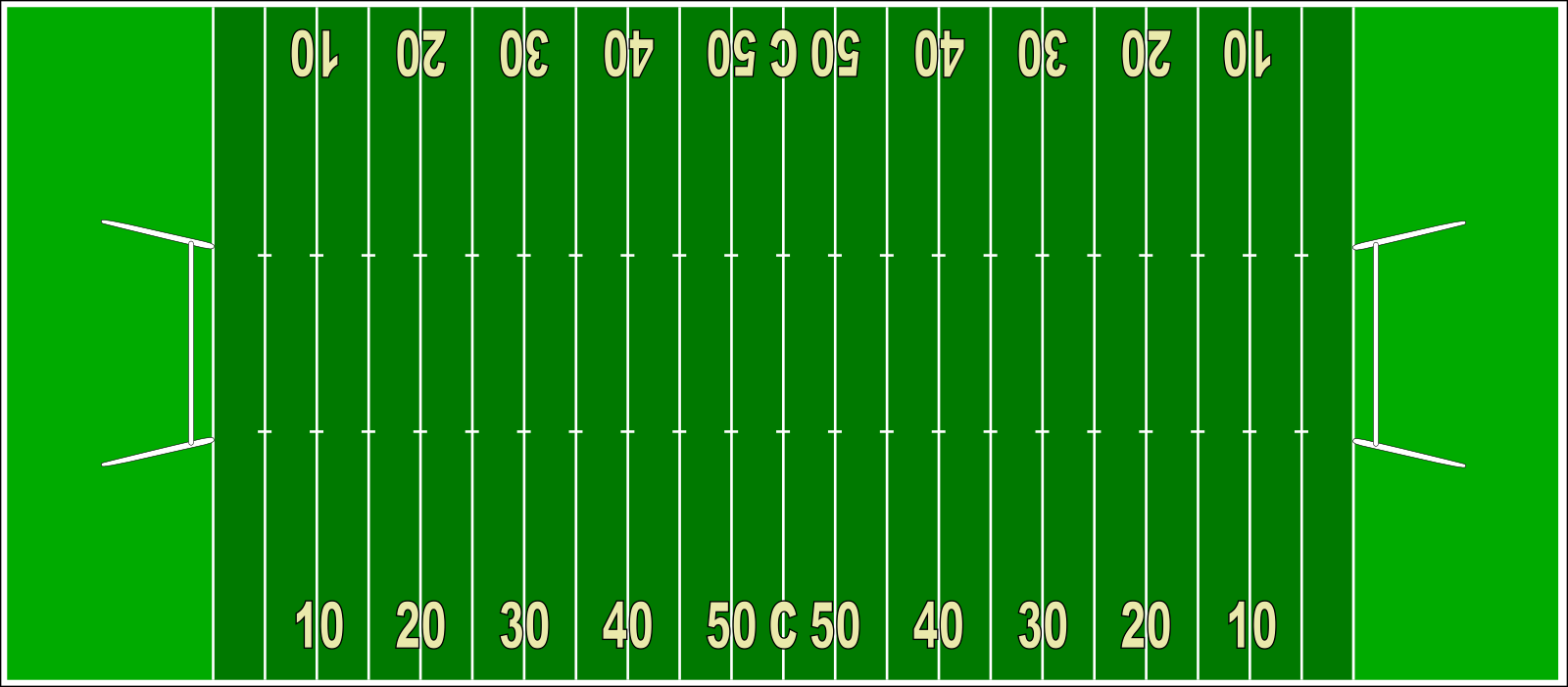
Diagram of a Canadian football field, which is wider and longer than the American football field.

Gridiron football (/ˈɡrɪd.aɪ.ərn/ GRID-eye-ərn) (Note: also known as North American football, or in North America as simply football) is a family of team sports derived from rugby football (and football, by extension) primarily played in the United States and Canada.

American football, which uses 11 players, is the version played in the United States and the best known form of gridiron football worldwide, while Canadian football, which uses 12 players, predominates in Canada. Other derivative versions include arena football, flag football, and amateur games such as touch and street football. Football is played at professional, collegiate, high school, semi-professional, and amateur levels.

These sports originated in the 19th century from older games related to modern association football and rugby football, more specifically rugby union. American football and Canadian football developed early, alongside but independently of each other; the root of the game known as "football" originated from an 1874 game between Harvard and McGill Universities, following which the American college adopted the Canadian school's more rugby-like rules. The first recorded game was played at University College of the University of Toronto.

Over time, Canadian teams adopted features of the American variant of the game and vice versa. Both varieties are distinguished from other football sports by their use of hard plastic helmets and shoulder pads, the forward pass, the system of downs, a number of unique rules and positions, measurement in customary units of yards (even in Canada, which largely metricated in the 1970s), and a distinctive brown leather ball in the shape of a prolate spheroid with pointed ends.

The international governing body for the sport is the International Federation of American Football (IFAF); although the organization plays all of its international competitions under American rules, it uses a definition of the game that is broad enough that it includes Canadian football under its umbrella. Football Canada, the governing body for Canadian football, is an IFAF member.

== Etymology ==
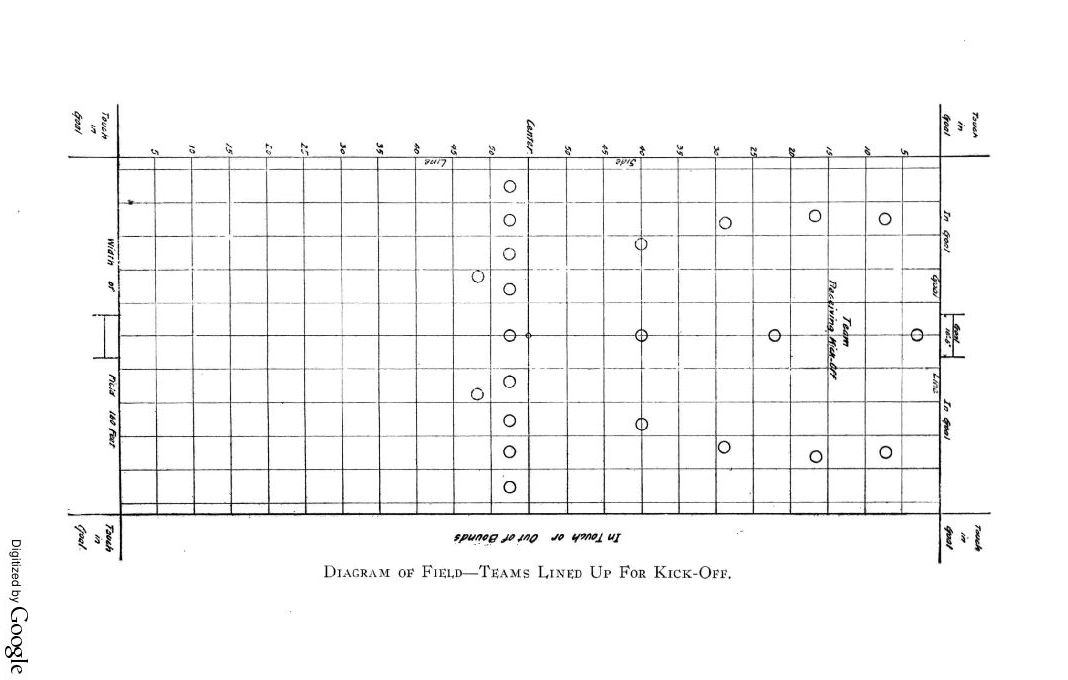
A 1904 diagram of an American football field. In this period, lines were painted along the length of the field as well as the width, making a grid pattern.

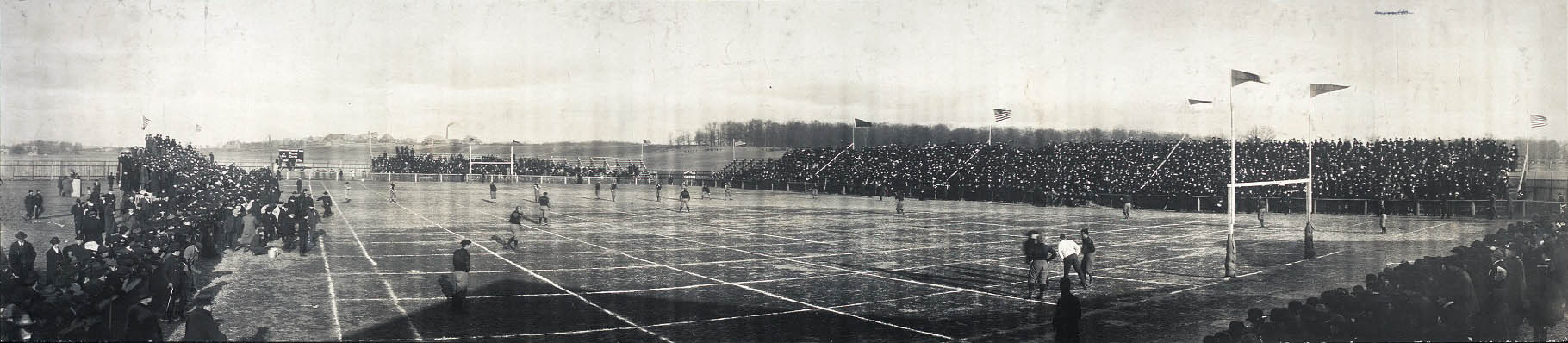
1906 field with grid pattern

The sport is typically known as simply "football" in the countries where it originated, regardless of the specific variety. In Europe, the sport is commonly known as "American football" as "football" usually refers to association football ("soccer"). Various sources use the term "North American football" when discussing the American and Canadian games together, but this term is quite rare. The International Federation of American Football (IFAF), uses "American football" inclusive of Canadian football and other varieties.

The two sports are also sometimes known as "gridiron football". The name originated with the sport's once-characteristic playing field: the original American football and Canadian football fields were marked by a series of parallel lines along both the width and length of the field, which produced a grid pattern resembling a cross-hatched cooking gridiron. The ball would be snapped in the grid in which it was downed on the previous play. By 1920, the grid system was abandoned in favor of the system of yard lines and hash marks used today. In Australia, American football is often referred to as "gridiron" or (in more formal contexts) "American football", as "football" usually refers to Australian rules football or rugby league similar to how association football is usually called "soccer" in Australian English. The governing body for American football in Australia is Gridiron Australia.

== History ==
The sport developed from informal games played in North America during the 19th century. Early games had a variety of local rules and were generally similar to modern rugby union and soccer. The earliest recorded instance of gridiron football occurred at University College on the University of Toronto's St. George campus in November 1861.

Later in the 1860s, teams from universities were playing each other, leading to more standardized rules and the creation of college football. While several American schools adopted rules based on the soccer rules of the English Football Association, Harvard University held to its traditional "carrying game". Meanwhile, McGill University in Montreal used rules based on rugby union. In 1874, Harvard and McGill organized two games using each other's rules. Harvard took a liking to McGill's rugby-style rules and adopted them. In turn, they were used when Harvard and Yale University played their first intercollegiate sports game in 1875, after which the rugby-style Canadian game was adopted by Yale players and spectators from Yale and Princeton University. This version of the game was subsequently played with several other U.S. colleges over the next several years.

American football teams and organizations subsequently adopted new rules that distinguished the game from rugby. Many of these early innovations were the work of Walter Camp, including the sport's line of scrimmage and the system of downs. Another consequential change was the adoption of the forward pass in 1906, which allowed the quarterback to throw the ball forward over the line of scrimmage to a receiver. Canadian football remained akin to rugby for decades, though a progressive faction of players, chiefly based in the western provinces, demanded changes to the game based on the innovations in American football. Over the years, the sport adopted more Americanized rules, though it retained some of its historical features, including a 110-yard (100 m) field, 12-player teams, and three downs instead of four. Around the same time Camp devised the rules for American football, the Canadian game would develop in the same way (but separately) from the American game; the Burnside rules were instrumental in establishing many of the rules for the modern game.

== Versions ==
- American football is the most common and widely known of these sports. It was originally more closely related to rugby, until various rule changes created by Camp were implemented in 1880, such as the system of downs, and the two sports diverged irreversibly after the forward pass was introduced to the American game in 1906. It is played with eleven players to a side, four downs and a 100-yard (91 m) field. The major professional league, the National Football League (NFL), has its own rule book. College football programs generally play under the code defined in the NCAA Football Rules and Interpretations; within the college football structure is sprint football, a variant of the game played solely by players who weigh less than the average college student at a small number of northeastern and midwestern universities in the United States. High schools generally follow the rules and interpretations published by the National Federation of State High School Associations (NFHS), although some states follow the NCAA code for high school play. Youth games (below high school age) generally follow NFHS code with modifications. Adult semi-pro, alternative and minor professional, amateur, touch, flag, etc. may follow any one of these codes or use their own rules. While the vast majority of the game is the same among these three codes, subtle variations in rules can lead to large differences in play. Many of the differences are in penalty enforcement and the definitions of fouls.

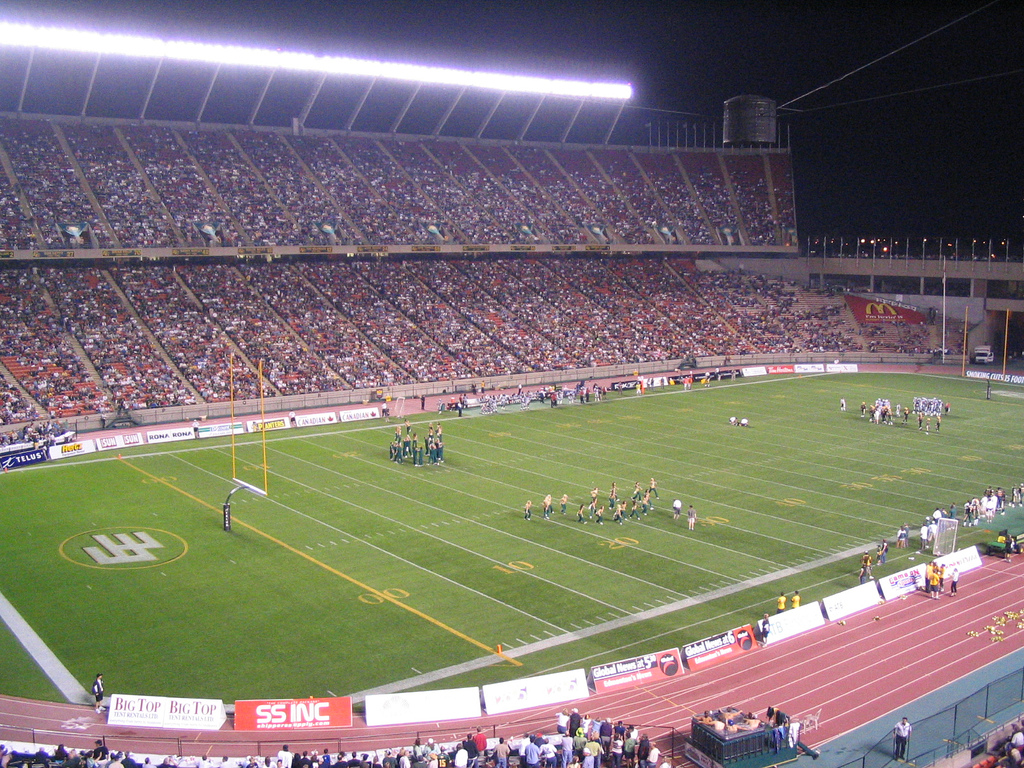
Commonwealth Stadium in Edmonton, with a Canadian Football League game in progress

- Canadian football is played almost exclusively in Canada. Like its American cousin, it was originally more closely related to rugby, until the Burnside rules were adopted in 1903 (as such, despite their similarities, the modern American and Canadian forms of football were developed separately from each other); the forward pass was adopted in Canada in 1929. The game is played on a 110-yard (100 m) field, has three downs, and twelve players to a side. The Canadian game also features a one-point "single" (formally called a "rouge") for a ball kicked into or through the end zone and not returned by the receiving team. Like the American game, the Canadian Football League and U Sports both have their own rulebooks, although there are generally fewer differences than between their American counterparts.
- Nine-man football, eight-man football and six-man football are varieties of gridiron football played with fewer players. They are played with the same number of downs (often with a 15-yard [14 m] requirement for a new set of downs, as opposed to 10 in other codes), fewer offensive linemen, and an 80-yard (73 m) field. These games are generally based on the high school rulebooks, which have an addendum devoted to the play of these codes, and are generally played by teams from high schools with very small student bodies, usually in rural areas of the United States. Similar small-roster versions of Canadian football are played in rural Canada. Seven-man football formats have seen occasional adaptations, including the semi-professional American 7s Football League and the preparatory-age OT7.
- Indoor football is played with special rules to accommodate smaller indoor facilities, usually sharing arenas with basketball or ice hockey teams. It is played on a 50-yard (46 m) field with, usually, eight or seven players to a side. Prototype games were played in 1902 and 1932, both of which used the shortened field but followed the outdoor standard 11 to a side. However, indoor football did not gain popularity until James F. Foster's proprietary version, arena football, debuted in 1986, and set most of the standards for indoor leagues today. As almost all indoor leagues are for-profit professional leagues, each league has its own proprietary code.
- Flag football is a limited-contact variant of American football where, instead of tackling players to the ground, the defensive team must remove a flag or flag belt from the ball carrier ("deflagging") to end a down, and contact is limited between players. The specific rules of flag football vary widely by league, though all share in common their replication of the rules of traditional American football with tackling replaced by flag-pulling. Flag football will be an Olympic sport at the 2028 Summer Olympics for both men and women.
- Touch football and backyard football are informal varieties of the game, played primarily at an amateur and recreational level. No specific rulebooks are universally recognized for these variants, where house rules usually apply.
- Wheelchair football is an adapted version of touch football for those with mobility-related disabilities. Rules vary based on organization but generally use a reduced number of players (six or seven) on a reduced size field (ranging from a basketball court to a 60-yard long field).
- Women's American football is the organized play of the sport by women. Most organized leagues play by rules identical to male-dominated leagues. The former Lingerie Football League earned notoriety for its indoor, seven-on-seven variety of women's football with minimal protective equipment and uniforms resembling women's underwear; the Lingerie Football League was later reorganized and renamed Extreme Football League. Informal and amateur varieties of female-only games such as powderpuff, also exist. Given the popularity of gridiron football in North America yet the rarity of female-only teams at the high school level and above, female players have also played on men's teams on rare occasions. College flag football has started to receive varsity status from colleges and universities in North America as a women's sport in the mid-2020's.

== Leagues ==
=== Professional leagues ===
League	Country	Sport	Founded	Teams	Revenue US$ (bn)	Average attendance (2023)	Average salary US$
National Football League	United States	American football	1920	32	14.0	69,528	2,700,000
Canadian Football League	Canada	Canadian football	1958	9	0.2	22,505	89,000
United Football League	United States	American football	2024	8	0.1 (est.)	13,505	50,000
Indoor Football League	United States	Indoor football	2008	18			3,500
National Arena League	United States	Indoor football	2016	10			2,450
The Arena League	United States	Indoor football	2024	8			
Arena Football One	United States	Indoor football	2025	8			
Liga de Fútbol Americano Profesional	Mexico	American football	2016	8		2,000	600
X-League (X1/X2/X3)	Japan	American football	1971	18/18/17			55,000
European League of Football	Europe	American football	2021	17		3,914	6,300
German Football League	Germany	American football	1979	16			

The best NFL players are among the highest paid athletes in the world.

=== Collegiate leagues ===
League	Country	Sport	Year founded	Divisions	Teams	Promotion/relegation	Average attendance
NCAA	United States	American football	1906	4 (Note: While the NCAA is formally split into three divisions, the top tier, Division I, is itself split for football only into the Football Bowl Subdivision and the Football Championship Subdivision.)	664	No	27,142 (Div. I)
NCAA	United States	Flag football	2024	1	12	No	
NAIA	United States	American football	1940	1	97	No	
NAIA	United States	Flag football	2021	1	24	No	
NJCAA	United States	American football	1938	2	50	No	
NJCAA	United States	Flag football	2023	1	7	No	
CCCAA	United States	American football	1929	1	67	No	
U Sports	Canada	Canadian football	1961	1	27	No	3,370
U Sports	Canada	Flag football	2027	1	TBA	No	
ONEFA	Mexico	American football	1978	1	22	No	
CONADEIP	Mexico	American football	2010	1	12	No	
JAFA	Japan	American football	1934	1–5	220	Yes	
KAFA	South Korea	American football	1945	1	39	No	
BUAFL	United Kingdom	American football	2007	3	83	Yes	
CSFL	United States	Sprint football	1940	1	9	No	
MSFL	United States	Sprint football	2022	1	7	No	
NCFA	United States	American football	1940	1	27	No	

== Comparison of codes ==
Code	Traditional season	Field length	End zones	Field width	Player count	Line of scrimmage	Downs	Line to gain	Forward motion before snap	Goal posts
American	Fall; Winter	100	10	53 1/3	11	7	4	10	No	At back of end zones 18 1/2 (NFL and college) to 23 1/3 (high school) ft. wide
Canadian	Summer; Fall	110	20	65	12	7	3	10	Yes	On goal lines 18 1/2 ft. wide
Indoor	Spring	50	8	28 1/3	8	4	4	10	Yes	At back of end zones, 9 to 10 ft. wide Rebound nets on sides optional
Flag		50	10	25	5		4	10		None
6-man	Fall	80	10	40	6	3	4	15	No	At back of end zones 23 1/3 wide

== Gameplay ==
The football used in North American football has a distinct pointed shape, with a brown color and prominent laces to aid in throwing

This is a minimal description of the game in general, with elements common to all or almost all variants of the game. For more specific rules, see each code's individual articles.

Prior to the start of a game, a coin toss determines which team will decide if they want to kick off the ball to their opponent, or receive the ball from their opponent. Each team lines up on opposite halves of the field, with a minimum ten yards of space between them for the kickoff. The team receiving the ball can make a fair catch (which stops the play immediately), catch the ball and run it back until the ball carrier is tackled, or, if the ball is kicked out of bounds, let the ball go dead on its own (the last case usually happens when the ball is kicked all the way into or through the opponent's end zone, resulting in a touchback and the ball being brought several yards out of the end zone to begin play). A kicking team can, under special circumstances, attempt to recover its own kick, but the rules of the game make it very difficult to do so reliably, and so this tactic is usually only used as a surprise or desperation maneuver.

At this point, play from scrimmage begins. The team in possession of the ball is on offense and the opponent is on defense. The offense is given a set amount of time (up to forty seconds, depending on the governing body), during which the teams can set up a play in a huddle and freely substitute players to set into a formation, in which the offense must remain perfectly still for at least one second (the formation requirement does not apply to Canadian football). At least half of the players (seven in standard American and Canadian football, four in standard indoor ball) on the offense must line up on the line of scrimmage in this formation, including the snapper, who handles the ball before play commences; the rest can (and almost always do) line up behind the line. Neither the offense nor the defense can cross the line of scrimmage before the play commences. Once the formation is set, the snapper snaps the ball to one of the players behind him. (A snapper must snap the ball within 20 to 25 seconds of the official setting the ball back into position after the previous play, and a play clock is kept to enforce the measure.) Once the ball is snapped, the play has commenced, and the offense's goal is to continue advancing the ball toward their opponent's end zone. This can be done either by running with the ball or by a rule unique to football known as the forward pass. In a forward pass, a player from behind the line of scrimmage throws the ball to an eligible receiver (another back or one player on each end of the line), who must catch the ball before it touches the ground. The play stops when a player with the ball touches any part of their body other than hand or foot to the ground, runs out of the boundaries of the field, is obstructed from making further forward progress, or a forward pass hits the ground without being caught (in the last case, the ball returns to the spot it was snapped). To stop play, players on defense are allowed to tackle the ball carrier at any time the ball is in play, provided they do not grab the face mask of the helmet or make helmet-to-helmet contact when doing so. At any time, the player with the ball can attempt a backward, or lateral, pass to any other player in order to keep the ball in play; this is generally rare. Any player on defense can, at any time, attempt to intercept a forward pass in flight, at which point the team gains possession; they can also gain possession by recovering a fumble or stripping the ball away from the ball carrier (a "forced fumble"). A typical play can last between five and twenty seconds.

If any illegal action happens during the play, then the results of the previous play are erased and a penalty is assessed, forcing the offending team to surrender between five and fifteen yards of field to the opponent. Whether this yardage is measured from the original spot of the ball before the play, the spot of the illegal action, or the end of the play depends on the individual foul. The most common penalties include false start (when an offensive player jumps to begin the play before the ball is snapped, a five-yard penalty), holding (the grabbing of a player other than the ball carrier to obstruct their progress; a ten-yard penalty against offensive players and a five-yard penalty against defensive ones), and pass interference (when either a receiver or the defending player pushes or blocks the other to prevent them from catching the pass). A team on offense cannot score points as the direct result of a penalty; a defensive foul committed in the team's own end zone, if the penalty is assessed from the spot of the foul, places the ball at the one-yard line. In contrast, a defensive team can score points as a direct result of a penalty; if the offense commits a foul under the same scenario, the defensive team receives two points and a free kick. In all other circumstances (except for the open-ended and extremely rare unfair act clause), a penalty cannot exceed more than half the distance to the end zone. If the penalty would be less advantageous than the result of the actual play, then the team not committing the penalty can decline it.

In order to keep play moving, the offense must make a certain amount of progress (10 yards in most leagues) within a certain number of plays (3 in Canada, 4 in the United States), called downs. If the offense does indeed make this progress, a first down is achieved, and the team gets another set of plays (3 or 4, depending) to achieve another 10 yards. If not, the offense loses possession to their opponent at the spot where the ball is. More commonly, however, the team on offense will, if they have a minimal chance of gaining a first down and have only one play left to do it (fourth down in the U.S., third down in Canada), attempt a scrimmage kick. There are two types of scrimmage kick: a punt is when the ball is released from the punter's hand and kicked downfield as close to the opponent's end zone as possible without entering it; the kicking team loses possession of the ball after the kick and the receiving team can attempt to advance the ball or call a fair catch. The other scrimmage kick is a field goal attempt. This must be attempted by place kick or (more rarely) drop kick, and if the kicked ball passes through the goal set at the edge of the opponent's end zone, the team scores three points. (Four-point field goals have been offered in a few variations of the game under special rules, but the NFL, college and high school football only offer three-point field goals.) In Canada, any kick that goes into the end zone and is not returned, whether it be a punt or a missed field goal, is awarded one single point.

If the team in possession of the ball, at any time, advances (either by carrying or catching) the ball into the opponent's end zone, it is a touchdown, and the team scores six points and a free play known as a try. In a try, a team attempts to score one or two points (rules vary by each league, but under standard rules, a field goal on a try is worth one point while another touchdown is worth two). At the college and professional levels, the defense can also score on a try, but only on the same scale (thus a botched try the defense returns for a touchdown scores only two points and not six). Kickoffs occur after every touchdown and field goal.

If a team is in its own end zone and commits a foul, is tackled with the ball, or bats, fumbles, kicks or throws the ball backward out of the field of play through the same end zone, the defense scores a safety, worth two points.

After a try, safety or field goal, the team that had possession of the ball goes back to the middle of the field and kicks the ball off to their opponent, and play continues as it did in the beginning of the game.

Play continues until the end of a quarter, whereupon each team switches their end of the field and play begins again at the equivalent yard line from where play had finished at the other end. After another quarter of play comes halftime.

After the halftime break, a new kickoff occurs and another two quarters are played. Whichever team has more points at the end of the game is declared the winner; in the event of a tie, each league has its own rules for overtime to break the tie. Because of the nature of the game, pure sudden-death overtimes have been abolished at all levels of the game as of 2012. Ties are allowed in some versions of the game.

At all adult levels of the game, a game is 60 timed minutes in length, split into four 15-minute quarters. High school football uses 12-minute quarters, and the general rule is that the younger the players, the shorter the quarters typically are. Because of the halftime, quarter breaks, time-outs, minute warnings (two minutes before the end of a half in the NFL, three minutes in Canadian football), and frequent stoppages of the game clock (the clock stops, for example, after every incomplete pass and any time a ball goes out of bounds), the actual time it takes for a football game to be completed is typically over three hours in the NFL, and slightly under three hours in the CFL.

== Injuries ==
According to a 2017 study on brains of deceased gridiron football players, 99% of tested brains of NFL players, 88% of CFL players, 64% of semi-professional players, 91% of college football players, and 21% of high school football players had various stages of chronic traumatic encephalopathy (CTE).

Other common injuries include injuries of legs, arms and lower back.

== See also ==
- American football in the United States
- Comparison of American and Canadian football
- Concussions in American football
- Football (word)
- Glossary of American football
- Glossary of Canadian football
- Health issues in American football
