= List of Collegiate Sprint Football League champions =

This is a list of Collegiate Sprint Football League champions. Founded in 1934, the league was originally known as "The Eastern 150-pound Football League" (150s). In 1967, the name of the league was changed to "The Eastern Lightweight Football League" (ELFL), and then again into its current form, "The Collegiate Sprint Football League" (CSFL), in 1998.

Before 2022, the CSFL was the sole governing body for college-level sprint football. It was joined in the 2022 season by the Midwest Sprint Football League, initially featuring six schools in the Midwest and Upper South.

== League champions ==
- Sprint football champions
- Active Teams: Alderson Broaddus, Army, Caldwell, Chestnut Hill, Cornell, Mansfield, Navy, Penn, St. Thomas Aquinas
- Inactive Teams: Villanova, Yale, Rutgers, Michigan, Lafayette, Columbia, Hamilton, Harvard, Princeton, Franklin Pierce, Post
- Originated: 1934
- Current Champion: Navy
Navy (41); 1946 1947 1948 1950 1951 1952 1953 1955 1956 1959 1961 1963 1965 1967 1969 1971 1977 1979 1981 1984 1985 1986 1987 1992 1995 1996 1997 2001 2002 2004 2005 2007 2008 2009 2011 2014 2018 2021 2022 2023 2025	Army (37); 1957 1958; 1960 1962; 1964 1966 1968 1970 1971 1972 1973 1974 1976 1979 1980 1981 1983 1984 1986 1987 1988 1989 1990 1991 1993 1994 1996 1998 1999 2003 2010 2012 2013 2015 2017 2019 2024	Princeton (10); 1937 1938 1939 1941 1942 1954 1989 1975 1991 1993	Cornell (6); 1975 1978 1982 1984 1986 2006	Caldwell (1); 2020
Rutgers (2); 1934 1935	Penn (6); 1940 1996 1998 2000 2010 2016	Villanova (1); 1949	Yale (3); 1936 1937 1940
- Shared Championships (15); 1937 1940 1971 1975 1979 1981 1984; 1986 1987 1989 1991 1993 1996 1998 2010 2020

Source 1946-2020:

Collegiate Sprint Football League (1998–present)
2025: Navy
2024: Army
2023: Navy
2022: Navy
2021: Navy
2020: Army/Caldwell (default/de facto)
2019: Army
2018: Navy
2017: Army
2016: Penn
2015: Army
2014: Navy
2013: Army
2012: Army
2011: Navy
2010: Penn/Army
2009: Navy
2008: Navy
2007: Navy
2006: Cornell
2005: Navy
2004: Navy
2003: Army
2002: Navy
2001: Navy
2000: Penn
1999: Army
1998: Army/Penn

The Eastern Lightweight Football League (1967–1997)
1997: Navy
1996: Army/Navy/Penn
1995: Navy
1994: Army
1993: Army/Princeton
1992: Navy
1991: Army/Princeton
1990: Army
1989: Army/Princeton
1988: Army
1987: Army/Navy
1986: Army/Cornell/Navy
1985: Navy
1984: Army/Cornell/Navy
1983: Army
1982: Cornell
1981: Army/Navy
1980: Army
1979: Army/Navy
1978: Cornell
1977: Navy
1976: Army
1975: Cornell/Princeton
1974: Army
1973: Army
1972: Army
1971: Army/Navy
1970: Army
1969: Navy
1968: Army
1967: Navy

The Eastern 150-pound Football League (1934–1966)
1966: Army
1965: Navy
1964: Army
1963: Navy
1962: Army
1961: Navy
1960: Army
1959: Navy
1958: Army
1957: Army
1956: Navy
1955: Navy
1954: Princeton
1953: Navy
1952: Navy
1951: Navy
1950: Navy
1949: Villanova
1948: Navy
1947: Navy
1946: Navy
1943-1945 : No League Play
1942: Princeton
1941: Princeton
1940: Penn/Yale
1939: Princeton
1938: Princeton
1937: Princeton/Yale
1936: Yale
1935: Rutgers
1934: Rutgers

Midwest Sprint Football League (2022–present)
2026: Midway
2025: Saint Mary-of-the-Woods
2024: Calumet
2023: Calumet
2022: Saint Mary-of-the-Woods
