= Sprint football =

Form of American football with restricted player weights

2016 game between the United States Naval Academy sprint football team and Heroic Military Academy

Sprint football is a varsity sport played by United States colleges and universities, under standard American football rules. Participating institutions are members of either the Collegiate Sprint Football League (founded 1934) or the Midwest Sprint Football League (founded 2022).

In sprint football, players must weigh less than 183 lbs and have a minimum of 5% body fat to be eligible to play. The end result of these weight restrictions is an emphasis on speed and agility rather than on size and strength.

== Competition ==
– Collegiate Sprint Football League (CSFL)
– MSFL member transferring to CSFL member in 2027
– Departing MSFL member
– New York City CSFL area teams (see other map)
– Collegiate Sprint Football League
– Future CSFL member

As of the upcoming 2027 season, 13 schools will play in the CSFL while no teams remain in the Midwest Sprint Football League, leaving its future existence in doubt. Of the 13 CSFL members, ten are private universities (two being schools in the Ivy League) and two are national military academies. CSFL member Mansfield University of Pennsylvania is the only state university or college currently playing sprint football.

=== CSFL ===
CSFL Members
School	Joined/Joining
US Military Academy (Army)	1957
Caldwell University	2017
Chestnut Hill College	2015
Cornell University	1937
Mansfield University	2008
Molloy University	2024
US Naval Academy (Navy)	1946
University of Pennsylvania	1934
St. Thomas Aquinas College	2018
D'Youville University	2026
New York Institute of Technology	2027
Bellarmine University	2027
Quincy University	2027

All CSFL teams are located in the Northeastern and Mid-Atlantic regions of the United States, with the exception of Bellarmine and Quincy. Twelve schools joined in the 21st century, one in 2008, six in the 2010s, one in 2024, and one in 2026; three more are set to join in 2027. Nine are active in sprint football in the 2026 season. Of these new members, three no longer sponsor the sport; Franklin Pierce University, which joined in 2012, transitioned to full-sized football in NCAA Division II after the 2018 season, Post University, which joined in 2010, did the same after the canceled 2020 season, and Alderson Broaddus University, which joined in 2019 and also fielded a full-sized football team, dropped all athletics and departed the CSFL in 2023. Of the other 21st-century arrivals, no other current members also field a full-size varsity football team. The other four teams (all of which have been in the CSFL since 1957) have full-size football teams that compete in NCAA Division I, the service academies in FBS, and the Ivy League schools in FCS. Each team plays a seven-game season. It is not uncommon for the CSFL teams to play against full-size junior varsity or club football squads from other schools in the early part of the season (in 2015, for instance, Navy faced the Longwood Lancers).

Army, Cornell, and Penn (and formerly Princeton prior to it dropping the sport) hold alumni games in which sprint football alumni return to campus for a full-contact scrimmage against the varsity squad. The alumni games serve the dual purpose of raising funds to support the team and maintaining alumni interest in the program. Typically, the alumni have to donate a monetary weight penalty (e.g., $2 per pound) for weighing above the 178-pound limit. In 2017, when Caldwell joined, the CSFL was split into two divisions, the North and the South. On December 7, 2017, St. Thomas Aquinas College was announced as the tenth team in the league, to begin play in the 2018 season. After that season, Franklin Pierce left to play full-sized football and was replaced by Alderson Broaddus. However, in 2023, Alderson Broaddus' authorization to grant degrees was revoked, and they were required to drop all athletics, including their sprint football program.

For its first 83 seasons, the CSFL did not sponsor playoff or bowl games (a tradition due in no small part to the Ivy League schools, which before the 2025 FCS season abstained from all football postseason play to encourage academic performance. The season championship was decided solely by the regular season record; if multiple teams were tied atop the standings, all of them shared the championship. Since Navy's and Army's respective admissions to the league, those two schools have dominated the league; of the 72 seasons of lightweight football since Navy joined, they and/or Army have won at least a share of the league title in 76 of them, including stretches of 20 consecutive seasons from 1955–74 and 17 straight from 1983–99. Since the 2017 season, a championship game has been held, except in 2020 and 2025.

Although CSFL and MSFL teams are considered varsity teams and official school-sponsored sports for the purpose of the NCAA, sprint football teams do not fall into the same divisional structure as other NCAA sports and thus do not follow the same rules or restrictions on athletic scholarships as traditional college football squads are bound to follow.

In April 2020, the CSFL chose Dan Mara, also Commissioner of the Central Atlantic Collegiate Conference (CACC) as Commissioner. In July of that year, the league voted to not play a fall 2020 season out of concern over the COVID-19 pandemic, over the objections of Army and Navy, who indicated an intent to continue play without the other eight teams. In addition to a single Army-Navy game in the fall, Caldwell and St. Thomas Aquinas played a single game in spring 2021. The league resumed normal operations in fall 2021.

As of 2023, only one charter member of the league remained, the Penn Quakers. The Princeton Tigers dropped the sport after 2015, following 16 consecutive years of winless seasons (an organized football record) and changes in league membership, and shifted its resources to club football. A number of other Ivy League schools have historically had sprint football teams, including the Yale Bulldogs, Harvard Crimson, and Columbia Lions, all of whom had dropped the sport many years earlier; of the Ivy League schools, only Penn and the Cornell Big Red remain.

The two newest CSFL members are Molloy University, a Division II member which added the sport in the 2024 season, and D'Youville University, which joined in 2026. New York Institute of Technology, Bellarmine University, and Quincy University will join in 2027.

=== MSFL ===
MSFL Members
School	Joined
Bellarmine University	2022
Calumet College of St. Joseph	2022
Midway University	2022
Quincy Universty	2022

The MSFL was formed in 2021, with play starting in 2022, by six private institutions in the Midwest and Upper South. The league has its own bylaws and championship, but uses the same weight limits as the CSFL. The creation of the MSFL was touted as "the largest single-year expansion of the sport in nearly 90 years." Of the members, all are Catholic except for Midway University and Oakland City University. The only NCAA Division I member is Bellarmine University, which was transitioning from NCAA Division II when the MSFL was formed. Quincy University, a Division II member, is the only charter MSFL member that also plays full-sized football. Three other charter members are NAIA members. Fontbonne University is the only charter member that no longer plays the sport; the NCAA Division III member played in the first two MSFL seasons before announcing its closure at the end of the 2024–25 academic year.

The league added two members, both private institutions, after its first season. Oakland City University, an NAIA member that does not play full-sized football, announced on July 19, 2022 that it was adding sprint football for the 2023 season. In the process, it became the MSFL's second non-Catholic member, instead being affiliated with the General Baptist churches. Exactly three months later, Walsh University, a Catholic institution and NCAA Division II member that plays full-sized football, announced it would also add sprint football for 2023.

Following this expansion, however, the league has seen a number of departures:

- Fontbonne announced they would depart the league after the 2023 season; the school would later announce in May of 2024 that it would be closing after the summer semester in 2025.
- Walsh University announced it would discontinue its sprint football program in 2025.
- Saint Mary-of-the-Woods announced they would transition their sprint football team to full-sized play and begin competition in the NAIA starting in 2026.
- Both Calumet College of St. Joseph and Midway would announce later that they would both be following suit with Saint Mary-of-the-Woods, transitioning their respective sprint football teams to full-sized play and beginning competition in the NAIA starting in 2027.
- Oakland City announced it would be dropping all undergraduate programs for the 2026–27 academic year, effectively dropping athletics in the process.
- Both Quincy University and Bellarmine University will transition to CSFL play for the 2027 season.

These departures would take MSFL membership from a high of 8 members in 2023, to no members for the 2027 season and beyond, leaving the future of the league in doubt; the league would play the 2026 season with only four teams (Quincy, Bellarmine, Midway, and Calumet).

=== Weight limit ===
CSFL rules, also used by the MSFL, require that players must weigh no more than 178 pounds (81 kg), a figure that has slowly increased from its original 150 pounds (68 kg) as the weight of the American college student has increased over the course of the league's existence. League rules specify official weigh-ins four days and two days before each game. Players must weigh 178 pounds (81 kg) four days and 2 days prior to game day. Players are allowed to gain weight back after meeting the weight limit.

== Notable players ==
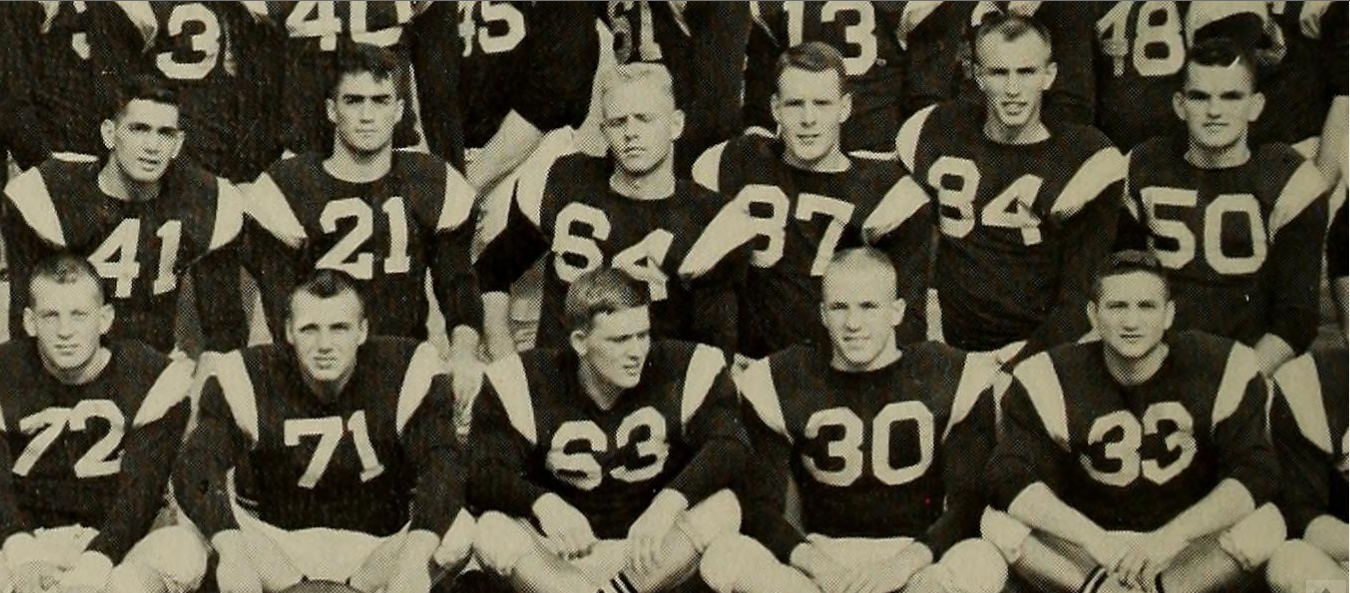
Navy sprint football team, Fall 1963.

- Hoodie Allen (Steven Markowitz), American rapper, played defensive back at Penn.
- Joseph Robinette "Beau" Biden III, US Army veteran (Bronze Star) former Attorney General of Delaware, and eldest child of Joe Biden, played at Penn.
- Antonio Buehler, civil liberties activist battling police corruption, Founder of Peaceful Streets Project. (United States Military Academy)
- Jimmy Carter, former US President, played for the United States Naval Academy.
- C. J. Chivers, Pulitzer Prize winning journalist and author; played for Cornell
- Zach Iscol, US Marine Corps veteran (Bronze Star), entrepreneur, candidate in the 2021 New York City Comptroller election; played for Cornell.
- Robert Kraft, billionaire businessman and owner of the New England Patriots and the New England Revolution. (Columbia University)
- Richard W. Mies, US Navy Admiral (Defense Distinguished Service Medal); played for Navy
- Donald Rumsfeld, former Secretary of Defense, played sprint football for Princeton and was a captain.
- Vincent Viola, billionaire businessman, philanthropist. (United States Military Academy)
- Brian Bulatao, former CIA Executive Officer (COO), businessman (United States Military Academy)
- Mike Rutenberg, current Browns defensive coordinator, played three years for Cornell.

== Notable coaches ==
- George Allen, Pro Football Hall of Fame coach, most notably with the Washington Redskins, was an assistant sprint football coach at the University of Michigan in 1947.
- Jack Cloud, College Football Hall of Famer, former NFL player (in 1990); Cloud came to the Naval Academy in 1959 and spent the next 32 years in Annapolis coaching football, and the head lightweight (now called sprint) football coach from 1958–61, 1963–72, and 1980–82, in addition to teaching in the Physical Education Department.
- Dick Harter, college and NBA head coach, coached at Penn from 1958–1964.
- Tim McGuire, American football college coach; defensive coordinator for Navy
- Jack McCloskey, college and NBA head coach, coached at Penn from 1954–1955.
- Sean Morey, former NFL player, coached the Princeton sprint squad for its last two seasons of existence.
- Tony Franklin, former OC at Cal, Kentucky, Auburn, among others, offensive coordinator for Army West Point 2022.
- Mike Siani, played wide receiver for the Oakland Raiders and Baltimore Colts; was the quarterbacks and wide receivers coach for Princeton.
- Eric Tipton, College Football Hall of Famer, Major League Baseball outfielder (1939–1945); Tipton was an assistant baseball and football coach at the College of William & Mary for 18 seasons, and then was the head baseball coach and Lightweight football coach at the United States Military Academy.
- William "Wags" Wagner, Head Coach of Sprint Football at University of Pennsylvania from 1970–2019. During nearly five decades at the helm of Quaker Sprint Football, Wagner amassed 136 career wins and led his program to five Collegiate Sprint Football League titles (and the Ivy League team with best Ivy League record since 2002 is awarded the "William R. Wagner Trophy"). Wagner also served as an assistant coach for the UPenn baseball team for 35 years of his tenure.
- Michael Huyghue, former NFL vice president and UFL commissioner, has served as the head coach of Cornell since the 2024 season. He served as the Big Red's defensive coordinator for two seasons prior.

== Broadcasting ==
Television rights to sprint football leagues are generally handled through the same outlets as their schools' respective athletic conferences. Caldwell, Chestnut Hill and Mansfield games are carried via Hudl-managed platforms of the CACC and PSAC, while Penn's and Cornell's home sprint games are carried via ESPN+ as part of its Ivy League contract, with ESPN+ also carrying select other CSFL and MSFL contests. Navy streams its own games via its YouTube account.

== See also ==
- List of Collegiate Sprint Football League champions
