= Names of Australian rules football =

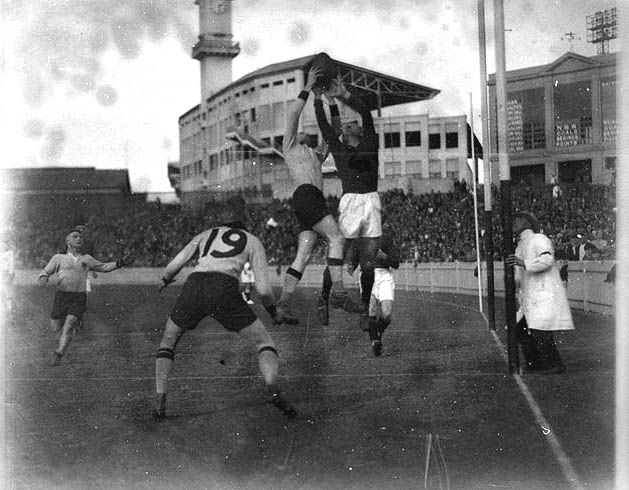
A New South Wales player outmarks a Western Australian opponent in the goal square at the 1933 Australian Football Carnival at the Sydney Cricket Ground.

The sport of Australian rules football has been called by a number of different names throughout its history. Since 1905, with the formation of the Australasian Football Council, the game has been called "Australian football". The name has been codified by the AFL Commission, as the game's name in the "Laws of Australian football". Historically, the sport has been referred to as "Victorian rules" (referring to its origins in Melbourne), the "Victorian game", "Australasian rules", the "Australian game" and "Australian national football", "national football", the "bouncing game" and, derisively, "aerial ping pong" as well as several other names. Today, the common names for the sport are "Australian Football" and "Australian rules football" and it is referred to as "football", "footy", "Aussie rules" or sometimes as "AFL" (a genericised abbreviation of Australian Football League, the sport's pre-eminent and professional competition).

== Historical names ==
The first "Rules of the Melbourne Football Club" (also known as the "Rules of the Melbourne Football Club" or, informally, the "Melbourne Rules") were established in Melbourne in 1859 by Tom Wills of the Melbourne Football Club.

By 1860, the widespread adoption of the Melbourne Rules led to it being rebranded as the "Victorian Football". It was informally referred to as "the Victorian Game" or "Victorian Rules", although in Victoria, the general term was just "football" as early as 1860.

Australian rules football in Queensland prior to the turn of the 19th Century was referred to as "Association Football" as the league had affiliated with the Victorian Football Association (VFA). However, as late as 1954, the term "Melbourne Rules" was used by newspapers in New South Wales and Queensland due to a long-held cultural rivalry. Another term was "the bouncing game", used mostly in Western Australia in the 1880s and 1890s to differentiate from the other codes, where bouncing was not permitted. The term "Bouncing Football" was introduced by West Australians early on to both the United States and Canada.

The informal name of "Australian football" was in use outside Victoria by the late 19th century. A variant of this, adopted by the Australasian Football Council acknowledging the participation of its voting member New Zealand, was "Australasian football". The 1908 Jubilee Australasian Football Carnival featured a team from New Zealand. In 1927, the Council, as part of its new focus on Australian nationalism changed its name to the Australian National Football Council. Dropping reference to Australasian also officially acknowledged that the sport was no longer being played competitively in New Zealand. The Council officially renamed the sport to "Australian National Football" (later "National Football" and "National Australian Football") in an effort to emphasise its Australian origin and further differentiate it from rugby and soccer which were becoming more popular in New South Wales, Queensland and the Australian Capital Territory. Its members' premier competitions were encouraged to include the term "Australian National Football" in their title, with the South Australian Football League (SAFL) becoming the South Australian National Football League (SANFL) in 1927, the Tasmanian Football League (TFL) becoming the Tasmanian Australian National Football League (TANFL) in 1928, and the West Australian Football League (WAFL) becoming the Western Australian National Football League (WANFL) in 1931. It was proposed that the Victorian Football League (VFL) become the Victorian Australian National Football League; however, this did not occur.

Internationally, some countries chose to drop references to Australia from the name to aid its popularity and differentiate it from rugby (because rugby sides sent by Australia to these countries were branded as the "Australian football team"). Most notably Australian rules football in the United States in the 1910s and 1920s was known simply as "Field Ball" or "Fieldball", during its revival in the 1990s, clubs chose to adopt the "Footy" moniker to differentiate it from rugby which many Americans associated with Australia. Australian rules football in Nauru was simply called "Football", despite the presence of other codes including soccer. Likewise Australian rules football in Papua New Guinea was until the 1980s referred by locals simply as "Rules" or "Rules Football". The name variations were typically also adopted by the respective governing bodies. The sport's popularity plummeted shortly after the NFL mandated that the Papua New Guineans call it Australian Rules. Branding of overseas competitions as AFL rather than Australian Football has helped standardise the sport's international brand.

Several distinctions were made in the three major footballing states regarding the quality of play across different leagues. In Victoria, the League football was considered superior to Association football (not to be confused with English association football (known as soccer); and for a time in the 1930s and 1940s, the distinction between the two competitions was necessary because they had sufficiently significant differences in rules that they were considered to be separate codes, similar to the eventual distinction between rugby league and rugby union. In Western Australia, this distinction was also made between the West Australian Football League and the West Australian Football Association (formerly the 1st Rate Juniors competition), though the latter integrated into the WAFL reserves in 1921. There was also a distinction made in WA between the "coastal" (WAFL) and "'fields" (Goldfields Football League) leagues, who played each other regularly in the state premiership. In the 19th century, there was also a distinction made in most leagues between "senior" and "junior" football; this was not to do with age, rather with quality of play.

In December 1948, a controversy occurred when Dame Enid Lyons, the Member for Darwin, referred to Australian football as "our national game" in Parliament. This was rebuffed by the Prime Minister at the time, Ben Chifley, a New South Welshman, who suggested Lyons was "treading on dangerous ground". The secretary of the ANFC, Percy Page, sent a telegram reading: "Congratulations on your stand. The Prime Minister's obvious lack of knowledge of Australian sport is most regrettable."

In 1958, the Australian National Football Council sought to officially rename "Australian Rules Football" to make it more accessible, "Mark" was the outright winner of the "Rename The Game" newspaper poll, with "Rules" and "Footy" being the other popular choices. Despite the poll, a name change was not initiated.

In 1990, the AFL Commission adopted the name "Australian Football" as the sport's official name to reflect its governance at the highest level, and this is the name given to the sport in the Laws of the Game.

== Nicknames ==
The most common nicknames for the sport are "footy" and "Aussie rules". For much of the middle part of the 20th century, particularly in Canberra, the latter was shortened further to simply "Rules", this usage is generally obsolete in Australia.

The term "AFL" (abbreviation of Australian Football League) is mistakenly used to refer to the sport, mostly by newcomers to Australian Football in areas where the sport has not been widely played and the name of the pre-eminent competition is better known than the name of the sport. The Australian Football League has encouraged competitions to include the term "AFL" in their name: the Queensland Football League changed its name to AFL Queensland in 1999. The Australian Football League took over the business of the New South Wales Australian Football League Ltd and changed the name of the competitions from Sydney Football League (SFL) to Sydney AFL in 1998 and Australian Capital Territory Football League to AFL Canberra in 1999. Leagues outside of Australia affiliated to the AFL also make use of this term. Most major newspapers in Australia use either "AFL" or "football" to refer to the sport.

The derogatory term "aerial ping-pong" is sometimes used mockingly to refer to the sport.
