= Names for association football =

Terms used to describe association football

External image
- A depiction of regional names overlaid on a colour-coded world map.

Association football is often abbreviated to "football" where it is the main code of football but in places where other codes of football, such as rugby football, Gaelic football, gridiron football or Australian football, are popular, association football is often known as "soccer" (Note: Coined from assoc. of association football) to distinguish it.

== Background ==
In English, the word football was known in writing by the 14th century, as laws which prohibit similar games date back to at least that century.

The football rules of Rugby football were codified in 1845. Association football rules were codified by the Football Association in England, in 1863. The alternative name soccer was coined in late 19th century England to help distinguish Association football from other football codes. Soccer is an abbreviation of the slang "associationer" (from "Association footballer") and first appeared in English public schools and universities in the 1880s (sometimes using the variant spelling "socker"). The word "soccer" is sometimes credited to Charles Wreford-Brown, an Oxford University student said to have been fond of shortened forms such as brekkers for breakfast and rugger for rugby football (see Oxford "-er") but the attribution is generally considered to be spurious. Clive Toye notes that "they took the third, fourth and fifth letters of Association and called it SOCcer."

Some clubs in rugby or other football code strongholds adopted the suffix Association Football Club (A.F.C.) or "Soccer Club" to avoid confusion with other football codes in their area. FIFA, the world governing body for the sport, is a French-language acronym of "Fédération Internationale de Football Association" – the International Federation of Association Football. "Soccer football" has been used sometimes. The United States Soccer Federation was known as the United States Soccer Football Association from 1945 until 1974. The Canadian Soccer Association was known as the Canadian Soccer Football Association from 1958 to 1971.

=== Transition away from soccer in Britain and spread of football in Britain and Commonwealth ===
For nearly a hundred years after it was first coined, soccer was used in Britain as an uncontroversial abbreviation of Association football, in formal speech and in writing. "Soccer" was more commonly used by the more educated and those of wider experiences, whereas "football" was more commonly used by the less educated and insular working class adherents of the sport, while working class adherents of Rugby League used the term "soccer". With the popularity of what was the English Football Association football code in other countries where it was called "football", that term was imported into Britain with migration, ties with Europe and globalization of media resulting in the decline in use of soccer. In the early twenty-first century, association football organizations in Australia and New Zealand, where use of "soccer" was prevalent, have promoted the use of "football" to mirror international usage and, particularly in Australia, to rebrand a sport that had been experiencing image troubles. The attempts to occupy the name "football" in the face of other football codes have not taken effect well in Australia.

== English-speaking countries ==
Usage of the alternatives "Association football" "soccer" or "football" vary in and among the countries and territories where English is the prevalent language. In many places, such as the United Kingdom, all three terms are used. Association football is known as "football" in the Commonwealth Caribbean (including Trinidad and Tobago, (Note: The nickname of the Trinidad & Tobago national team, "The Soca Warriors", refers to soca, a style of music. The word is actually a "SOul of CAlypso", not a variant spelling of "soccer".) Jamaica, Belize, Barbados, and others), Nepal, Malta, India, Bangladesh, Nigeria, Cameroon, Pakistan, Liberia, Singapore, Hong Kong and others, stretching over many regions including parts of Europe, Asia, Africa, the Caribbean and Central America. In North America and Australia, where approximately 70 per cent of native English speakers reside, soccer is the primary term.

=== North America ===
In the United States, where American football is more popular, the word football is used to refer to that sport. Association football is most commonly referred to as soccer.

As early as 1911, there were several names in use for the sport in the Americas. A 29 December 1911 New York Times article reporting on the addition of the game as an official collegiate sport in the US referred to it as "association football", "soccer" and "soccer football" all in a single article.

The names of Association football organization in the United States, such as United States Soccer Federation reflect the common usage. The federation was originally called the U.S. Football Association and was formed in 1913 by the merger of the American Football Association and the American Amateur Football Association. The word "soccer" was added to the name in 1945, making it the U.S. Soccer Football Association. The word "football" was dropped in 1974.

In Canada, the term "football" most commonly refers to gridiron football (either Canadian football or American football; i.e. football canadien or le football américain in Standard French). "Soccer" is used for association football in Canadian English and, similarly, le soccer is used in Canadian French. The Canada Soccer Association is a national-level organization, although its original name was the Dominion of Canada Football Association. Likewise, in the majority-francophone Quebec, provincial, there is Soccer Québec (previously Fédération de soccer du Québec). This is unusual compared to francophone countries, where football is more commonly used.

Some teams based in Canada and the United States have adopted the abbreviation FC as a suffix or prefix in their names. In Major League Soccer, these include Atlanta United FC, Austin FC, Charlotte FC, Chicago Fire FC, FC Cincinnati, FC Dallas, Houston Dynamo FC, Los Angeles FC, Minnesota United FC, New York City FC, San Diego FC, Seattle Sounders FC, Toronto FC, and Vancouver Whitecaps FC. Two Major League Soccer teams, (Inter Miami CF and CF Montréal) use CF as a suffix or prefix in their names, reflecting the Spanish-speaking and Francophone communities where they play. Most teams in the Canadian Premier League use FC as a suffix. Exceptions are FC Edmonton (now defunct) and FC Supra du Québec which use a prefix, and Atlético Ottawa which uses neither, to match its parent Atlético Madrid.

In Central America, the only country in which English language is prevalent is Belize and, like the other six Central American nations, the term football refers to association football, as used in the Football Federation of Belize and in the Belize Premier Football League, but the term soccer is sometimes used in vernacular speech and media coverage.

In the Caribbean, most of the English-speaking members use the term football for their federations and leagues, the exception being the U.S. Virgin Islands, where both the federation and league use the word soccer, but both terms are known and understood.

An exceptional case is the largely Spanish-speaking Puerto Rico, where the word football is used in the Puerto Rican Football Federation, while the word soccer is used in the Puerto Rico Soccer League, the Puerto Rican 1st division; however, its 2nd division is named Liga Nacional de Futbol de Puerto Rico. Soccer is the most common term in vernacular speech, however. Another case is the Dutch island of Sint Maarten, where soccer was used in Sint Maarten Soccer Federation, but it is now the Sint Maarten Football Federation.

=== Australia ===
In Australian, the sport has been mainly referred to as soccer. This is primarily due to Australian rules football, rugby union and rugby league taking precedence of the name football in conversation due to their greater cultural prominence and popularity – similarly to North America along with American football and Canadian football. However, in 2005, the Australia Soccer Association changed its name to Football Federation Australia and Football Australia Limited, and it now encourages the use of "football" to describe the association football code. All its state and territory member organisations and many clubs and some media outlets and politicians have followed. In the Macquarie Dictionary, it was observed that, "While it is still the case that, in general use, soccer is the preferred term in Australia for what most of the world calls football, the fact that the peak body in Australia has officially adopted the term football for this sport will undoubtedly cause a shift in usage." The Australian men's team is still known by its long-standing nickname, the Socceroos and the Soccer Ashes are still referred to as such, and "soccer" is still the most popular term for the sport in Australia.

Historically, what was a derogatory term, "wogball" was often used to refer to the sport, "wog" being a derogatory (but since appropriated in some contexts) term referring to Australians of Mediterranean background (particularly Croatians, Egyptians, Greeks, Italians, Lebanese, Macedonians, Maltese and Turks), among whom the sport was popular.

==== Australian media ====
Debate over whether "soccer" or "football" should be used has extended to the media. Many media outlets, like the populace, use the different terms interchangeably, in context.

Association football is referred to as "football" by many outlets, including ABC News, News.com.au and The Australian. However, many others still use the term "soccer", including The Sydney Morning Herald and The West Australian.

=== New Zealand ===
In New Zealand English, association football has historically been called "soccer". As late as 2005, the New Zealand Oxford Dictionary suggested that in New Zealand, "football" referred especially to rugby union; it also noted that rugby union was commonly called "rugby", while rugby league was called "league". A year earlier, New Zealand Soccer had changed the name of its leading competition to the New Zealand Football Championship and, in 2007, it changed its own name to New Zealand Football. According to The New Zealand Herald, "most people no longer think or talk of rugby as 'football'. A transformation has quietly occurred, and most people are happy to apply that name to the world's most popular game, dispensing with 'soccer' in the process."

=== Papua New Guinea ===
In Papua New Guinea and other parts of Melanesia, the term "soccer" is the more common term for the sport, due to the large Australian influence in the region. In Papua New Guinea, the national association is the Papua New Guinea Football Association but the national league is the Papua New Guinea Premier Soccer League. In Tok Pisin, "soka" refers to "soccer", "ragbi" refers to both rugby union and rugby league and "futbal" refers to other codes of football (i.e. Australian rules football, or "futbal bilong Ostrelia").

=== Other English-speaking countries ===
On the island of Ireland, "football" or "footballer" can refer to either association football or Gaelic football. However it may also refer to rugby union. The association football federations are called the Football Association of Ireland (FAI) in Ireland and the Irish Football Association (IFA) in Northern Ireland. Furthermore, those whose primary interest lies in association football often call their sport "football" and refer to Gaelic football as "Gaelic football" or "Gaelic" (although they may also use "soccer"). The term "soccer" is most commonly used in Ireland's media to refer to association football.

In most of Ulster, the northern province in Ireland, especially in Northern Ireland, East Donegal and Inishowen, association football is usually referred to as 'football' while Gaelic football is usually referred to as 'Gaelic'.

In Pakistan, Liberia, Nigeria, both football and soccer are used.

== Non-English-speaking countries ==
Association football, was exported by the British to the rest of the world and, in many of these nations, the English term was adopted into their own language. This was often done in one of two ways: either by directly importing the word itself, or as a calque by translating its constituent parts, foot and ball.

=== From English football ===
- Albanian: futboll
- Armenian: ֆուտբոլ (futbol)
- Bangla: ফুটবল (phutbol)
- Catalan: futbol
- Cyrillic-spelled languages:
  - Belarusian, Kazakh, Kyrgyz, Russian, Tajik: футбол (futbol)
    - Bulgarian: футбол (futbol), the sport was initially called ритнитоп (ritnitop, literally "kickball"); footballers are still sometimes mockingly called ритнитопковци (ritnitopkovtsi "ball kickers") today.
    - Ukrainian: футбол (futbol), occasionally called копаний м'яч (kopanyi myach), literally "kicked ball" or simply копаний (kopanyi)
  - Macedonian, Serbian: фудбал (fudbal)
- Czech: fotbal (kopaná for "kick game" is also used)
- Filipino: futbol (ᜉᜓᜆ᜔ᜊᜓᜎ᜔ in baybayin)
- French: football (except in Canadian French where it is soccer)
- Galician: fútbol
- Hindi: फ़ुटबॉल (futbol)
- Japanese:フットボール (futtobōru: represents "football") is used as variant or in general term, but サッカー (sakkā: represents "soccer") is most commonly used in Japanese, as in 日本サッカー協会 (lit. Japan Soccer Association, the official English name of which is the Japan Football Association). From 1885 to around 1908 in the Meiji era, fūtobōru (フートボール) was the most common and assoshieshon (アッソシエーション) was also used, and these were often written together with kemari (蹴鞠), a game of the Heian period. From the Taisho era to the early Showa era, ashiki futtobōru (ア式フットボール), ashiki shūkyū (ア式蹴球) and shūkyū (蹴球) were often used.
- Kannada: ಫುಟ್‌ಬಾಲ್ (phutball)
- Latvian: futbols
- Lithuanian: futbolas
- Malayalam: ഫുട്ബോൾ (phutball)
- Maltese: futbol
- Marathi: फुट्बॉल् (phutball)
- Persian: فوتبال (futbâl)
- Polish: futbol, as well as the native term piłka nożna literally "leg-ball" ("piłka" means "ball" and "nożna" is an adjective referring to leg)
- Portuguese: futebol
- Romanian: fotbal
- Slovak: futbal
- Spanish: fútbol or futbol; the calque balompié, from the words "balón" (ball) and "pie" (foot), is seldom used.
- Telugu: ఫుట్‌బాల్ (phutball)
- Thai: ฟุตบอล (fút-bol)
- Turkish: futbol
- Uzbek: futbol
- Yiddish: פוטבאָל (futbol)

This commonality is reflected in the auxiliary languages Esperanto and Interlingua, which utilize futbalo and football, respectively.

=== Literal translations of foot ball (calques) ===
- Arabic: كرة القدم (kurat al-qadam; however, in vernacular Arabic, كرة (kura), meaning "ball", is far more common. فوتبول (fūtbōl) is also fairly common, particularly in the former French colonies of Morocco, Algeria, and Tunisia.)
- Breton: mell-droad
- Bulgarian: ритнитоп (ritnitop), literally "kickball"
- Chinese: 足球 (Hanyu Pinyin: zúqiú; Jyutping: zuk^{1} kau^{4}; Wugniu: tsoq^{7} jieu^{2}) from 足; 'foot' and 球; 'ball'. Used in most varieties of Chinese, with the word for 'ball' often also referring to football in compounds (cf. 'to play football': Cantonese 踢波; tek^{3} bo^{1}, Shanghainese 踢球; thiq^{7} jieu^{2})

- In some varieties such as Taiwanese Hakka, 腳球 (in Simplified characters: 脚球) is used, which substitutes the word for 'foot' with 腳.
- In Min Chinese varieties, 跤球 (Hokkien Peh-oe-ji: kha-kiû; Hokchiu Bang-ua-ce: kă-giù) is used instead. The compound also decomposes into 'foot' + 'ball'.

- Danish: fodbold
- Dutch: voetbal
- Estonian: jalgpall
- Faroese: fótbóltur
- Finnish: jalkapallo
- Georgian: ფეხბურთი (pekhburti), from ფეხი (pekhi = foot) and ბურთი (burti = ball).
- German: Fußball
- Greek: ποδόσφαιρο (podosphero), from πόδι (podi) = "foot" and σφαίρα (sphera) = "sphere" or "ball". In Cypriot Greek, the sport is called "mappa" (μάππα), which means "ball" in this dialect.
- Hebrew: כדורגל (kaduregel), a portmanteau of the words "כדור" (kadur: ball) and "רגל" (regel: foot, leg).
- Icelandic: fótbolti, but knattspyrna (from knöttur ("ball") + spyrna ("kicking")) is almost equally used.
- Karelian: jalgamiäččy
- Kinyarwanda: umupira w'amaguru(from umupira ("ball") + amaguru ("legs"), literally "ball of legs")
- Latvian: kājbumba (the historic name in the first half of the 20th century, a literal translation from English).
- Malayalam: Kaalppanthu, from "Kaal" (foot) and "Panthu" (ball).
- Manx: bluckan coshey
- Northern Sámi: juolgespábba, from juolgi (foot) and spábba (ball) or spábbačiekčan, from čiekčat (kick).
- Norwegian: fotball
- Polish: piłka nożna, from piłka (ball) and noga (leg).
- Scottish Gaelic: ball-coise
- Sinhala: පා පන්දු = paa pandu
- Somali: kubada cagta - kubada "ball" and cagta"feet or foot".
- Swahili: mpira wa miguu, from mpira (ball), wa (of) and miguu (feet/legs).
- Swedish: fotboll
- Tamil: கால்பந்து, கால் (kaal) = foot and பந்து (pandhu) = ball
- Ukrainian: occasionally called копаний м'яч (kopanyi myach), literally "kicked ball" or simply копанка (kopanka)
- Vietnamese: bóng đá (ball - kick)
- Welsh: pêl-droed

In the first half of the 20th century, in Spanish and Portuguese, new words were created to replace "football"; balompié (balón and pie meaning "ball" and "foot") and ludopédio (from words meaning "game" and "foot") respectively. However, these words were not widely accepted and are now only used in club names such as Real Betis Balompié and Albacete Balompié.

=== From soccer ===
- Afrikaans: sokker, echoing the predominant use of "soccer" in South African English.
- Australian Kriol: soka
- Bislama: soka
- Bulgarian: сокър (sokur)
- Canadian French: soccer, pronounced like the English word. In Quebec, in New-Brunswick, etc. the word football refers either to American or Canadian football, following the usage of English-speaking North America.
- Fijian: soka
- Irish: sacar (Note: In Irish, peil means "football", both the sport and the ball. The word is not cognate with English ball or Spanish pelota but rather with English pile, relating to the stuffing which filled the ball in the medieval football game of caid. Usually Gaelic football is peil and association football is sacar, although the latter is occasionally peil, as in the official Irish name of the Football Association of Ireland Cumann Peile na hÉireann. Somewhat less rare is the use of peileadóir "footballer" rather than imreoir sacair "soccer player". The Irish component of Interactive Terminology for Europe uses sacar in the Irish translations of the names of FIFA and UEFA (an Comhaontas Idirnáisiúnta Sacair and Aontas Chumainn Sacair na hEorpa respectively, literally "International Soccer Federation" and "Union of Soccer Associations of Europe"), although in practice the same acronyms are used as in English.)
- Japanese: sakkā (サッカー) is more common than futtobōru (フットボール) because of American influence following World War II. While the Japan Football Association uses the word "football" in its official English name, the Association's Japanese name uses sakkā.
- Manx Gaelic: soccar or sackyr
- Māori: hoka
- Pijin: soka
- Samoan: soka
- Swahili: soka
- Tok Pisin: soka
- Tongan: soka
- Torres Strait Creole: soka

=== Other forms ===
- Bosnian, Croatian, Slovene: nogomet. The word is derived from "noga" (meaning "leg") and "met" (meaning "to throw"), hence "throwing the ball using legs".
- In Burmese, where the game was introduced in the 1880s by Sir James George Scott, it is called ball-pwe, a pwe being a rural all-night dance party, something like a rave.
- In Erzya: пильгеоска (pilgeoska).
- In Hungarian, futball or labdarúgás (meaning ball-kicking), but foci is used in the common language.
- In Indonesian, the term sepak bola ("ball kicking") is used whereas Malaysian and Singaporean Malay use bola sepak ("kickball"); the latter is famously attested in the 1859 Jawi booklet Inilah Risalat Peraturan Bola Sepak Yang Dinamai oleh Inggeris Football ("This is a Rulebook for Kick-ball that the English call Football") printed in Singapore.
- Irish: peil
- Italian: calcio (from calciare, meaning to kick), although football is also universally understood, as many clubs include Football Club in their official denomination. This is due to the game's resemblance to Calcio Fiorentino, a 16th-century ceremonial Florentine court ritual, that has now been revived under the name calcio storico or calcio in costume (historical kick or kick in costume).
- Korean is the one of if not the only language within the Sinosphere that still primarily uses a name derived from the ancient sport of cuju (蹴鞠; Baxter QYS: tshjuwk gjuwk), appending the first syllable of the word with the term for ball, 球, in the word chukgu (축구; 蹴球).
- In Khmer, the term "បាល់ទាត់" (kick-ball) is used.
- In Komi: коксяр (koksyar).
- Lao: ເຕະບານ is derived from the following words: ເຕະ ("kick") and ບານ ("ball")
- In Navajo: jooł nabízníltaałí, meaning "ball is kicked around".
- In Swahili, the word kandanda which has no transparent etymology, is used alongside mpira wa miguu and soka.
- In Vietnamese, the terms "bóng đá" and "đá banh" (the latter is only used in certain regions), both literally meaning "ball-kicking", are used to denote "football". Sometimes the Sino-Vietnamese term "túc cầu" (足球) is used.

=== Other terminology ===
Aside from the name of the game itself, other foreign words based on English football terms include versions in many languages of the word goal (often gol in Romance languages). In German-speaking Switzerland, schútte (Basel) or tschuutte (Zürich), derived from the English shoot, means 'to play football'. Also, words derived from kick have found their way into German (noun Kicker) and Swedish (verb kicka). In France le penalty means a penalty kick. However, the phrase tir au but (lit. shot(s) on the goal) is often used in the context of a penalty shootout. In Bulgaria a penalty kick is called duzpa (дузпа, from French words douze pas – twelve steps). In Italy, alongside the term calcio, pallone is often used (literally ball in Italian), especially in Sicily (u palluni). In Hong Kong, the word 十二碼 (Jyutping: sap^{6} ji^{6} maa^{5}; lit. 'twelve-yard') refers to the penalty kick, which is at 12 yards away from the goal line.

In Portuguese, besides golo (gol in Brazilian Portuguese) and penálti (pênalti), a defender may be called a beque, from English "back", and the action of kicking a ball is called chuto (chute), adapted from English "shoot". This term was verbalised as chutar, which eventually became, in Brazil, the most common verb for kicking something in general.
