= Fullback (rugby league) =

Position in rugby league football

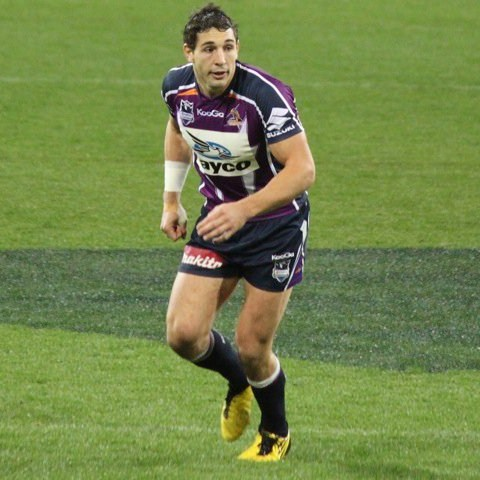
Billy Slater, Australia, Queensland and Melbourne Storm former fullback

Fullback (or full-back) is one of the positions in a rugby league football team. Typically wearing jersey number 1, the fullback is a member of the team's 'back-line' (No. 1-7). The position's name comes from their duty of standing the furthest back in defence, behind the forwards (8-13), half backs (6 and 7) and the three-quarter backs (2-5). Fullbacks are therefore the last line of defence, having to tackle any opposition players and regather the ball from any kicks that make it through their teammates. It is for this reason that the fullback is also referred to as the sweeper or custodian. Being able to secure high bomb kicks is a highly sought quality in fullbacks.

Fullback is also one of the most important positions in attack, handling the ball nearly every set of six and often running into open space on the field. Therefore, together with the two half backs and hooker, fullback is one of the four key positions that make up what is referred to as a team's 'spine'. Because the fullback makes the most support runs, players in the fullback role complete more very high-intensity running than any other position.

The Rugby League International Federation's Laws of the Game state that the 'fullback' is to be numbered 1. However, traditionally players' jersey numbers have varied, and in the modern Super League, each squad's players are assigned individual numbers regardless of position.

== Notable fullbacks ==
Fullbacks who feature in their respective nations' rugby league halls of fame are France's Puig Aubert, Australia's Clive Churchill and Charles Fraser, Wales' Jim Sullivan and New Zealand's Des White. Churchill's and Darren Lockyer's attacking flair as players are credited with having changed the role of the fullback.

== See also ==
- Rugby league positions
- Rugby league gameplay
