= Hooker (rugby league) =

Position in rugby league

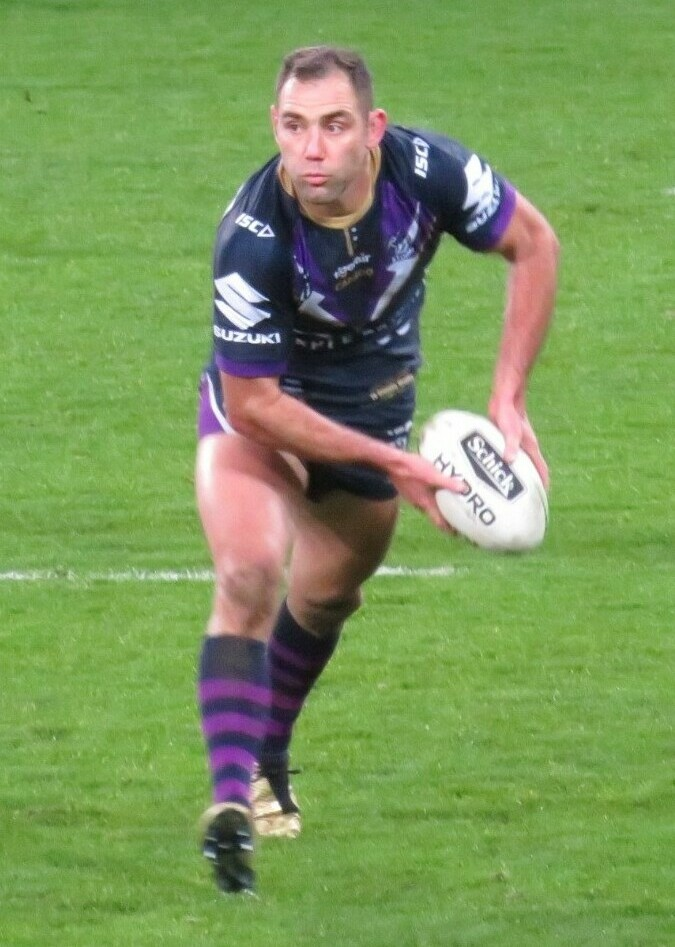
Cameron Smith holds the NRL records for matches played, points scored, goals kicked, tackles made, and grand final points scored. Hookers such as Cameron Smith usually perform the role of "dummy half", picking the ball up to start play following a play-the-ball.

Hooker is one of the positions in a rugby league football team. Usually wearing jersey or shirt number 9, the hooker is one of the team's forwards. During scrums the hooker plays in the front row, and the position's name comes from their role of 'hooking' or 'raking' the ball back with the foot. For this reason the hooker is sometimes referred to in Australia as the rake. Hookers have a great deal of contact with the ball, as they usually play the role of acting halfback or dummy half, picking the ball up from the play-the-ball that follows a tackle. Hookers therefore have much responsibility in that they then decide what to do with the ball, whether that be to pass it (and to whom), run with it, or occasionally to kick it. Therefore, together with the two halves and fullback, hooker is one of the four key positions that make up what is sometimes called a team's 'spine'. A trend of halves converting into hookers followed the introduction of the 10 metre rule, and many players have switched between these positions in their careers such as Geoff Toovey, Andrew Johns, Craig Gower and Peter Wallace.

The laws of rugby league state that the hooker is to wear the number 9. However, in some leagues such as Super League, shirt numbers do not have to conform to this system.

One book published in 1996 stated that in senior rugby league, the hooker and stand-off/five-eighth handled the ball more often than any other position. In the 2013 NRL season, the six players with the most tackles were all hookers.

== Notable hookers ==
Hookers that feature in their nations' rugby league halls of fame are New Zealand's Jock Butterfield and Australia's Ken Kearney, Sandy Pearce, Cameron Smith and Noel Kelly. The most-capped British international hooker was Wales' Tommy Harris.

== See also ==
- Rugby league gameplay
