= Super League International Board =

- Founded: 1995
- Ceased: 1998
- Replaced by: Rugby League International Federation
- Responsibility: Super League worldwide
- Key people: Maurice Lindsay (Chair)
- As of 30 November 2009

The Super League International Board was the international governing body for Super League-aligned rugby league football nations between 1995 and 1998.

The Board was formed to administer Super League globally during the Super League war, a corporate dispute fought in and out of court during the mid-1990s by the Rupert Murdoch and News Corporation-backed Super League (Australia) and the Kerry Packer and Optus Vision-backed Australian Rugby League organisations over broadcasting rights for, and ultimately control of the top-level professional rugby league football competition in Australasia.

== Board ==
In December 1995, the Board was formed in Sydney, Australia. Maurice Lindsay, the chief executive of the British Rugby Football League was elected the Board's first chairperson. Lindsay was also the British delegate. John Ribot, the chief executive of Super League (Australia) and a key figure in the Super League project, became Deputy Chairman.

In response to his election, Lindsay shared the thoughts he and Ribot had on the future of the sport under Super League:

Having spent a lifetime in the game and been so heavily involved in international rugby league for so many years, I am very excited. John and I share the same values and belief that our game has been world sport's best kept secret for far too long.

— Maurice Lindsay

== Role ==
The Super League International Board's responsibilities included controlling the laws of the game.

Several new rules had been trialled in Britain and the Board, during its inaugural meeting, decided they should be introduced to other Super League-aligned nations worldwide. The four rule changes related to the play-the-ball, kick-off and scrums.

== Competitions ==
In 1996, a ruling in the high court meant that Super League would be able to run a domestic competition in Australia the next year. The ruling meant that the Super League International Board was able operate several international competitions, including the 1997 World Club Championship which consisted of 12 European and 10 Australasian sides. The European clubs struggled in the competition and did not perform well financially.

In 1996 and 1997 the Super League World Nines competition was held. Nines rugby league is a faster form of the game with only nine players on the field at a time playing in shorter halves. The World Nines competitions were held as an alternative to the Australian Rugby League's World Sevens. The 1996 World Nines saw a video referee was used for the first time for a game of rugby league.

Under the Super League International Board, competition between national teams was organised. In 1997, Great Britain hosted the Australian Super League test team, losing the series 2–1. The Australian side also played New Zealand. The Rugby Football League and New Zealand Rugby League recognise these matches as having test match status, while the Australian Rugby League has declined to include in its records those of its rival. This actually means that Matt Adamson, Ken Nagas, Paul Green, Craig Greenhill, Solomon Haumono, Julian O'Neill and David Peachey, all of whom only ever represented the Super League version of the Australian team, are listed as never having played a test for Australia in official Australian records.

== Super League war ==
The creation of the board was expected to weaken the position of the Australian Rugby League, increasing their isolation.

During 1995, more rugby league governing bodies outside Australia, such as France and Papua New Guinea, signed on with Super League, joining Britain and New Zealand. These agreements had the effect of "usurping" the international board's control of the sport and removing international playing opposition for the Australian Rugby League's representative sides. The director-general of the international board was the Australian Rugby League's chairman, Ken Arthurson.

In 1998, the Super League International Board was disestablished and replaced by the Rugby League International Federation (RLIF) as the Super League war ended in Australia and international rugby league reunited. The replacement saw worldwide governance of rugby league handed back to the sport's national governing bodies.

Peace is breaking out all over the world...it was just a matter of getting everyone around the table.

— Neil Tunnicliffe, chief executive, Rugby Football League

John McDonald, the chair of the Australian Rugby League, became chair of the RLIF. Sir Rodney Walker was elected a member of the RLIF, beating Maurice Lindsay and signifying a power shift in the British game. Walker took the position of vice-chair.

One of the Rugby League International Federation's first tasks upon assuming control was to re-codify the Laws of the Game following the divergence that occurred whilst the game was split.

During their attempts to attract partners, the Super League International Board agreed to give a place in their planned 1998 world cup to the New Zealand Māori rugby league team at a meeting in Paris in 1997. Despite that world cup not taking place, the Rugby League International Federation repeated the offer for the 2000 World Cup and the team competed as "Aotearoa Māori".
