= Mercat Marsans =

Coordinates: 41.3614°N 2.0750°E

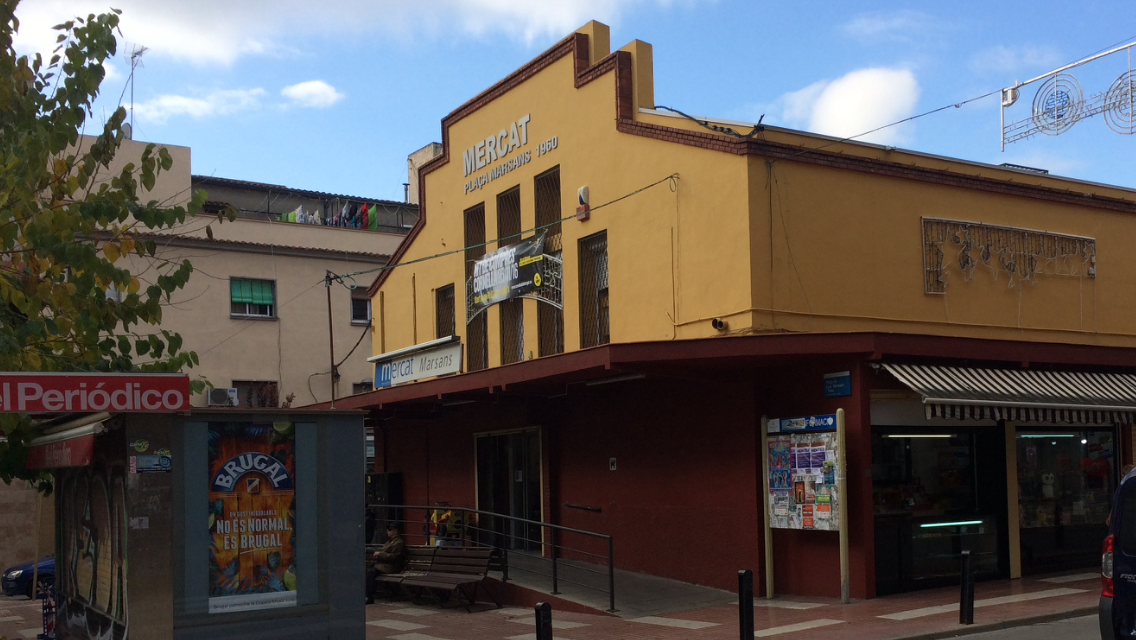
East façade of the market.

Mercat Marsans is one of the three public markets of Cornellà de Llobregat (Catalonia, Spain), located in La Gavarra neighborhood.

It was opened on 25 September 1960, to manage the population growth that occurred in Cornellà in the late forties and early fifties, being the second market built in the city after Mercat del Centre. At first, it consisted of 71 Market stalls of different food products. It was built on municipal property that had previously been occupied by the old Cornellà rugby field. Previously, they had been part of a bigger estate that belonged to the Barcelona banker Lluís Marsans i Peix, of whom the current market and its square took name.
