= Laws of rugby =

Laws of rugby may refer to:

- Laws of rugby league
- Laws of rugby union
