= Glossary of rugby league terms =

Rugby league football has accrued considerable jargon to describe aspects of the game. Many terms originate in the Laws of the Game. Some aspects of the game have more than one term referring to them. Different terms have become popularly used to describe an aspect of the game in different places, with notable differences between the Northern and Southern Hemispheres.

Words in a sentence which are also defined elsewhere in this glossary appear in italics.

== 0–9 ==
10-metre law
When a player is tackled, all defenders except for a maximum of two markers must retreat 10 metres from the play-the-ball area.
18th man
A player selected as a back-up to the 17-person squad for a game. The 18th man usually warms up with the team before a match, and may be called on to play if one of the 17 players is injured or ill before the start of the match. The term is also sometimes used informally to refer to a team's supporters, and the squad number 18 may be reserved for this purpose.
20 metre restart
The 20 metre line is used to re-start the game in certain circumstances:
1. The phrase "20 metre re-start" is most commonly used to refer to an optional kick. (One of those options is to tap on the 20-metre line and run the ball.)
2. A 20-metre line drop out is taken by the defending team if the ball goes dead in their in-goal from a penalty kick by their opponents.
40/20 rule
If a player less than 40 metres away from their own try line kicks a ball in general play which bounces in the field of play and goes into touch inside their opponents' 20-metre area, their side restart the game with a tap 20 metres from the touchline and level with where the ball went out of play (but no closer than 10 metres from the defending team's goal line).

== A ==
A-defender
The defender in the defensive line who is immediately to the right or left of the play-the-ball.
Above the horizontal
One determinant of a dangerous tackle – defenders lifting an attacking player off the ground so their feet are higher than their head. Lifting a player this way can be a precursor to the outlawed spear tackle.
Advantage
Advantage is the period of time after an infringement in which the non-offending side have the opportunity to gain sufficient territory or tactical opportunity to negate the need to stop the game due to the infringement. The referee will signal advantage with their arm out horizontally, toward the non-infringing team. If no tactical or territorial advantage is gained, the referee will whistle and give the decision which had been delayed. If sufficient advantage is gained, the referee will call "advantage over" and play will continue. Advantage allows the game to flow more freely.
Advantage line
An imaginary line across the pitch when there is a breakdown in open play (a play-the-ball or scrum). Advancing across the advantage line represents a gain in territory. Also called the "gain line".
Ankle tap
An ankle tap, also referred to as a tap-tackle, may be used by a defender chasing the attacking player carrying the ball if that player is about to evade them and a conventional tackle is not possible. If the defender cannot get close enough to the ball-carrier to wrap their arms around them in a conventional tackle, they may still be able to dive at the other player's feet and – with outstretched arm – tap or hook the player's foot (or feet). This will often bring the ball-carrier down, and may sufficiently delay the attacker for a defender to complete the tackle or for the defending team to organise their defence.
Against the grain
When an attacking player makes an off-the-ball run in the opposite direction of the attack. If the attacking side are passing the ball to the left edge, the runner against the grain is running back to the middle of the pitch.
Around the corner kicking
See round the corner kicking.

== B ==
Ball and all
A type of tackle which prevents the player being tackled from offloading the ball to a teammate who might, before the tackle was completed, carry on the attack. This prevents the player being tackled from moving their arms effectively.
Ball-carrier
The player in possession of the ball.
Ball-carrying arm
A tackle is judged to be complete is when the attacking player's ball-carrying arm is touching the ground at the same time that a defending player is in contact with the attacker.
Ball back
If the ball enters touch, play is restarted by a scrum where the ball left the field of play. The exception is when the ball is kicked into touch without bouncing inside the field of play (on the full). In this case, the scrum is taken from where the ball was kicked. The ball returns to the team who did not kick it out of bounds. Ball back is waived if a side elects to kick a penalty into touch.
Banana kick
A medium-range kick in general play which goes off the side of the kicker, rather than in front, for chasers further afield. The banana kick, less predictable than conventional kicks, is so named because the ball's rise and fall resembles the curve of a banana.
Biff
Fighting.
Bend the line
The ball carrier takes a strong carry by putting the defenders on the back foot, bending the defensive line.
Black dot
The underside of the crossbar connecting the goal posts will have a mark in the centre, usually black in colour, which is known as the "black dot". The black dot can be used as an aid to kickers in aiming. A player scoring a try in the centre of the goal line or in goal (beneath the posts) scores "under the black dot".
Blindside
The narrow side of the pitch in relation to a scrum or a play the ball; the opposite of openside.
Blood replacement (obsolete)
See Interchange.
Bomb
See Bomb (kick).
Break
A breach of the line of defenders by the player in possession of the ball on the attacking team.
Bridging (obsolete)
Bridging refers to a team linking or binding players together at the play-the-ball into a scrum-like formation.
Broken-time (obsolete)
Broken-time payments compensated players for time missed from work due to rugby. The payments were an issue which led to the schism of rugby football in England, and were the original payment system of the Northern Rugby Football Union in 1895.
Bust
A bust, or tackle bust, is when a player breaks through an attempted tackle.
Bumper bars
When the ball carrier runs into contact and uses their forearms to initiate contact with the defenders, protecting the ball.

== C ==
Cannonball
A dangerous tackle in which a defender attacks the legs of a stationary, standing player who is held upright by other tacklers.
Caution
See team warning.
Centre
The centres, or "centre three-quarters" (numbered 4 and 5), are positioned one in from the wings and complete what is known as the three-quarter line. They are divided into left and right centres. Usually the best mixture of power and vision, their main role is to create attacking opportunities for their team and defend those of the opposition. With the wingers, centres score frequently.
Changeover
Another term for handover.
Charge-down
Blocking an attacker's kick as the ball rises from the foot. Done with outstretched arms and hands, this is not a knock-on.
Checkside punt
Chicken-wing
A shoulder-lock wrestling technique, often used to slow down play-the-ball, which places "undue pressure" on a player's joints. It is punishable under Section 15, Law 1 (i) of the Laws of the Game as "contrary to the true spirit of the game".
Club call
A feature of the Super League play-offs from 2009 to 2014 in which the highest-ranked team from the regular season table to win their match in the first week of the play-offs could select their opponents for their next game (a qualifying semi-final in week three) from the teams who won their preliminary semi-final in week two.
Completion rate
The percentage of times that a team holds the ball for a full set of six tackles.
Conversion
If a team scores a try, they have an opportunity to "convert" it for two more points by kicking the ball between the posts and above the crossbar (through the goal). The kick is taken at any point on the field in line with the point that the ball was grounded for the try parallel to the touch-lines. It is advantageous to score a try nearer to the posts, since it is easier to convert it. The kick can be a drop or place kick.
Cover defence
An attempt to tackle an attacker who has breached the main line of defenders.
Crash ball
An attacking tactic where a player receives a pass at pace and runs directly at the opposition's defensive line. The crash-ball runner attempts to commit two or more opposing players to the tackle, then attempts to make the ball available to team-mates by off-loading in the tackle or recycling the ball quickly from the ruck. By committing players to the tackle, the crash-ball runner pierces the opposition's defense.
Crash tackle
Another name for the crash ball.
Crusher tackle
A dangerous tackle in which a grounded player's chin is forced down towards his torso.
Cut out pass
Also known as a "cut out ball", "face ball", or "face pass", the ball is passed by an attacking player across the front of one of their teammates and caught by a teammate positioned further away. This pass may be used to move the ball more speedily away from defenders who are closing in and likely to be focusing on the player who is "cut out".

== D ==
Dead
The ball is considered dead if it goes out of play beyond the dead ball line.
Dead ball line
A boundary at each end of the playing field. The dead ball line is out of play.
Differential penalty
A penalty that may not be kicked for goal by the team to which it is awarded. Awarded when technical rule breaches (not foul play or obscene language) are committed during a scrum. Can be given to any player. In 2023, the RFL made penalties for scrum offences non-differential.
Dominant tackle
A referee may call "Dominant" as a player is tackled to indicate the dominance of the defender over the attacking player in possession during the contact between them at the tackle. A dominant tackle is when the defender makes contact and drives the attacker back in one movement. The dominant-tackle call rewards good technique and allows the defender extra time before the attacker must be released to play-the-ball.
Don't Argue
A hand-off in which the defender is floored and the attacker continues their run.
Double movement
An illegal movement in an attempt to score a try. An attacking player whose momentum does not allow the ball to reach the try-line or in-goal after their ball-carrying arm touches the ground may not reach out to score if a defender is in contact with them (a double movement).
Downward pressure
One of the several criteria which need to be met for a try to be awarded by the referee.
Drop goal
A drop goal is scored when a player kicks the ball from hand through the opposition's goal, but the ball must touch the ground between being dropped and kicked. It is worth one point. The team awarded a free kick cannot score a dropped goal until the ball next becomes dead, or an opponent has played or touched it, or has tackled the ball carrier.
Drop kick
When a player kicks the ball from a hand and the ball touches the ground between being dropped and kicked. If a drop kick goes through a goal, it is a drop goal.
Drop-out
Drop-out may refer to the following ways of bringing the ball back into play:
1. Goal line drop-out from the goal line.
2. A drop-out from the 20 metre line.
Dummy pass
An offensive ruse where the ball carrier moves as if to pass the ball to a team-mate, but continues to run with the ball; the objective is to trick defenders into marking the would-be pass receiver, creating a gap for the ball carrier.
Sometimes referred to as a "show and go".
Dummy runner
A player on the attacking team runs towards the opposition as if running onto a pass, but the ball is passed to another player, carried by the ball carrier or kicked forwards. Like a dummy pass, it draws defenders away from the ball and creates space for the attacking team. Also known as a "decoy runner".
Dump tackle
The tackler wraps his arms around the ball carrier's thighs and lifts him a short distance in the air before forcibly driving him to the ground. The tackler must go to ground with the ball carrier for the tackle to be legal. This technique is useful to stop an opponent in their tracks. A dump tackle which drops the ball carrier on their head or neck is known as a spear tackle, drawing a penalty and possible caution.

== E ==
Elbows and knees
The ball carrier, trying to get a quick play of the ball, aims to land on their "elbows and knees" (and can stand up faster).
Engage
1. An attacking player engages, or attracts, a defender (or defenders) to manipulate their defensive position for the advantage of the attacking team.
2. Markers are required to engage at the play-the-ball at an appropriate distance.

== F ==
Face ball
See cut out pass.
Facial
A defending player in contact with the ball-carrier during or after a tackle aggressively and illegally touching the face of the ball-carrier with their hand or forearm. Motivations may be wanting to provoke a reaction from the ball-carrier to gain a penalty, attempting to establish dominance over an opponent, or frustration.
Falcon
The ball contacts a person's head, almost always unintentionally.
Feed
See Loose head and feed.
Feeding the scrum
To roll the ball into the scrum.: The ball should enter the scrum via the tunnel formed by the front-row forwards of the two teams, with both teams able to strike for the ball, but players can roll the ball into their team's side of the scrum; this reduces the chances of the other team gaining possession of the ball.
Fend
Fending is the ball-carrier repelling a tackler with his arm, also known as a hand off. The ball carrier's arm must be straight before contact is made; a shove, or "straight-arm smash" (where the arm is extended immediately before, or on, contact) is considered dangerous play.
Field goal
1. (abolished in 1950) A goal scored by kicking a loose ball over the crossbar and between the posts.
2. After the 1920s in Australia and New Zealand, another name for a drop goal.
Field of play
"The area bounded by, but not including, the touch lines and goal lines".
First receiver
The first player to receive the ball off the ruck, from the dummy-half.
Five-eighth
See Stand-off.
Flat
A style of attacking play characterised by a lack of depth along the line of players; more of the attackers are near the defenders. Attackers take advantage of weaknesses created if defenders cannot organise themselves and allocate defenders where they are needed. Weaknesses include the risk of passes being intercepted and slowness in the attacking line.
Flat pass
This type of pass involves the player in possession of the ball and a teammate being level when the pass is received. The player about to receive the ball may be running past the ball-carrier, aiming for a gap in the defence and risking a forward pass.
Flick pass
A pass where the ball carrier sends the ball in the opposite direction of a standard pass, with the palm facing the direction of travel
Flop
An attempt by a player not involved in a tackle to delay the player in possession from getting to their feet quickly by falling on top of them, risking a penalty.
Forward pass
When the ball travels forward relative to the player passing it. If the referee considers a forward pass accidental, it results in a scrum for the opposing team. Deliberate forward passes, rarely identified by the referee, incur a penalty. If the ball is blown (or bounces) forward, it is not a forward pass.
Foul play
A non-technical breach of the rules, such as a high tackle.
Four-tackle rule (obsolete)
The four-tackle rule, in force between 1966 and 1972, ended the situation (a by-product of the 1906 introduction of play-the-ball) where teams could have a potentially unlimited number of tackles. The limit was raised from four to six tackles in 1972 to alleviate "disjointed" play.
Fullback
The title fullback (number 1) comes from their defensive position, where the player drops out of the defensive line to cover the rear from kicks and runners breaking the line. They are usually good ball catchers and clinical tacklers. In attack, the fullback will typically make runs into the attack or support a runner in anticipation of a pass out of the tackle.

== G ==
Gain line
See advantage line.
Ger 'em onside
"Ger 'em onside", or "gerrumonside", is a corruption of "get them onside" shouted to match officials in northern England. It is used primarily to express dissatisfaction with the distance from the play-the-ball that the referee has taken the defending players.
Go
In some jurisdictions, the referee will call "Go" to tell the defensive line that they may advance after an attacker has played the ball. The call, to reduce stoppages to deal with offside offences by defenders, may be used by the referee as part of the sequence "hold, go".
Grind
When a game is tight and both sides are trying to complete their sets and gain field position, a team will try to win the grind.
Goal
A goal is scored when a player kicks the ball through the plane bounded by the two uprights, above the crossbar. A conversion (or penalty goal) scores two points, and drop goals one.
Goal line
Two solid, straight white lines (one at each end) stretching across the pitch and passing through the goal posts, which are the boundary between the field of play and the in-goal. Since the goal line is part of the in-goal, attacking players can score tries by placing the ball with downward pressure onto the goal line itself. The base of the goal posts and post protectors are also part of the goal line. The goal line is also known as the "try line".
Goal line drop-out
Awarded when a defending player grounds the ball in their in-goal area, is tackled with the ball in their in-goal area, or plays the ball dead (or into touch) behind their goal line. The defending team must kick the ball from their goal line, and beneath the uprights, at least ten metres.
Golden point
The golden point, a sudden-death-overtime system, is sometimes used to resolve drawn rugby-league matches. Minor variations exist. In the National Rugby League, if the scores are level at the end of 80 minutes, five minutes are played, the teams swap ends with no break, and five more minutes are played. Any score (try, penalty goal, or field goal) in this 10-minute period secures a win for the scoring team, and the game ends.
Goose step
A change in running style from a sprint to high kicking to slow down a defender, resuming a sprint when the defender slows down.
Graded
In Australian rugby league, to mean a player progressing through junior representative age-level competitions through to open-age squads. Historically a player would be graded into age-level competitions, then progressing through to reserve/"second" grade (modern equivalents being NSW Cup and Queensland Cup) then through to "first grade" (now the NRL). Often used as an equivalent of "making the final squad" for the season. In youth competitions where players are usually aged 13-years-old and lower, teams can be grading and re-graded to ensure that squads of equal ability are playing in a competition against one another. Frequent close games improve players skills and resilience, keeps everyone involved in the team motivated and provides the best competitive experience, which aims to retain players in future seasons.
Grapple tackle
A controversial tackling technique in which the tackler attempts to impede the ball carrier by applying a choke hold. Although players can be penalised, it is difficult to enforce.
Great Split
See 1895 Schism.
Grounding
Placing the ball down correctly over the try line to score a try. Whether a try was properly grounded is often key to a referee's decision to award a try.
Grub
A player considered "dirty", by fans or other players.
Grubber kick
A kick which makes the ball roll and tumble across the ground, producing irregular bounces which make it difficult for the defending team to pick it up without causing a knock-on. It gives the ball high and low bounces, and sometimes the ball sits up in a perfect catching position.

== H ==
Haka
The haka is a traditional Māori dance performed by the Kiwis, the international rugby league team of New Zealand, before international matches as a challenge to the opposing team. The term is often used more broadly (and often inaccurately) to refer to any war dance before a match, such as Samoa's Siva Tau.
Halfback
See Scrum-half.
Halfbacks
See Halves.
Half break
When a ball-carrier can briefly get through the defensive line, but is tackled before they can make a clean break.
Halves
The halves, also known as halfbacks and sometimes inside backs, are the scrum-half (or halfback) and stand-off (or five-eighth) positions. In 19th-century rugby football, they were positioned at the midpoint between the forwards and the three fullbacks used at the time. Originally known as halfway backs.
Hand-off
See Fend.
Handover
"The surrendering of the ball to the opposition after a team has been tackled the statutory number of successive times." After the sixth tackle, the handover occurs. If the team in possession accidentally knocks on (or passes forward) after the fifth tackle, a handover occurs instead of a scrum; a handover also occurs if a team kicks the ball into touch on the full after the fifth tackle. Before 1983, at the end of a set of tackles a scrum was formed with loose head and feed to the defending team.
Head and feed
Short for loose head and feed.
Head coach
Head injury assessment
A medical protocol after any incident where concussion is suspected. Any player receiving a suspected concussion during a game is immediately removed from play and must undertake a head injury assessment (HIA). If the HIA is passed, the player may return to the game. Failure of an HIA rules the player out of the rest of the game, and they must follow the gradual-return-to-play process.
Held
The referee calls "held" to declare a tackle completed if the ball-carrier is held stationary by defenders.
HIA
See Head injury assessment.
High ball
See Up and under.
High kick
See Up and under.
High shot
Another term for high tackle.
High tackle
A high tackle (or head-high tackle) is when the tackler grasps the ball carrier above the shoulders, most commonly around the neck or at the line of the chin and jaw. Executed violently or at speed, a high tackle is potentially lethal and a cause for penalties and yellow (or red) cards.
Hit-up
Australasian term for crash ball.
Hold
In some jurisdictions, the referee will tell the defensive line that it is too soon to advance on attackers at the play-the-ball by calling "Hold!". It may be used by the referee as part of the sequence "Move, hold, go".
Hooker
A hooker (numbered 9) is most likely to play the role of dummy-half. In defence, the hooker usually defends in the middle of the line against the opposition's props and second-rowers. They are responsible for organising the defence in the middle of the field. In attack as dummy-half, the player is responsible for starting the play from every play-the-ball by passing the ball or running from dummy-half. Hookers must pass well, and traditionally "hooked" the ball in a scrum.
Hospital pass
A hospital pass is usually made by the ball-carrier in an attempt to keep from being caught with the ball and tackled. The pass is often made under pressure, without considering the situation of the receiver. The player catching the ball is often stationary and in the path of a defender, presenting an easy target for a hard-impact tackle.

== I ==
In and out
A running arc made by an attacking player. Often attempted by fast attackers when the main line of defenders has been breached and they are left with one player to beat. The ball-carrier arcs their run further infield, attempting to create indecision in the defender before turning towards the corner and attempting to reach the goal line first to score a try.
In-goal
The in-goal or "in-goal area" is the scoring area extending 6-11 metres (6.6-12 yards) from each goal line to each dead ball line.
Inside backs
See Halves.
Interception
A pass to a member of the same team is caught by a member of the opposing team.
Interchange
Each team may make a maximum of 12 interchanges from the 13 starting players and four substitutes. A player sent from the field by the referee because they are bleeding may be replaced, but the replacement will count as an interchange. Props are the most commonly interchanged players, due to their frequent physical confrontations with opponents. The number of interchanges allowed may differ in local competitions.

== K ==
Kick-in (obsolete)
See Punt-out.
Kick-off
A coin is tossed, and the winning captain chooses which direction his team shall play or takes the kick that starts the game. Both halves of the match are started with a kick off a tee from the centre-point of the halfway line. The kick must cross the opposition's 10-metre line, unless played by a member of the receiving team. The opposition are not allowed to encroach beyond the 10-metre line until the ball is kicked. If the ball does not travel 10 metres, goes straight into touch, or goes over the dead ball line at the end of the pitch, the opposing team receives a penalty at the centre. After a score, the game is restarted from the same place under the same restrictions and the conceding team drop-kicks the ball to the scoring team.
Knock-on
Also known as a knock-forward, a knock-on is committed when in an attempt to play at the ball a player knocks the ball towards their opponents' dead ball line with their hands or arms and it touches the ground or an opposing player. The ball may be knocked back. A knock-on results in a scrum with the put-in to the opposition, except when a knock-on is committed by a player whose team is on their last tackle (when the result is a handover) or if the opposing team gains possession of the ball (which results begins their set of tackles with a zero tackle.

== L ==
Late tackle
A late tackle is made on a player who has already passed, or kicked away, the ball. Since it is illegal to tackle a player who does not have the ball, late tackles are penalty offences (referees allow a short margin of error when the tackler was already committed to the tackle) and may result in yellow or red cards. If a late tackle occurs after a kick and a penalty is awarded, the non-offending team may take the penalty where the ball landed.
Lay a platform
When Team A's forward pack are on top of team B's pack, and help give field position and time to the halves.
Leagues club
In Australia, a venue in which hospitality and gaming are operated for the benefit of a rugby league club, which they control by appointing board members. Leagues clubs have provided funds to finance the sporting club, often from poker-machine profits. In the 2000s, political attacks on corporate governance led to tax changes which lessened profitability and forced clubs to broaden their revenue streams.
Limited tackles
Limited tackles were introduced in 1966, initially with a four-tackle rule. After using their tackles, the team in possession must surrender the ball to their opponents. The limit remained at four until an increase to six tackles in 1972 created the six-tackle rule.
Line-out (obsolete)
The line-out was a method used to re-start play after the ball had gone into touch. Players from each team would stand in a line perpendicular to the touch line and attempt to catch the ball as it was thrown into the field of play. In 1897 the line-out was abolished and replaced with the punt-out.
Line speed
The speed of the defensive team in rushing forwards to meet the ball carrier from the tackle. Since the defensive side must retreat 10 metres after each tackle, a key aspect of defence is how much of this 10 metres they can recover before contact with the ball carrier.
Loose carry
When a referee rules that an attacking player did not sufficiently protect their possession of the ball as they came into contact with defenders. This allows a referee to decide if they think the attacking player committed a knock-on or whether the defenders stripped the ball with intent.
Loose forward
The loose forward (numbered 13) is the only forward in the third (last) row of the scrum. They are usually one of the fittest players on the field, covering the entire field on offense and defence. Typically, they are big ball-runners who can occasionally slot in as a passing link or kick option; it is not uncommon for loose forwards to have the skills of a five eighth, and to play a similar role on the team.
Loose head and feed
A team awarded a scrum due to a mistake by the opposing team is given the loose head and feed of that scrum. The "loose head" means that the prop closest to the player who feeds the scrum (puts the ball in) will be a teammate. In the era of fully-contested scrums, the loose head prop could influence the outcome of a scrum by protecting the ball or moving the scrum. Before 1983, a scrum was formed at the end of a set of tackles; this was changed that year to a handover of possession.

== M ==
McIntyre system
The McIntyre system (or systems; there have been five) is a play-off system that gives an advantage to teams, or competitors, qualifying higher.
Mark
The mark is the place on the field where the referee awards a penalty kick, free kick or scrum.
Marker
The defending team may position up to two players, known as "marker(s)" at the play-the-ball opposite the tackled player and the dummy-half of the attacking team.
Milking
An attacking player, in the ruck, falls to the ground when touched by a defender to incur a penalty. If the referee is not conned, he may shout "Milking!"
Minor premiership
In several sports, a minor premiership is an (often unofficial) award given to a team which finishes first overall in the standings after the regular season before the play-offs.
Momentum rule
The momentum rule is related to the law governing forward passes. Whether a ball has been illegally passed forward is judged by its movement relative to the player passing it. This method is used because most passes involve the ball moving forward relative to the ground as the players carrying it move towards their opponents' goal line.
Move
1. Refers to a passage of play. Often used to refer to pre-planned actions.
2. The referee will call "Move!" to order defending players to allow a tackled player to their feet.
Mulligrubber
The mulligrubber is a style of kicking. A mulligrubber is directed towards the ground and forced to bounce. Often used in situations where either the ball needs to be placed in a specific position (on the try line) or to intentionally stop the opponent from catching the ball on the full.

== O ==
Obstruction
Impeding any opponent who does not have the ball by tackling or blocking them. A referee will penalise a player obstructing an opponent. A player is not required to move out of the path of another to prevent an obstruction. If two players from opposing teams are running in the same direction towards a loose ball, they are permitted to shoulder charge their opponent.
Offload
When a player holding the ball is tackled, but passes the ball to a teammate before the tackle is completed. (A tackle is not considered complete until the arm carrying the ball touches the ground while the player is still held by the tackler; the player's forward momentum stops while being held by the tackler, or the referee calls "held".) If a player passes the ball legally during a tackle (offloads the ball), it does not count as a tackle in his team's set of six and play continues. Sonny Bill Williams is known for his offloading ability.
Offside
A player is considered temporarily out of play if they are offside, and may be penalised if they join the game inappropriately. A player is offside when they are forward of the relevant offside line (between it and the opposing team's dead ball line). In a match, most players will be offside several times but are only subject to penalty if they do not act to attempt to become onside (which generally means retreat downfield) or attempt to interfere with play. In open play, only the ball carrier's team (or the team that last carried or deliberately touched the ball) is bound by offside; the offside line, for them, is the ball. Every player who passes the ball backwards is offside, and must attempt to retire.
One-on-one tackle
A colloquial phrase used to refer to a phase of play in rugby league in which a single defender attempts to tackle the ball carrier.
One-out rugby
When the dummy half passes to the first receiver who will take the ball into collision to gain metres. No passing beyond the initial play of the ball and pass from dummy half occurs.
Onside
A player is onside when they are behind the relevant offside line for a particular phase of play. Players who are onside take an active part in playing the game. Previously-offside players may be "put onside" by other players; in a kick ahead in open play, players on the kicker's team in front of the kick are offside but may be put onside by the kicker or any other team member who was onside at the time of the kick running up the pitch past them). So players can be confident that they are onside and can take an active part in the game, the referee may shout "Onside" or "All onside".
On the full
If the ball is kicked into touch without first bouncing inside the field of play, it is known as the ball being kicked into touch on the full. A player catching the ball after a kick, before it bounces, has caught it on the full.
Openside
The broad side of the pitch in relation to a scrum or play-the-ball.
Optional kick
Used to bring the ball back into play. The team taking the kick may kick the ball in any way and in any direction. Except for a penalty kick, an optional kick is taken from the centre of the 20-metre line if the attacking team are the last to touch the ball before it goes over the dead ball or touch in-goal line. An optional kick is awarded if an "attacking player infringes in the in-goal area" or a defending player catches a kick in general play on the full in their in-goal.
Outside backs
See Threequarters.

== P ==
Pack
The group of forwards of a team.
Pack down
To form a scrum.
Parramatta Wall
A set-piece move with a number of variations in which attacking players stand side-by-side, facing their own goal line, while they and their teammates attempt to obscure the ball and confuse the opposing defence. Named after the Parramatta Eels.
Pass
To transfer a ball to a teammate by throwing it. Passes must not travel forward from the hands of the passer. Variations include the flat, direct spin pass; the short, close-quarters pop pass; and the floated pass (a long pass which an advancing player can run onto at pace).
Penalty
Penalties are awarded for serious infringements like dangerous play, offside and handling the ball on the ground.
Penalty kick
If a side incurs a penalty, the opposition may take a place kick at goal from where the penalty occurred. If successful, it is worth two points.
Penalty try
A penalty try is awarded if the referee believes a team illegally prevented a probable try from being scored. Penalty tries are awarded under the posts, regardless of where the offence took place.
Place kick
The place kick, a kicking style commonly used when kicking for goal, typically involves placing the ball on the ground. To keep the ball in position, a mound of sand or a plastic tee is sometimes used.
Placer
Placers are used to hold the ball in-place for a kicker during a place kick attempt. Placers are usually only used in the modern game if weather conditions are causing the ball to move from the position it has been set in by the kicker. In the early years of the game, when defenders could charge the ball as soon as it touched the ground, a placer was permitted to be used to place the ball on the ground at the last moment.
Play-the-ball
The play-the-ball is used to restart play in various instances during a game, but most commonly immediately following a tackle.
Powerplay
Powerplay is running the ball on the fifth tackle, instead of kicking it.
Professional foul
A deliberate act of foul play, usually to prevent an opponent scoring.
Prop
The props (numbered 8 and 10) are normally the largest players on the field, typically over 15 stone (100 kg) in an open or senior game, and are positioned in the centre of the line. The prop dissuades the opposition from attacking the centre of the defensive line and, in attack, gives the team momentum by aggressively taking the ball up to the defence.
Punt-out (obsolete)
Between 1897 and 1902, the punt-out (also called a kick-in) was an option to restart play after the ball went into touch; the other option was a scrum. It replaced the line-out in 1897, and was replaced by a scrum on the 10 yard line in 1902. A punt-out was taken from the touch-line by a player who could kick the ball back into play in any direction.
Put in
See Feeding the scrum.

== R ==
Red zone
The area between each goal line and their respective 20-metre lines (their own quarter).
Ref's call
The decision to award a possible try, referred to the video referee for examination, may be passed back to the referee on the pitch to make the decision if the video is inconclusive. Not used in the Northern Hemisphere.
Rooks
Someone who is knowledgeable about rugby league.
Round the corner kicking
A style of kicking used for kicking penalties and converting tries.
Ruck
Between the player playing-the-ball and the defending marker. The ruck exists between a completed tackle being and completion of the subsequent play-the-ball. The ball cannot be interfered with by the marker whilst it is in the ruck, or a penalty will be issued against that player's team. A penalty is also issued against the attacking team if the player responsible for playing-the-ball does not play it correctly.
Ruck infringement
When a defending player interferes in the ruck. Common interferences include: markers not being square, markers breaking early from the ruck, holding in the tackle for too long and the defending team being inside 10 metres.

== S ==
Scramble
The defence after a break, with players retreating to attempt a cover tackle or get back onside if the attacker has been tackled.
Second man play
A move involving a decoy runner.
Second year syndrome
Also called "second-season syndrome", it affects players who struggle in their second season after a successful first. A commonly-cited cause is failure to develop playing ability in an era of video analysis by rival teams.
Seven-tackle set
Awarded to a team when the opposition kick the ball dead in goal. The opposition get the ball back and start their set on the 20-metre line while gaining an extra tackle (they have seven tackles, instead of the standard six).
Schism

Splits in rugby football which led to the development of rugby league:

1. In 1895, the schism in England (also known as the Great Split) occurred when the Northern Rugby Football Union was formed by clubs breaking away from the rugby-union establishment after a meeting at the George Hotel, Huddersfield.
2. In 1907, a group of New Zealand rugby footballers organised in secret and began a tour of Australia and Great Britain, risking a ban from the New Zealand Rugby Union. The tour played a large role in establishing rugby league in Australia and New Zealand, and gave birth to international rugby league. The first game of rugby league played on New Zealand soil was an exhibition by the tourists on their return in 1908.
3. In 1907, the New South Wales Rugby Football League was formed in a meeting at Bateman's Crystal Hotel in Sydney five days before they were due to receive the touring New Zealanders. Players were recruited immediately, resulting in a schism of rugby football in Australia.
Scissors move
An attempt to breach the opposing defence. The attacking player, carrying the ball, will veer left or right (often drawing the defender covering them and sometimes engaging another defender by running towards them). A teammate of the ball carrier will run across and forward in the other direction just behind the ball carrier, receiving a pass as they cross and running towards the disruption of the defence. Also known as a switch.
Scrum
Scrum-half
The scrum half, or half back (numbered 7), directs the game and is usually one of the smaller players. The scrum half and the stand off form a team's creative unit. They control the attack, deciding with their passes how the team attacks and if, when and where the ball is kicked. This player is responsible for ensuring that the other players are in the right position for an attacking move.
Second effort
An attempt by a defending player who has tackled an attacker to delay the play-the-ball by interfering with the tackled player's attempt to stand up. Subject to a penalty.
Second row
The second row forwards (numbered 11 and 12). The modern second row is similar to a centre and is expected to be faster, have more skills than the prop and play amongst the three-quarters, providing strength when the ball is passed to the wings. Good second-rowers combine the skills and responsibilities of props and centres.
See you later
A phrase sometimes used in commentary to refer to a hand-off or fend.
Shape
Refers to the positioning of players. Most often used when talking about the positioning of attacking players when they are supporting the ball-carrier after a break. "Good shape" usually means that the support players have positioned themselves on either side of the player running with the ball to offer offensive passing options.
Short side
The side of the play-the-ball with the shorter distance to the touch line. Also known as the blind or blindside.
Shot
A term used to praise a big hit on an opposing player. "Shot" is used by approvingly commentators for a significant tackle.
Shoulder charge
A physical challenge formerly used by a defending player on the player with the ball, making contact without the arms. Banned in 2013, a shoulder charge results in a penalty.
Show and go
The player in possession attacks the defensive line with a stance, holding the ball in front of them to create the impression that a pass to a teammate is likely (the show). With indecision created in the defence, the ball carrier will sprint for a weak point in the defensive line (the go).
Sidestep
An attempt by the ball-carrier to evade defenders. By stepping to the side, the attacking player tests defenders' reactions to gain time (and space) to advance the ball.
Sin bin
Where a player must remain for a minimum of ten minutes. In high-level games, the sin bin is monitored by the fourth official.
Six again
Attacking team is awarded an extra set of six tackles by the referee due to a ruck infringement by the defending team.
Six-tackle rule
The six-tackle rule was introduced in 1972, modifying the rules on limited tackles to alleviate the "disjointed" play of the four-tackle rule.
Sliding defence
The sliding defence requires that gaps are left at either edge of the field at the end of the defensive line, squeezing more players around the area of play. This allows the line to be at its strongest around the position of play, leaving the attacking side less opportunity to run through the line. If the attacking side move the ball towards one edge of the field to go around the defensive line, the entire defensive line will move in that direction.
Spear tackle
A dangerous tackle in which a player is picked up by the tackler and turned upside down. The tackler then drops the player on the ground, often head-, neck- or shoulder-first. Spear tackles have caused spinal damage, dislocations and broken bones in the shoulder or neck, and death, and can result in lengthy playing bans.
Stand-off
The stand off, or "five-eighth" (numbered 6), is often a playmaker and likely to be a tactical kicker. The stand-off has a high level of interaction with the other playmaker positions (scrum-half, loose forward and hooker), and is usually involved in passing.
State of Origin
Representative series in which players are selected for the states or territories where they first played or played most of their junior football. The concept mirrors international-representative rules in other sports. The most prominent rugby league state of origin is New South Wales versus Queensland in Australia.
Steeden
An Australian sporting-goods manufacturer best known for producing rugby league footballs. The name has been used as a noun to describe the ball itself.
Stiff-arm fend
Fending is the action by the ball carrier of repelling a tackler with their arm. For the action to be legal, the ball carrier's arm must be straight before contact is made; a shove, or "straight-arm smash" (where the arm is extended immediately before, or on contact), is considered dangerous play.
Strike
# Use of the foot to attempt to gain possession of the ball in the scrum.
1. To hit an opponent with a fist, considered misconduct under Section 15, Law 1 (a).
2. (Obsolete) Markers, in the past, were allowed to strike for possession of the ball when at the play-the-ball.
Strip the ball
The act of defending players removing the ball from the possession of the attacking player. This is allowed if there is only one defender in contact with the attacker (see one-on-one tackle).
Substitute
In addition to the 13 players on the playing field, each team selects up to four substitutes to be available as replacements in interchanges during the game.
Summer era
"Summer era" and "Super League era" are synonymous in British rugby league for the time since the 1996 change to the top level of competition in the United Kingdom from the Rugby Football League Championship, which was played on a schedule which included November, December and January, to Super League (played in the summer).
Summer rugby
Rugby league in the Northern Hemisphere, led by Britain, has gravitated towards playing in the summer rather than in the traditional winter season. The initial change was made by the top level of competition in the United Kingdom, when Super League I began in 1996 and played through the summer. The other professional tiers, amateur competitions such as the Rugby League Conference, and some junior leagues have changed (or been formed) to play in summer. Benefits have included fewer postponed matches and greater enjoyment by players and spectators.
Support
Players in support put themselves in a position to assist a teammate. Effective support play is considered vital to take advantage of opportunities to make ground towards the opponents' end of the field or to score.
Surrender tackle
A referee may call "Surrender!" as a player is tackled to indicate that they have judged the player in possession to have allowed themselves to be tackled by diving to the ground or by collapsing in the tackle. The referee will allow the defending team more time to release the tackled player. The intention of the player in possession is to gain an unfair advantage by having a speedy play-the-ball and resumption of play so their team can press their advantage by reducing the amount of time available for the defending team to organise their defence. The player in possession aims to allow the tackle to be completed on their own terms (for example, their body position), letting them more easily regain their feet.
Swinging arm
Defending players may be penalised by the referee if they are caught using a swinging arm against the ball-carrier in the tackle.

== T ==
Tackle

The player in possession may be tackled by players on the opposing team. It is not permitted to tackle or obstruct a player not in possession of the ball. A tackle is completed when the player in possession of the ball:

1. Is held by a defending player while the ball or ball-carrying arm are in contact with the ground.
2. Is held by a defending player in such a way that they cannot make "further progress" and "cannot part with the ball".
3. While being held by a defending player, makes it clear that they have "succumbed to the tackle and wish to be released in order to play the ball".
Take the two
When the attacking side is given a penalty, in close contests commentators and fans might say "take the two", indicating that the attacking side should kick at goal for two points instead of risking going for a try.
Tap kick
A type of kick used for penalties or free kicks to meet the regulation that the ball must be kicked a visible distance before a player may pass or run with it. In a tap kick, the player momentarily releases the ball from his hands and taps it with his foot or lower leg and then quickly catches it again. The player will then generally try to run forward with the ball.
Tap tackle
Another term for Ankle tap.
Test match
International rugby league matches with full (test) status are called Test matches.
Threequarters
The threequarters, also known as "outside backs", consist of the wingers and centres. The term "threequarters" originated as the tactics and player formations of rugby football developed in the 1880s. The players positioned between the halves and the fullback were known as the quarters; during the years in which it was usual for there to be three players positioned here, they were known as the three quarters. Later, the addition of a fourth player to the quarters became the norm. As the formations developed, an additional player was placed between the halfback and the quarters. Due to a semantic change for three quarters to mean six-eighths, with halfback being four-eighths, the position came to be known as the five-eighth.
Touch
Touch is the area outside two touch-lines which define the sides of the playing area. Since the touch-lines are not part of the playing area, they are usually included as part of touch.
Touch in-goal
The part of the touch line inside the in-goal area. If a team causes the ball to go into touch in-goal in their in-goal area, they must perform a goal line drop-out. If a team causes the ball to go into touch in-goal in the opposing team's in-goal, the opposing team will be given an optional kick on the 20-metre line.
Touch judge
An official who monitors the touch-line and raises a flag if the ball (or player carrying it) goes into touch. Touch judges also stand behind the posts to confirm that a goal has been scored after a penalty kick or conversion of a try.
Try
The primary method of scoring, a try is worth four points. It is scored when a player places the ball on the ground with downward pressure in the in-goal area between (and including) the goal-line and up to, but not including, the dead ball line of the opposition's half. Since the goal posts and post protectors are also part of the goal-line, touching the ball down against the base of these is also a try. If a defending player grounds the ball in his in-goal area, a goal line drop-out is awarded.
Try-line
Otherwise known as the goal line, so called because a player has to cross this line to score a try.
Turnover
Another term for handover.

== U ==
Umbrella defence
The umbrella defence (or "up and in defence") requires that players do not spread across the entire field. The defensive line is particularly vulnerable on the edges around the wings, so the best defensive measure is a preventive measure. The aim is to prevent the attacking team from going to the wings or to disrupt passes towards the edge of the field. This requires that defensive players (wingers or centres) on the edge of the defensive line move up faster than those in the middle of the line.
Up and in defence
See Umbrella defence.
Up and under
An up and under, also known as a "bomb", is a high, short punt onto (or behind) the defending team. The name "up and under" describes the ball going up into the air while the attacking players rush underneath it towards where it is expected to land.
Up the jumper
A style of play intended to reduce the chance of attacking players committing errors. This is usually accomplished by limiting passes in number and risk. Often advocated for use by a team in the lead late in the match.

== V ==
Voluntary tackle
The attacking player in possession is not allowed to "deliberately and unnecessarily" allow themselves to be tackled by falling to the ground when not held by a defender; this includes when a player falls on a loose ball. The player must attempt to regain their feet and continue. Section 11, Law 4 of the Laws of the Game rules the voluntary tackle illegal.

== W ==
Wing
The wings, or "wing three quarters" (numbered 2 and 5) are normally the fastest players on a team and play on the far-left and -right fringes of the field (the wings). Their main task is to receive passes and score tries. The wingers also drop back on the last tackle to cover the left and right sides of the field for kicks, while the fullback covers the middle.

== Z ==
Zam-buk (obsolete)
Zam-Buk, or zambuk, was a skin dressing sold by chemists and used by ambulance personnel and first-aiders on injured players at rugby league matches since the 1900s. In Australia and New Zealand the term was soon being used to refer to the ambulance-men and first aiders themselves. The term fell into disuse in the 1970s, as ambulance personnel and first-aiders were replaced by club trainers and others.
