= Rugby league playing field =

Standard dimensions and markings of a rugby league field. Not all playing fields are the same size.

The rugby league playing field, also referred to as a pitch or paddock, is the playing surface for the sport of rugby league football and is surfaced exclusively with grass.

The dimensions and markings of a full-sized playing area are defined in Section 1 of the Laws of the Game. These Laws are the agreed upon and maintained by the Rugby League International Federation. The playing field is defined as "the area bounded by, but not including, the touch lines and dead ball lines" by Section 2. If the ball or any player in possession of it makes contact with the touch lines or dead ball lines or the ground beyond them it is deemed to be out of play.

The rugby league field also has markings to denote where restarts, such as scrums, should be placed.

== Dimensions ==
A rugby league pitch (or field) is 68 m (74 yards) wide and 112–122 m (122–133 yards) long. The try lines (or goal lines) stand 100 m (110 yards) apart. On each one is a goal post that is 5.5 m (6 yards) wide and at least 16 m (17 yards) high, with a crossbar set 3 m (3.3 yards) above the ground. The distance from try line to dead-ball line is 6–11 m (7–12 yards).

The field of play is a fixed size – 100 m (110 yards) long and 68 m (74 yards) wide and does not include the line markings, meaning all touchlines and dead ball lines are considered out of play.

== Field ==
Near each end of the field is a goal line, or try-line; they are 100 m (110 yards) apart. A scoring area called the in-goal area extends 6–11 m (7–12 yards) from each try-line to each dead ball line.

Most play will occur within the field of play, this "is the area bounded by, but not including, the touch lines and goal lines".

When the team in possession of the ball is attempting to score a try, the goal line is included in the in-goal area, grounding the ball correctly on either is a try.

When the team in possession is attempting to return the ball to the field of play from their own in-goal area the goal line is part of the field of play. A team caught with the ball in their own in-goal must restart play with a drop kick of the ball from between their posts, this usually results in the other team gaining possession.

Between the goal lines, broken lines run parallel to each touch line at 10 and 20 m (11 and 22 yards) from touch. Free kicks are taken 10 m (11 yards) in from the point where the ball entered touch after being kicked out to gain ground from a penalty. If a scrum is required to restart play and the event that caused it occurred "within 20 metres of a touch line or ten metres of a goal line the scrum shall be brought in twenty metres from the touch line and ten metres from the goal line".

=== Markings ===
Lines with distance markers transverse the field every 10 m (11 yards) perpendicular to the touch lines. The distances ascend from each goal line towards the halfway line, which is marked "50" (similar to a typical American football field). These lines, as well as the goal lines, dead ball lines and touch lines are 15 cm (6 inches) wide and white in colour, the only exception being the 40-metre (44-yard) lines, which are usually coloured red to distinguish them for the determination of 40–20 kicks in play.

The broken lines 10 metres (11 yards) and 20 metres (22 yards) in from the touch lines are 10 cm (4 inches) wide and white in colour.

The distance markers on the playing field are white with a red outline. These numbers are 2 m (6.6 feet).

=== Objects ===
On each goal line are two goal posts 5.5 m (18 feet) apart connected by a cross bar 3 m (9.8 feet) from the ground. Each goal post is 16 m (52 feet) in height (however they can be built higher) and for the purpose of judging a goal are considered to extend upwards indefinitely. The posts and crossbar form an "H" shape. Goal posts supported by only one post below the crossbar are permissible. The bottom 2 m (6.6 feet) of a goal post is recommended to be padded to protect players from injury. At professional level, these pads are usually cuboids that encase each post.

A corner post is placed at the points where each touch line meets each goal line. The post must consist of non-rigid material and should be at least 1.3 m (4.3 feet) in height. The corner posts are in touch in-goal, that is to say they act in the same way as sidelines and the ball-carrier touching them immediately halts play.

=== Rule variation ===
During the 2010 NRL season, a rule change to the playing field was implemented so that if a player in possession of the ball made contact with the corner post that player would no longer be considered to be touch in-goal. Proponents of the move argued a series a possible future scenarios made this preventative measure necessary, with ARL chief executive Geoff Carr stating, "no one has thought of the possibility of using the corner post as a weapon to defuse a try and we want to stop it before they do". One scenario was that a defending player might manipulate the corner post to put an attacker out of play. Another concern cited was that the corner post might be made to make contact with a rolling ball to ensure the defending team gains possession with a 20-metre restart. Corner posts, which sometimes lean to one side, have no upper height limit set and this led to a fear that corner posts might become "long rubber snakes, biting attackers and sending them into touch", in the words of Roy Masters. Other laws concerning the corner posts remained unchanged. A ball that makes contact with the corner post while not in the possession of a player will be deemed to be touch in-goal as before. There was no attempt to remove the corner posts from the playing field as they are used to promote sponsors and are also a useful aid for players to judge their kicks. The change was agreed by the NRL Board and approved by the RLIF as an experimental rule. Implementation occurred mid-season following feedback from clubs.

== Scoring ==
- A try can be scored by grounding the ball on the try-line or in the in-goal area between it and the dead ball line.
- A goal (conversion, penalty or drop goal) is scored when the ball travels above the crossbar and between the posts of the goal which is situated in the middle of the try-line.
- A penalty try is awarded if a player is fouled in the act of scoring a try but doesn't ground the ball. The conversion is taken from in front of the goal posts.
- An 8-point try is awarded if a player is fouled in the act of scoring a try but still grounds the ball. The conversion kicks are from where the try is scored and in front of the goal posts

== See also ==
- Laws of rugby league
