= Laws of rugby league =

In rugby league football, the Laws of the Game are the rules governing how the sport is played. The Laws are the responsibility of the Rugby League International Federation, and cover the play, officiating, equipment and procedures of the game.

The Laws have undergone significant changes since pioneers of the sport broke away from the Rugby football establishment in 1895. The sport has been described as a "constantly evolving animal, particularly with professional coaches, [with which] the rules have to keep pace".

== Laws ==
The current Laws of the Game and Notes on the Laws are set out in 17 sections:

- Section 1: Playing Field
- Section 2: Glossary
- Section 3: Ball
- Section 4: Player and Players' Equipment
- Section 5: Mode of Play
- Section 6: Scoring
- Section 7: Timekeeping
- Section 8: Kick-off and Drop-out
- Section 9: Touch and Touch in-Goal
- Section 10: Knock-on and Forward Pass
- Section 11: Tackle and Play-the-Ball
- Section 12: Scrum
- Section 13: Penalty Kick
- Section 14: Offside
- Section 15: Misconduct
- Section 16: Referee and Touch Judges
- Section 17: Referee's Signals

The current 17 sections, which include notes, are detailed in fewer than 50 pages and around 17,000 words. The Laws therefore have some flexibility to enable decisions to be made without the need to amend them. For example, Section 15, Law 1 (i) considers behaviour "in any way contrary to the true spirit of the game" to be misconduct. That law has been used to prevent chicken-wing tackling techniques, for example.

== Origins ==
=== Rugby football ===
The rules of football as played at Rugby School in the 19th century were decided regularly and informally by the pupils. For many years the rules were unwritten. In 1845 three pupils at the school, William Delafield Arnold, Walter Waddington Shirley and Frederick Leigh Hutchins were tasked with writing a codified set of rules by the then Head Schoolboy and football captain Isaac Gregory Smith. The three pupils submitted 37 rules which were approved on 28 August 1845. Another pupil, Charles Harcourt Chambers, illustrated the Rules.

The Rules played at the school continued to develop over time and as pupils left they took with them the game as they had played it. In 1871, the Rugby Football Union (RFU) was founded with the purpose of standardising the rules for the clubs playing the Rugby style of football in England. The RFU invited three former pupils, all lawyers, to write the standardised rules, and they titled their work as laws. In June of that year the first Laws of the Game were approved.

Unions were formed to govern the game in other countries but the English RFU continued to control the Laws until 1885. In 1884, there had been a dispute over the rules between the English and Scottish unions after a match between the two countries; this led to the formation of the International Rugby Football Board in 1886 with the intention of settling such disputes. The RFU refused to join and in 1887 the members of the new organisation, Ireland, Scotland and Wales, stated that no matches would be played against England until the RFU joined and accepted its rules. In 1890 the RFU joined and in 1892 a significant revision of the laws took place.

=== Rugby league ===
From 1895, the year of the schism in the game, the laws of rugby league were initially referred to as "Northern Union" rules, after the new governing body, and were a slight variation on the rules of rugby football as played at that time. What began as modifications to make the competition more entertaining to spectators continued until a distinct sport had emerged.

Initially the rules were decided by the Northern Rugby Football Union, today's Rugby Football League, the governing body for rugby league in the United Kingdom. As the sport spread to around the world, other rugby leagues were established, notably in Australia, France and New Zealand, a more international approach was adopted. In 1948, the International Rugby League Board (IRLB) was formed. Initially the RFL retained this responsibility for the Laws while it was seen how the new Board would develop. The IRLB was invested with responsibility for the Laws later.

During the Super League war, a dispute over media rights and the control of the game originating in Australia, the laws of rugby league were altered by the rival factions, the IRLB and its only remaining member, the Australian Rugby League, and the Super League International Board and its members.

Since 1998 when the different sides reunited, the Laws have been the responsibility of the Rugby League International Federation.

== History of changes to the Laws ==
The Northern Rugby Football Union inherited the existing laws of rugby football, as played until that time by its member clubs. The NRFU immediately made changes. In addition to the time before 1948 when an international governing body was established, members of the International Federation and its predecessors have had the authority to make significant changes to the Laws applied within their jurisdiction.

The following is an incomplete list of changes made to the laws of rugby league since the 1895 schism. Changes to the laws used for senior competitions within the jurisdictions of RLIF members with test nation status are included here.

Additional detail: Included are the flags or icons of the territory affected as well as the name of the governing body responsible and a link to the first season the change was implemented in senior competition (s) by that body. If a Law has since been changed, the Law's current status is indicated, and a link given to the year of the change in this article.

=== 1890s ===
1895

NRFU Implemented: 1895–96 Northern Rugby Football Union season.

- During the inaugural season of rugby league, the rules were changed to require the scrum-half to retire behind a scrum until the ball was out. The scrum-half would now be deemed offside if they moved past their team's forwards while the ball was in the opposing pack. When the game was introduced to Australia several years later, the change was noted by The Sydney Sportsman on 15 April 1908 to "make the game fast and open" as it allowed the side that wins the contest for the ball to mobilise their backs "without interference". Before this a scrum-half had been permitted to follow the ball as it progressed through the packed forwards of their opponents half of the scrum.

1896

NRFU Implemented: 1896–97 Northern Rugby Football Union season.

- If a team committed a deliberate knock-on a free kick would now be awarded to the opposing team. Previously a scrum would have been formed in such an event.
- The scrum-half feeding the ball into the scrum was required to do so from the same side of the scrum as the referee was positioned.

1897

NRFU Implemented: 1897–98 Northern Rugby Football Union season.

- The options presented to a team as a means to restart play after the ball had been kicked into touch were changed. The line-out was abolished and replace with the punt-out. The team would now be able to choose whether to have a scrum or a punt-out (also known as a "kick-in"), where previously the options had been to have a scrum or a line-out. A punt-out was taken from the touch-line by a player who could kick the ball back into play, in any direction.
- In order to promote the scoring of tries:
  - The value of a drop goal was reduced from four points to two points. Amended: NSWRFL, 1971.
  - The value of a penalty goal was reduced from three points to two points.
  - The value of a goal from mark was reduced from four points to two points. Abolished: NSWRFL, 1922.
  - The value of a field goal was reduced from four points to two points. Abolished: NSWRFL, 1922.

1899

NRFU Implemented: 1899–1900 Northern Rugby Football Union season.

- The location of the restart after a try had been scored, either a place-kick if the try had been converted or a drop-kick if the try-scoring team was unable to convert, was moved from the 25-yard (23 m) line of the non-scoring team to the halfway line.
- After a player had been tackled a loose scrum was now ordered formed to allow the ball to be brought back into play.

=== 1900s ===
1900

NRFU Implemented: 1900–01 Northern Rugby Football Union season.

- Defenders were banned from charging players attempting a place-kick at goal.
- The location at which a penalty was awarded against a defender that had obstructed a kicker after the ball had been kicked was changed from where the incident took place to where the ball had landed.

1901

NRFU Implemented: 1901–02 Northern Rugby Football Union season.

- Should a player go into touch while in possession of the ball play would now be restarted with a scrum rather than a punt-out. The punt-out was retained for those times when the ball was kicked into touch.
- The knocking-on rule was altered. While trying to catch the ball, a player would now be permitted to "juggle" it, i.e. the ball could be re-gathered if it had not been caught cleanly in the first attempt to take possession. Previously a "clean catch" had been required, except in instances when the ball moved backwards after touching the hands or arms, because a knock to the ball causing forward movement was classed a knock-on.
- Another change to the knock-on rule meant, provided that the ball did not touch the ground, play would continue uninterrupted if a player dropped the ball into the hands of a player on the opposing team.

1902

NRFU Implemented: 1902–03 Northern Rugby Football Union season.

- The punt-out, or kick-in, was abolished. In the event of the ball being kicked into touch, play would restart with a scrum 10 yards (9.1 m) infield.

1903

NRFU Implemented: 1903–04 Northern Rugby Football Union season.

- Kicking the ball into touch on the full, i.e. without the ball bouncing inside the field of play before going into touch, was no longer allowed for any kick except a penalty kick.

1904

NRFU Implemented: 1904–05 Northern Rugby Football Union season.

- A team could no longer position more than three players in the front row of a scrum. Previously there had been no restrictions on how many members of a team could join the front row.
- The knocking-on rule was adjusted so that in the event the non-offending team picked up the ball after their opponents had knocked-on, and even if it had touched the ground, play would continue.

1906

NRFU Implemented: 1906–07 Northern Rugby Football Union season.

- The play-the-ball rule was introduced. Previously after each tackle had been completed or a player had been "held" the rules mandated that a scrum be ordered by the referee. These scrums had taken up a significant portion of game time and it was felt that the ball was hidden from spectators too often as a result, diminishing the game's entertainment value. The play-the-ball restored the early rugby football principle that play does not carry on when the player is no longer standing, but that a tackle is complete when a player is "held" on the ground or while on their feet. The Yorkshire Post commented on 13 June 1906 that the proposals, "provided in effect for a return to the 'play the ball' rule". In New Zealand, a newspaper column in The Truth on 10 November 1906 while describing the sport to its readers wrote, "the most excellent rule, that was obliterated from the earlier laws of the Union has again been introduced, 'That a player, when collared, must put the ball into play'." Amended: NSWRFL, 1926; RFL, 1927.
- The number of players on each team was reduced from fifteen to thirteen.
- If a ball was kicked out of play on the full, a scrum back where it had been kicked from would now be formed.

1909

(Australia) NSWRFL Implemented: 1909 NSWRFL season.

- Teams were restricted from placing more than three players in the front row of a scrum; the other rows remained unrestricted. Amended: NSWRFL, 1931.

=== 1920s ===
1920

(Australia) NSWRFL Implemented: 1920 NSWRFL season.

- A scrum-half was now required to feed the ball into the scrum.

1922

(Australia) NSWRFL Implemented: 1922 NSWRFL season.

- The goal from mark after a fair catch was abolished.
- The 'field goal', which could be scored in open play by kicking a loose ball above the cross bar and between the posts, was abolished.

1926

(Australia) NSWRFL Implemented: 1926 NSWRFL season.

- The goal-line drop-out replaced drop-outs from the 25-yard (23 m) line after the ball was played dead by a defender.
- A new version of the play-the-ball was created which consisted of two players from each team. The ball was contested by only the defending marker and tackled player who was playing the ball, the marker was required to keep both feet on the ground until the ball was dropped or placed. The other two players stood ready act as halfback should their teammate win the contest. Amended: ARL, 1997.

1927

(United Kingdom) RFL Implemented: 1927–28 Northern Rugby Football League season.

- Play-the-ball rules were amended for the 1927–28 season with the 1926 Australian development in which the play-the-ball consisted of two defensive markers, the tackled player and the acting half-back. Amended: RFL, 1996.

=== 1930s ===
1931

(Australia) NSWRFL Implemented: 1931 NSWRFL season.

- The defending halfback would now feed the scrum, while the attacking side would have the loose-head. Previously, the player that fed the scrum had been the attacking halfback. Amended: NSWRFL, 1982.
- It became mandatory for each team's forwards to pack-down into the scrum in a 3–2–1 formation.
- Scrums now had to be set a minimum of 10 yards (9.1 m) from the touch line and a minimum of 5 yards (4.6 m) from goal line.
- Players who were off-side at the time of the play-the-ball would now be penalised if they did not make an attempt to get on-side and interfere with or obstruct an opposing player.

1932

(Australia) NSWRFL Implemented: 1932 NSWRFL season.

- A loose-arm rule is introduced, hookers must now place both arms over the props next to them.
- The penalty was changed to allow a team awarded one to have the option of having a scrum rather than a 'free kick'.

=== 1940s ===
1948

(Australia) NSWRFL Implemented: 1948 NSWRFL season.

- The opposing front rows in a scrum were prevented from packing down against each other until ordered to do so by the referee.

=== 1950s ===
1950

(United Kingdom) RFL Implemented: 1950–51 Northern Rugby Football League season.

- The field goal, which was scored by kicking a loose ball above the cross bar and between the posts, was abolished from the laws.

1951

(Australia) NSWRFL Implemented: 1951 NSWRFL season.

- A five-yard (4.6 m) ruck rule was introduced and applied to both teams, previously there had been a 'no-yard' ruck rule. This rule change lasted just one season. Amended: NSWRFL, 1952.

1952

(Australia) NSWRFL Implemented: 1952 NSWRFL season.

- The no-yard ruck rule was reinstated. Amended: NSWRFL, 1956.
- The dummy-half and second-marker were required to stand one yard (0.91 m) behind the two men contesting the play-the-ball. Abolished: NSWRFL, 1956.

1954

(Australia) NSWRFL Implemented: 1954 NSWRFL season.

- The tap penalty was introduced. Abolished: NSWRFL, 1959.
- A team conceding a penalty was required to retire 10 yards (9.1 m).

1956

(Australia) NSWRFL Implemented: 1956 NSWRFL season.

- A 3-yard (2.7 m) ruck rule replaced the no-yard ruck rule and was applicable to both teams. Amended: NSWRFL, 1966.
- No minimum distance replaced the one-yard (0.91 m) minimum that the dummy-half and second-marker had previously had to stand behind their teammates contesting the play-the-ball.

1959

(Australia) NSWRFL Implemented: 1959 NSWRFL season.

- The tap penalty was abolished. Restored: NSWRFL, 1967.

=== 1960s ===
1961

(Australia) NSWRFL Implemented: 1961 NSWRFL season.

- In an effort to discourage incessant and purposeless runs by the dummy-halves, a rule was made that should the dummy-half be tackled after running with the ball there would be a scrum. Repealed: NSWRFL, 1963.

1963

(Australia) NSWRFL Implemented: 1963 NSWRFL season.

- The rule that a dummy-half caught with ball would result in a scrum was rescinded. Dummy-half runs were now unrestricted.
- The ball leaving the scrum was required to come out behind the second-rowers.
- The non-offending team would now be given the loose-head and feed at a scrum resulting from a penalty, this included after the team had kicked into touch. Amended: NSWRFL, 1967.
- Teams were allowed to replace a maximum of two injured players during the first half of a match and including halftime. Amended: NSWRFL, 1970.

1964

(Australia) NSWRFL Implemented: 1964 NSWRFL season.

- Scrums would now be set a minimum of 10 yards (9.1 m) from the goal-line.
- A place kick from the halfway line was used for the kick-off restarting play after an unconverted try.
- A penalty on halfway would now be awarded if a kick-off went out on the full.

1966

(Australia) NSWRFL Implemented: 1966 NSWRFL season.

- A five-yard (4.6 m) ruck rule, applying to both teams, was implemented; an increase from three yards (2.7 m).

(United Kingdom) RFL Implemented: 1966–67 Northern Rugby Football League season.

- A four-tackle rule was introduced in December 1966. The rule ended unlimited tackles, a by-product from the introduction of the play-the-ball in 1906. The sport's administrators were concerned that teams were becoming obsessed with retaining possession, as it was possible to keep the ball for long periods, to the detriment of the game being an exciting spectacle. A match between Hull Kingston Rovers and Huddersfield was a catalyst for this significant change; after Huddersfield kicked off, they were only able to touch the ball twice during the whole of the first half of the game. Rugby Football League secretary Bill Fallowfield devised and proposed the four-tackle rule with Australian authorities supporting the change as they were experiencing similar concerns for the game in Australia and wanted to improve the game's flow and pace. The change had a significant impact on the style of play and helped to create a product suited to television. Amended: RFL, 1972.

1967

(Australia) NSWRFL Implemented: 1967 NSWRFL season.

- The four-tackle rule was introduced to replace unlimited tackles. Amended: NSWRFL, 1971.
- The tap penalty was reintroduced following its withdrawal in 1959.
- Scrums were replaced by a tap kick at restarts following penalty kicks into touch.

1968

(Australia) NSWRFL Implemented: 1968 NSWRFL season.

- Defending teams would restart with a 25-yard (23 m) optional kick should an attacking team make the ball dead.

1969

(Australia) NSWRFL Implemented: 1969 NSWRFL season.

- The front-row were required to pack 'square' in scrums.

=== 1970s ===
1970

(Australia) NSWRFL Implemented: 1970 NSWRFL season.

- Two injured players were allowed to be replaced at any time during a game, provided that the replacements had played at least half of a lower-grade game that day. Amended: NSWRFL, 1981.
- If a player goes down injured the ball is simply given to a teammate to play rather than the game being halted so a doctor can be called onto the field.

1971

(Australia) NSWRFL Implemented: 1971 NSWRFL season.

- Value of a drop goal was reduced from two points to one point.
- The six-tackle rule was introduced, replacing the four-tackle rule.

1972

(United Kingdom) RFL Implemented: 1972–73 Northern Rugby Football League season.

- The six-tackle rule was introduced for the 1972–73 season with the aim of alleviating the "disjointed" play experienced with the four-tackle rule.

=== 1980s ===
1981

(Australia) NSWRFL Implemented: 1981 NSWRFL season.

- Temporary suspensions of players, known as the "sin-bin", are introduced for misconduct.
- The differential scrum penalty is introduced.
- Four replacements of players on the field are allowed during matches. Amended: NSWRL, 1988.

1982

(Australia) NSWRFL Implemented: 1982 NSWRFL season.

- Loose-head and feed were now given to non-offending team at the scrum.

1983

(Australia) NSWRFL Implemented: 1983 NSWRFL season.

- The value of try was increased from three points to four points.
- The handover was introduced if a team was caught in possession after the sixth tackle. This replaced the scrum in this situation.

1986

(Australia) NSWRL Implemented: 1986 NSWRL season.

- A twenty m (22-yard) restart was given when the ball was caught on the full in the in-goal area by a member of the defending team.

1987

(Australia) NSWRL Implemented: 1987 NSWRL season.

- The 'Head-bin' was introduced for players suffering minor head injuries. The injured players were allowed to return to the field of play after 10 minutes without affecting team's quota of replacements. Replaced: NSWRL, 1991.
- A team that kicked the ball into touch in own half of the field, up to the fourth tackle, was awarded the ball feed at the following scrum. This rule was suspended before the 1987 NSWRL season play-offs. Repealed: NSWRL, 1987.

1988

(Australia) NSWRL Implemented: 1988 NSWRL season.

- Two fresh replacements were now allowed, previously they had had to have played in a lower-grade game earlier. Amended: NSWRL, 1991.

1989

(Australia) NSWRL Implemented: 1989 NSWRL season.

- The use of the handover was extended to those occasions on the sixth tackle when the attacking team knocked on, kicked out on the full, or ran into touch.
- When a scrum took place, all players standing outside it, apart from the halfback, had to stand a minimum of 5 m (5.5 yards) back to be onside.

=== 1990s ===
1990

(Australia) NSWRL Implemented: 1990 NSWRL season.

- In-goal touch judges were introduced for the finals series.
- Any players chasing their team's kick from an offside position were required to remain 10 m (11 yards) away from the opponent taking possession of the ball. This was an increase from 5 m (5.5 yards).

1991

(Australia) NSWRL Implemented: 1991 NSWRL season.

- A penalty would now be given against a defender guilty of stripping the ball from opponent in possession.
- The interchange rule was introduced, it allowed four players, consisting of up to two fresh reserves and a minimum of two players who had played half a game of the preceding Reserve Grade or President's Cup, unlimited interchanges during a match. The rule's main purpose was to reduce the risk of blood-borne diseases being spread but an angry public reaction forced a modification in April. The rule changed to allow a total of four players to be available for a maximum of six interchanges during a match. Players sent to the 'blood-bin' would not count among these six interchanges. Amended: ARL, 1996.

1993

IRLB Implemented: 1993 NSWRL season.

- A new definition was agreed for a high tackle which stated that it was illegal to make contact with the head or neck whether it was done "intentionally, recklessly or carelessly". Some coaches, such as Tim Sheens, voiced concerns that the rule was flawed because it would penalise accidental contact with the head or neck but Mick Stone, the NSWRL referees coaching co-ordinator, dismissed this stating accidental contact was not necessarily covered by the definition of "intentionally, recklessly, or carelessly".
- The ball could be fed into the scrum providing that it entered between the opposing front-rowers' outside feet. This change meant referees would no longer need to check that the scrum half had put the ball into the middle of the scrum tunnel. Mick Stone said the new ruling gave referees "a very tangible line to look at". Stone said, "if the ball [enters] behind the front-rowers' foot, bang, it's a penalty". Stone believed that the ruling was an improvement on the situation during the previous season in Australia when the ball was being fed "under the second-rowers' or locks' (loose-forward) feet", he believed the change would "allow the halfback (scrum-half) a fair amount of latitude" while giving "the side without the feed a look at the ball".

(Australia) NSWRL Implemented: 1993 NSWRL season.

- The distance the defensive line were taken back by the referee at the play-the-ball would now be measured from where the tackled player places the ball to play it. Previously the distance had been measured from the back foot of the marker but Mick Stone, the referees coaching coordinator, felt that this led to "fives" of varying lengths depending on where the markers stood.
- The defensive line at the play-the-ball would now be taken back 8 m (8.7 yards) instead of 5 m (5.5 yards) to compensate for the change in the position the distance was measured from. The 8-metre (8.7-yard) distance was amended mid-season. Amended: NSWRL, 1993.
- A ten-metre (11-yard) offside rule was introduced mid-season for non-markers on the defending team at the play-the-ball, amending the 8-metre (8.7-yard) rule introduced at the beginning of the season.

1994

(United Kingdom) RFL Implemented: 1994–95 Rugby Football League season.

- Referees were given the power to put a player suspected of foul play "on report" with the incident to be reviewed later by the disciplinary panel. The system was based on the one already operating in Australian rugby league. Referees signalled that an incident had been put "on report" by crossing their arms above their heads.
- In-goal judges were trialled, these two additional match officials are positioned behind the dead-ball line at each end of the playing field and aim to aid the referee in judging if a try has been scored. The in-goal judges had been used in Australia for two years.
- Referees penalised defending players lifting attackers in the tackle in a way that could lead to an illegal spear tackle.

1996

SLIB Implemented: 1996 Super League World Nines.

- The video referee was used for the first time. The video referee could be used when the match referee was not sure a try had been scored and wanted to check if a player had stayed in the field of play, if the player had grounded the ball correctly, double movements, if there had been any obstruction, and whether the players involved in the "immediate passage leading up the potential try being scored" were onside or offside.

(Australia) (New Zealand) ARL Implemented: 1996 ARL season.

- Unlimited interchanges were re-introduced. Amended: NRL, 2001.

(United Kingdom) (France) RFL Implemented: Super League I.

- Scrums were now to be set 20 m (22 yards) from the touch-line, with the aim of creating attacking opportunities.
- At the restart after a try had been scored and the conversion attempt had been taken, the side that scored now kicked off to the other team. This change aimed to make contests more even by almost guaranteeing possession for the side that had conceded points. Greg McCallum, the director of referees' coaching, also noted that this convention was "in line with most other sports" and "that is significant when we come to promoting the game in America and Asia".
- At the play-the-ball, the side not in possession was barred from striking for the ball. This was an attempt to clean up the ruck.
- At the play-the-ball, the tackled player was stopped from being able to tap the ball forwards to himself – even in the absence of markers.

1997

(Australia) ARL Implemented: 1997 ARL season.

- Striking by the defending marker at the play-the-ball was banned.
- The requirement for the attacking team to stand a minimum distance behind dummy-half at the play-the-ball was ended.
- The 40/20 rule was introduced to reward accurate kicking in general play and to disrupt the pattern of teams having turns at sets of six tackles. The rule gave the loose head and feed at the resulting scrum to a team that kicked the ball from behind their 40-metre (44-yard) line so that it bounced in the field of play before going into touch behind their opponent's 20-metre (22-yard) line. The rule also encouraged the defenders, usually wingers and fullbacks, to make a play for the ball instead of allowing it to leave play.
- New guidelines were introduced to combat 'dangerous throws'.
- Tackled players were banned from playing the ball forward to themselves. There was some concern that this could stifle play if a supporting teammate was slow to move into the dummy-half position to allow a play-the-ball.

(New Zealand) SL (A) Implemented: 1997 Super League (Australia) season.

- The video referee used. Adopted: NRL, 1998.
- The zero tackle rule was introduced. Defending teams were given an extra tackle when they received the ball if their player ran it back rather than allowing the ball to leave play if, for example, the attacking team kicked the ball. This was an attempt to reward positive play and break the cycle of teams taking turns to have six tackles. Adopted: NRL, 1998.
- Tackled players were banned from playing the ball forward to themselves. As with the equivalent change by the ARL, there was some concern that this could stifle play.
- The kick-off following points being scored was altered so that the non-scoring team was to receive the kick. One intention of this change was to "narrow the gap between good and bad teams".

1998

(Australia) (New Zealand) NRL Implemented: 1998 NRL season.

- The Zero tackle was adopted for the unified competition.
- The video referee was adopted.

1999

(United Kingdom) RFL Implemented: Super League IV.

- The 40/20 rule was introduced. The 40/20 had been used in Australia since 1997.

=== 2000s ===
2001

(Australia) (New Zealand) NRL Implemented: 2001 NRL season.

- A defending player jumping to catch the ball from an opponent's kick cannot be tackled mid-air. This rule was brought in due to safety consideration. The rule allows for defending players to tackle the attacking players in the air. There had been concerns from coaches that allowing an attacker to land with the ball before attempting a tackle could result in "uncontested tries" or a penalty try if a tackle was attempted while they were in the air; either of these scenarios was considered against the principles of the game.
- A team that finds touch with a kick from a 20-metre (22-yard) optional restart is awarded the loose head and feed at the scrum.
- If from a kick anywhere on the field, the defending team takes the ball dead, for example if they place one foot over the dead ball line before playing at the ball, the team must restart play with a goal-line drop-out.
- The defending team were allowed to strip the ball in the tackle if no more than two tacklers were in attendance.
- Limited interchanges were reintroduced, a maximum of 12 interchanges were now allowed using a pool of 4 replacements. Amended: NRL, 2008.

(United Kingdom) RFL Implemented: Super League VI.

- 20-metre (22-yard) restarts should be allowed to happen quickly and not be delayed by referees.
- The first and second halves would end the moment that the hooter sounds, in the past referees could use their discretion to let play continue if they felt the siren had sounded during play.

2003

(United Kingdom) RFL Implemented: Super League VIII.

- The knock-on rule was modified so that if in the referee's judgement a player did not play at the ball, a knock-on would not be given.
- New interchange and substitution rules were introduced. The number of interchanges, which now included blood bins, increased from 6 to 12 using a pool of 4 substitutes. This change aimed to retain the element of wearing down a team's opponents during the game – which was considered part of the character of the sport. Stuart Cummings, the Rugby Football League's technical controller said the changes "bring us into line with the international rules" and ruled out future increases as well as declaring, "We will never see the unlimited interchange introduced into rugby league in Britain," a change that had caused controversy in Australia during its experiment there.

2004

(Australia) (New Zealand) NRL Implemented: 2004 NRL season.

- Should an attacking player be held up by defenders in-goal, they should carry on play with a play-the-ball on the 10-metre (11-yard) line.

2006

(Australia) (New Zealand) NRL Implemented: 2006 NRL season.

- Taps from penalty kicks to touch were now to be taken 20 m (22 yards) infield. Amended: NRL, 2009.

2008

(Australia) (New Zealand) NRL Implemented: 2008 NRL season.

- The maximum number of interchanges that could be made from a pool of four replacements was reduced from 12 to 10.
- A second tackler was now permitted to strip the ball if the attacker carrying it was attempting to place ball for a try.

(United Kingdom) (France) RFL Implemented: Super League XIII.

- If a team kicks the ball from a 20-metre (22-yard) restart and the ball bounces into touch or over the dead ball line they will be given head and feed at the resulting scrum.
- In the scrum the ball can no longer be trapped by the loose forward in an attempt to catch the opposition offside. If the scrum moves forwards and the ball comes from between and behind the inner feet of the second row forwards it will be deemed to be out of the scrum.
- Defenders, excluding the markers at a play-the-ball, must stand with both feet behind the referee's front foot to be judged onside.
- If over their try-line the defenders steal the ball from the attacking team when there is more than one defender involved in the tackle a penalty will be given rather than a penalty try.

2009

(Australia) (New Zealand) NRL Implemented: 2009 NRL season.

- An assistant on-field referee was introduced.
- A penalty can be applied by the referee against a defender where the attacking kicker has been tackled whilst they are in the air.
- The tap from penalty kick to touch to be taken 10 m (11 yards) infield.

=== 2010s ===
2010

(United Kingdom) (France) RFL Implemented: Super League XV.

- Referees would now call "held" if one of the ball-carrier's legs was lifted by a defender in a tackle in which the participants were stood upright. Previously, a referee would only declare the tackle complete if both legs had been lifted. The change was intended to increase player safety.
- Referees now called held as soon as they see the ball-carrier being dragged by more than one defender. This rule interpretation was intended to increase player safety by preventing groups of defenders dragging an opponent into touch or the in-goal area.

(Australia) (New Zealand) NRL Implemented: 2010 NRL season.

- During the 2010 season, a rule change to the playing field was implemented so that if a player in possession of the ball made contact with the corner post that player would no longer be considered to be touch in-goal. Proponents of the move argued a series a possible future scenarios made this preventative measure necessary, with ARL chief executive Geoff Carr stating, "no one has thought of the possibility of using the corner post as a weapon to defuse a try and we want to stop it before they do". One scenario was that a defending player might manipulate the corner post to put an attacker out of play. Another concern cited was that the corner post might be made to make contact with a rolling ball to ensure the defending team gains possession with a 20-metre restart. Corner posts, which sometimes lean to one side, have no upper height limit set and this led to a fear that corner posts might become "long rubber snakes, biting attackers and sending them into touch", in the words of Roy Masters. Other laws concerning the corner posts remained unchanged. A ball that makes contact with the corner post while not in the possession of a player will be deemed to be touch in-goal as before. There was no attempt to remove the corner posts from the playing field as they are used to promote sponsors and are also a useful aid for players to judge their kicks. The change was agreed by the NRL Board and approved by the RLIF as an experimental rule. Implementation occurred mid-season following feedback from clubs.

2011

(United Kingdom) (France) RFL Implemented: Super League XVI.

- A new stricter variation on the ruck and holding down was introduced in 2011. When the referee calls "held" and "move", the tackle is deemed to be completed, and any further infringement from that point on in the ruck is penalised.

2012

(United Kingdom) (France) RFL Implemented: Super League XVII.

- Teams will now only be able to make 10 interchanges in a match which has been reduced from 12. Amended: Super League, 2019.
- If a player in possession of the ball hits the corner flag he will no longer be deemed 'In Touch'.
- After a try, teams now have the option of taking the conversion as a drop-kick instead of from a tee.

2013

(United Kingdom) (France) RFL Implemented: Super League XVIII.

- The advantage rule was changed.

2016:

(Australia) NRL Implemented: 2016 NRL season.

- Interchanges reduced from 10 to 8.

2019

(United Kingdom) (France) RFL Implemented: Super League XXIV.

- The number of interchanges a team can make was reduced from 10 to 8.
- Shot clocks are introduced in an attempt to speed up play and teams will be penalised if they take more than 35 seconds to form a scrum and more than 30 seconds to take a drop-out.
- "Golden point" extra time rule was introduced, where after 80 minutes, if a game was drawn, then 10 minutes of extra time was played until one team scored the winning point(s).

== See also ==
- Rugby league gameplay
- Rugby league positions
- Rugby league match officials
- Rugby league playing field
- History of rugby league
- List of rugby league terms

== See also ==
- Laws of the Game (association football)
