= Geoff Carr =

Australian rugby league footballer

Geoff Carr OAM
Personal information
- Full name: Geoffrey Marc Carr
- Born: 1952 (age 73–74) Grafton, New South Wales, Australia

Playing information
- Position: Centre, Wing
Club
Years	Team	Pld	T	G	FG	P
1970–74	St. George	59	27	0	0	81

Geoffrey Marc Carr OAM (born 1952) is an Australian former professional rugby league footballer who played in the 1970s and administrated in the 1990s and 2000s. He was the CEO of the Australian Rugby League as well as the New South Wales Rugby League.

== Playing career ==
Originally from Grafton, New South Wales, Carr played first grade in the NSWRL premiership with the St. George Dragons for five seasons between 1970 and 1975. and played in the 1971 Grand Final under mastercoach Jack Gibson.

== Administrative career ==
Carr was appointed secretary of the St. George club in 1989. He later became the club's chief executive, and in 1995 after exploring the possibility of a merger with the Roosters in an attempt to match the turnover of the Brisbane Broncos, was sacked by his board. He then joined the ARL and was team manager for Australia in their successful1995 World Cup campaign. Carr later also worked for the National Rugby League. Carr became CEO of the ARL in 2000 and was later appointed New South Wales Rugby League chief executive.

He announced his retirement from full-time administration in 2013.

Carr was awarded the Medal of the Order of Australia in the 2020 Australia Day Honours for "service to rugby league."
