= Rugby league gameplay =

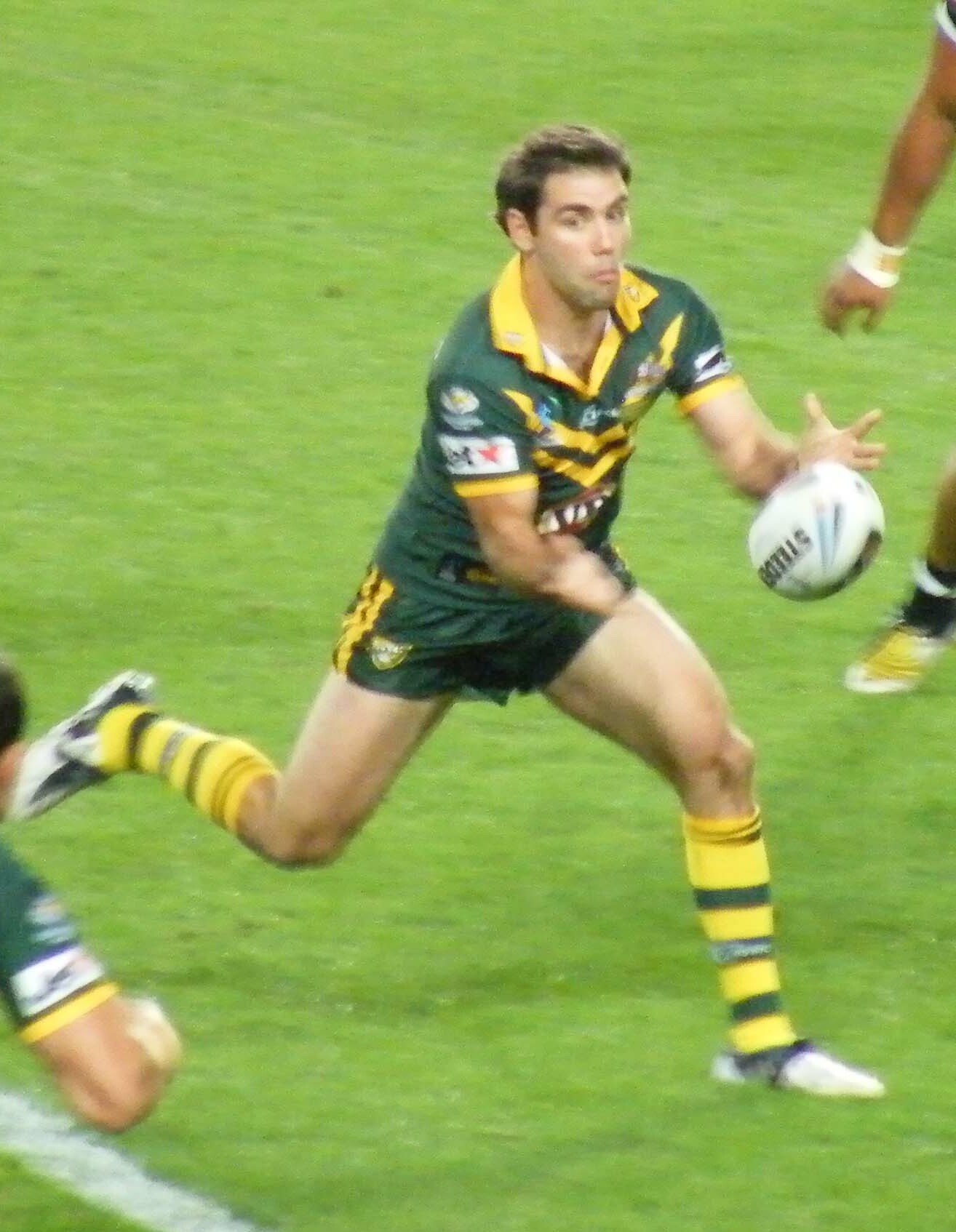
Cameron Smith passes during a rugby league match

Like most forms of modern football, rugby league football is played outdoors on a rectangular grass field with goals at each end that are attacked and defended by two opposing teams. The rules of rugby league have changed significantly over the decades since rugby football split into the league and union codes. This article details the modern form of the game and how it is generally played today, although rules do vary slightly between specific competitions.

== Basics ==
Typical markings for a rugby league field

=== Field ===
A game of rugby league consists of two forty-minute halves, played by two teams on a rectangular grass field 120 metres long and 58–68 metres wide, depending on the individual ground. In the middle of the field is the 50-metre "halfway" line. Each side of the field, on either side of the 50-metre line, is identical. 10 metres from the 50-metre line is the 40-metre line, followed by the 30, 20, 10-metre and goal or "try" lines. This makes up 100 metres of field that is used for general play.

At the middle of each goal line is a set of goal posts in the shape of the capital letter "H", used for point scoring from kicks (drop goals, penalty goals, and conversions). Six to twelve metres beyond each goal-line is the dead ball line. The area between these two lines is called the in-goal area, and varies from field to field.

The dead ball lines and the touch-lines (side lines) make up the boundary of the field of play. If the ball (or any part of the body of a player in possession of the ball) touches the ground on or beyond any of these lines, the ball is said to be dead, and play must be restarted. This is done by one of two ways. If the ball goes dead, play restarts at the 20 metre line closer to where it went dead. If it goes into touch, a scrum is played.

=== Players ===
All rugby league players must be particularly physically fit and tough because of the game's fast pace and the expansive size of the playing-field as well as the inherently rough physical contact involved. Depending on his exact role or position, a player's size, strength and/or speed can provide different advantages (or disadvantages). Effective teamwork is also extremely important.

=== Mode of play ===
After a coin toss with the two captains and referee, the winner elects either to kick off or to receive the kick off and chooses which end of the field to attack for the first half. The ends change over after the half-time break.

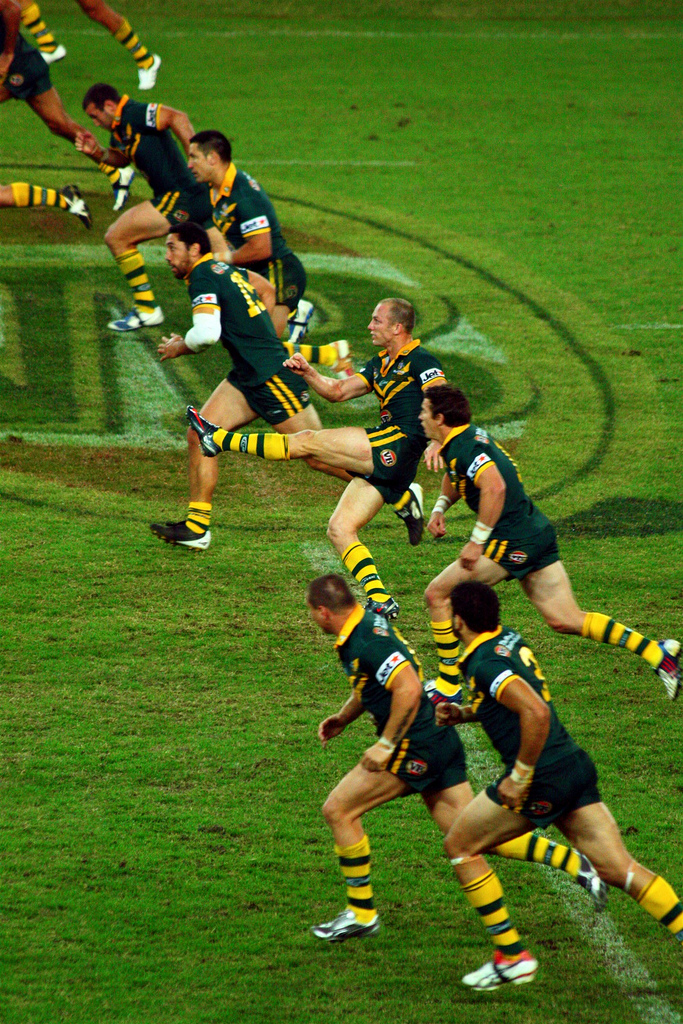
Players chase the ball after a kick-off. They must be behind or in line with the kicker when his foot hits the ball.

Play commences once the ball has been kicked off from the ground in the centre of the field by one team to the other. The longer and higher the kick, the more advantageous, as this forces the team receiving the ball to return it from deeper within their own territory. If a long or misdirected kick goes out of the field of play without first bouncing, a penalty is awarded to the non-kicking team from the halfway line, but if a kicked ball lands in the field of play and then bounces out, the kicking team receives possession at the point of entry. A short kick off may be employed to regain possession, but it must travel at least beyond the 10 metre line; they are usually attempted towards the end of closely fought matches when time is scarce and points are needed.

Each team is responsible for defending their end of the field, and they take turns throughout a game at defending and attacking. At half-time (the 40th minute of the game), the teams have a 10-minute break, then swap ends before resuming play.

The team with possession of the football is the team in attack. The primary aim of this team is to "work" the ball out from their own end of the field, into a more favourable position towards the opposition's end, and score a try by grounding the ball in the opposition's in-goal area or on the goal line. In some circumstances, the team in attack may opt to kick a one-point drop goal instead of attempting to score a try. Scoring will at least involve first gaining field position and, in the case of scoring a try, will almost certainly involve breaking the opposition's defensive line.

The objective of the defensive side is to prevent the team in possession from scoring and obtaining their shorter term objectives. The defensive team carries out these objectives by:

- maintaining the defensive line
- providing last-ditch defenders
- preventing a try

Favourable field position is an important aim in rugby league, a goal present in the minds of players at almost all times. Possession of the ball is the primary aim of each team. When in possession the aim is to maintain possession and score by running in packs and trying to minimise ball-handling errors and penalties conceded (which always result in a changeover of possession). When not in possession the aim is to prevent the opposition from scoring, prevent or reduce the incidence of the opposition carrying the ball forward, and ultimately to gain possession of the ball.

==== Point scoring ====
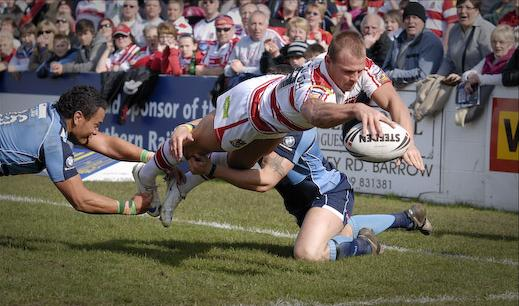
A player attempting to score a try

There are four ways to score in rugby league: tries, conversions, penalty goals, and drop goals.

- The try is worth four points and is the primary means of scoring. To score a try, the ball must be placed with controlled downward pressure on the goal line (also called the try line) or in the in-goal area between the goal line and the dead ball line using the hand, forearm, or torso area. This is referred to as grounding the football. If the player scoring the try is also being tackled at the same time, the try must be completed before or at the moment the tackle is completed. Occasionally, when it is deemed that a try would certainly have been scored were it not for a rule infringement of a defending player, a penalty try can be awarded (instead of a regular penalty) directly under the goal posts regardless of where the offence took place. Because the referee must be certain that the try "would have" been scored, penalty tries are uncommon. Even more uncommon are 8-point tries, where in the process of a try being scored, a severe infringement by the defensive team has been committed, such as a dangerous tackle or ensuing violence. In this circumstance four points are awarded for the try and two attempts are allowed at goal, one in line with the try and the other directly in front, giving a possible 8 points.
- Following a try, the scoring team has a chance to convert the try from four points to six with a place kicked goal over the crossbar and between the uprights of the goal-posts; this is known as a conversion and the six-point total is known as a converted try. The kick may be taken from a position perpendicular to the goal line opposite the location that the try was scored. The kick may be taken as close or as far from the goal line as the kicker prefers. In Europe and under the international rules it is also permissible to take the conversion attempt with a drop kick rather than a place kick. Try-scorers will sometimes attempt to "improve the angle" for the kicker by grounding the football as close to the goal-posts as possible.

Change in scoring values over time
Period	Try	Conversion	Penalty	Drop goal	Goal from mark
1895–1897	3	2	3	4	4
1897–1922	3	2	2	2	2
1922–1950	3	2	2	2	–
1950–1971	3	2	2	2	–
1971–1983	3	2	2	1	–
1983–2021	4	2	2	1	–
2021-present	4	2	2	1 (2)	-

- When a team is awarded a penalty, they are given the choice of taking a two-point penalty kick from the point that the offence took place, or attacking with a set of six tackles in the hope of scoring a four-point try. Depending on the proximity to the goal posts and other circumstances of the game, the team's captain will choose between these options. As with other goals, the kick must pass both over the crossbar and between the uprights of the goal-posts.
- In the event of a foul being committed on a player as or after that player succeeds in scoring a try, the scoring team will be awarded a penalty kick in addition to the conversion attempt. In such a circumstance, the conversion attempt is taken in line with where the ball was grounded, followed by a penalty goal attempt taken from directly in front of the goal posts, regardless of the spot of the foul. Should both kicks be successful, this event is often referred to as an 8-point try. The 8-point try differs from a penalty try, because the attacking player must have successfully scored the try.
- A drop goal (also known as a field goal) is worth only one point. Since 2021 domestic matches in Australia reward a drop goal kicked from more than 40m out with two points. Thus, it is the least chosen method of scoring. It is attempted during general play, and to be valid must be made by a drop kick, and as with penalty and conversion goals, must pass both over the crossbar and between the uprights of the goal-posts. Drop goals are usually attempted when in good field position in an attempt to secure a win late in a close game or when the scores are within a converted try (6 points) of each other so that, if successful, their opponents must score at least twice to avoid losing. Less commonly, drop goals may be attempted just before half-time, to secure the most points scored in the first half. Additionally, it is a common way to win matches in competitions that use golden point extra time to decide games that are tied after normal time has elapsed. Unnecessary or unlikely attempts at field goal have become less common with the advent of the zero tackle rule, with a miss generally resulting in a seven-tackle set restart from the 20m line for the opposing side.

==== Passing ====
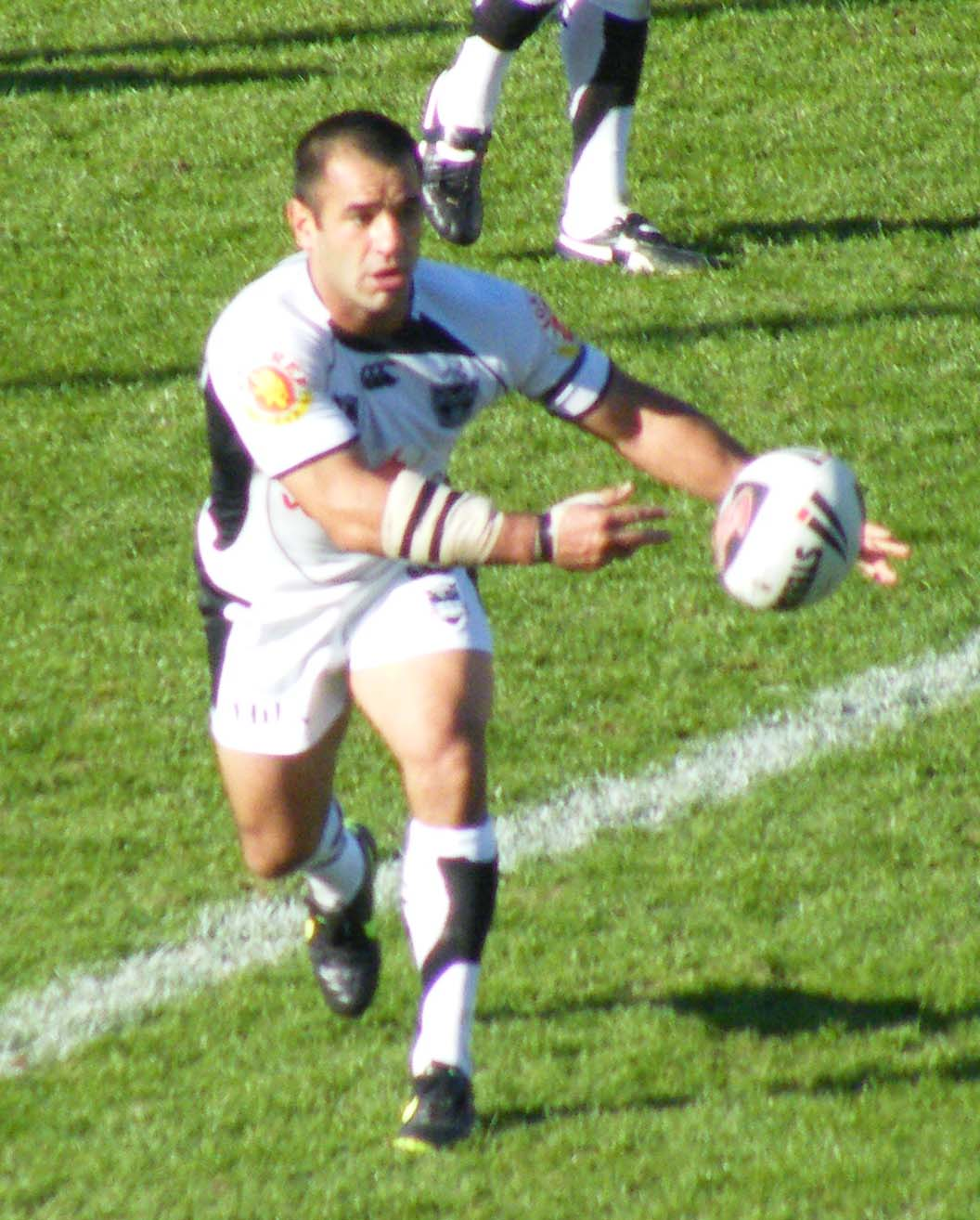
As a halfback, Stacey Jones is relied on to direct the ball to his players by passing.

Players on the team with possession may pass the ball to one another while trying to reach the opposition's end of the field. A player may only pass the ball behind himself, or pass the ball sideways parallel to the trylines. Therefore, the rest of the players on the team in possession must ensure that they are "on-side", and in a position to legally receive the ball by staying behind or in-line with the passer. A pass deemed to have propelled the ball forward is called a "forward pass" and results in an immediate halt to play. A scrum will restart play, as "head and feed" of the scrum will be to the team who did not make the forward pass, a forward pass normally means that possession of the ball is ceded to the opposing side. Passes are also susceptible to interception by enterprising players on the defensive team who anticipate the pass and rush up to catch it, winning possession for their team.

==== Tackling ====
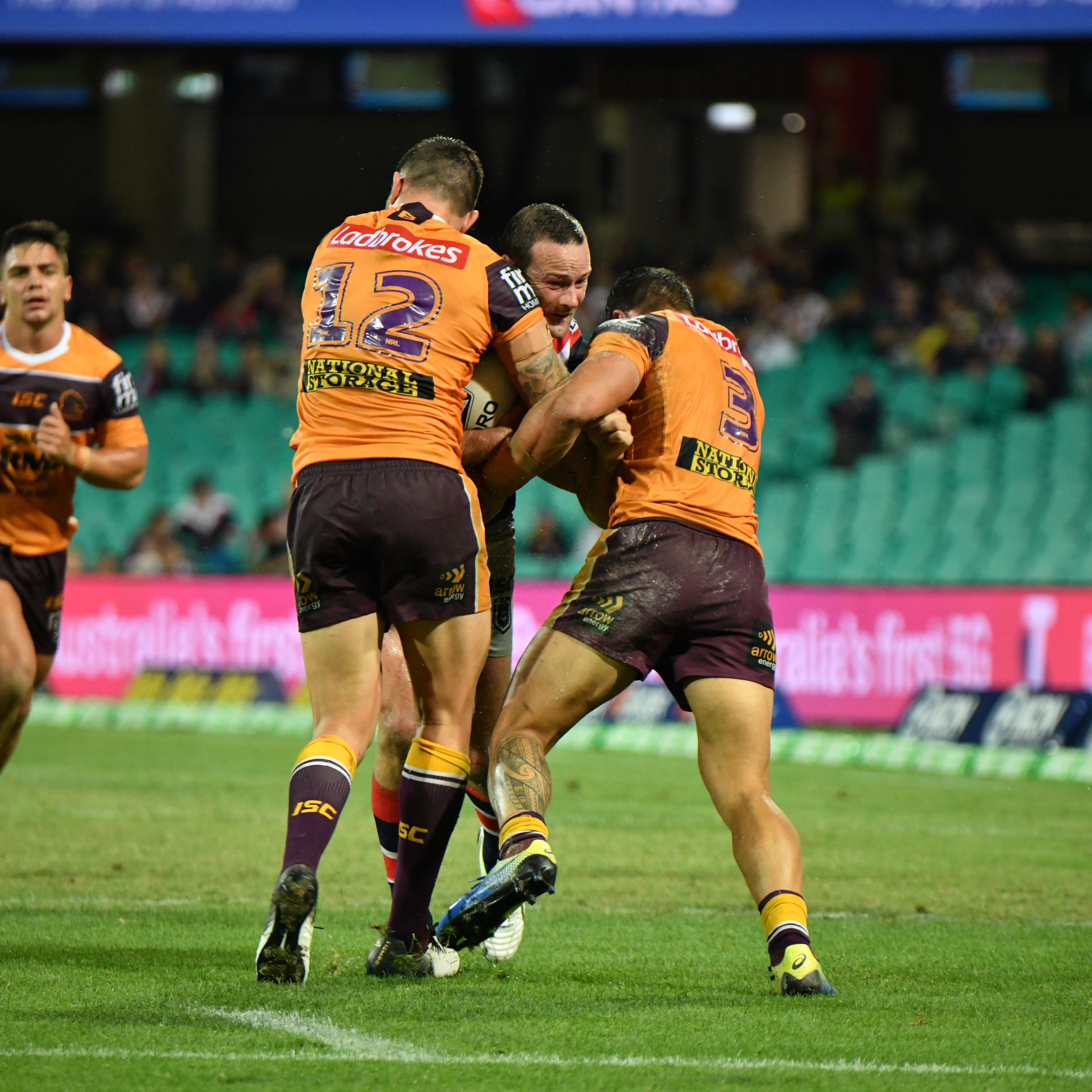
A player being tackled

The defensive team tries to stop the attacking team from scoring by tackling the player with the ball as quickly as possible to prevent him gaining more ground. A tackle forces a halt in play for as long as it takes the tackled player to return to his feet and play the ball. In that time, the defending team, with the exception of two markers, must move back a minimum of 10 metres towards their end of the field. The attacking team restarts play and continues with its next chance to score via the play-the-ball. After each tackle the attacking team should be closer to their opposition's end of the field. A 2012 New Zealand study found that over 659 tackles are made per game in professional rugby league. Of all the rugby league positions, second-row averages the most tackles.

===== Six tackle rule =====
Since 1972, an attacking team has a set of six chances to score, often referred to as six tackles. The referee keeps track of how many tackles have been performed in each set of six. Some referees choose to shout the number of tackles (to avoid any players' confusion as to what point in the tackle count it is); however, this is not a requirement. When a side has used five tackles, the referee signals "fifth tackle" by raising an arm above his head with fingers spread, indicating that five of the tackles in the set have taken place and the next tackle will be the last.

If a sixth tackle is made, a change-over takes place. The defending and attacking teams switch roles, and the new attacking team starts its own set of six by playing the ball at the point on the field where the last tackle was made. Usually the attacking team kicks the ball onwards after the fifth tackle in either a last-ditch attempt to score, or to force the opposition to start their next set of six tackles as far back as possible.

An attacking team may also have seven chances to score in a special circumstance, governed by the zero tackle rule.

==== Play-the-ball ====
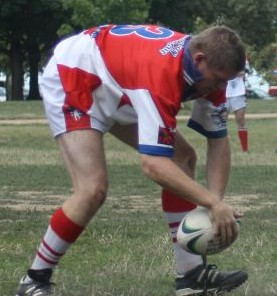
A player about to play the ball.

Play-the-ball is used to restart play in various instances during a game, most commonly immediately following a tackle. The act of the play-the-ball is sometimes referred to simply as "playing the ball". To return the ball to play correctly, the tackled player must:

1. have stopped forward progress (i.e., been tackled)
2. have both feet on the ground
3. place the ball on the ground in front of one foot and
4. roll the ball backwards by use of the boot.

From the moment the ball is rolled back by the tackled player's boot, the next phase of play begins. The "dummy half" is the term used to refer to the player who then picks up the ball and resumes his team's attack.

The ruck is located between the player playing-the-ball and the defending marker. The ruck exists during the time between a tackle being completed and the subsequent play-the-ball being completed. The ball cannot be interfered with by a defending player whilst it is in the ruck, otherwise a penalty will be issued against that player's team. A penalty is also issued against the attacking team if the player responsible for playing the ball does not play it correctly. Many penalties in rugby league occur in and around the ruck.

Part way through the 2020 seasons in both Australia and Europe penalties for defensive infringements at the ruck were replaced by the "six again" rule which gives the attacking team an immediate new set of six tackles.

=== Offside ===
Following a completed tackle, all but two of the defending team (the markers) must retreat at least ten metres from the point at which the tackle is made. This distance is marked by the referee. Following the play-the-ball, defenders are permitted to advance to try to put pressure on the attackers and to reduce the distance they can make with the ball. If a defender who has failed to retreat 10 metres interferes with play, then he will be deemed to have been offside and this will result in a penalty to the attacking team. Equally, if a defender advances too quickly before the ball is played, then this will also result in a penalty to the attackers. When a player kicks the ball, his teammates must be behind him, or they will be called for offside if they interfere with the play.

=== Markers ===
During the play-the-ball it is customary for a player from the defending team, called a marker, to stand directly in front of the player playing the ball. If no marker is present, the tackled player may "tap" the ball on his boot to start the next play, instead of the normally required play-the-ball. As the tap is faster to perform than the play-the-ball, giving great advantage to the attack, there is almost always a marker. Usually the person who tackled the player becomes a marker because he is the closest to the tackled player. There may be a maximum of two markers for each play-the-ball, the second standing behind the first.

The marker(s) must stand directly in front of the tackled player; not doing so will result in a penalty. A marker must also not move towards the ball until the play-the-ball has been completed, otherwise he will be penalised.

== Miscellaneous rules ==
=== Knock on ===
If the ball is dropped forwards by an attacker and hits the ground or another player, this constitutes a knock on and possession will be turned over. If the ball is dropped in a backwards motion, it will not be ruled as a knock-on. Equally, if a player fumbles the ball but manages to regather it before it hits the ground or another player then play will be allowed to continue. This rule does not apply if a player is performing a drop-kick.

=== Zero tackle rule ===
If the defending team knocks on or touches the ball when it is in the air, and the ball is immediately regathered by the attacking team, the referee may elect to restart the tackle count in lieu of awarding a scrum, known as the zero tackle rule because the next tackle is counted as 'tackle zero' and not the usual 'tackle one'. The zero tackle rule cannot be used in a set that was started by the zero tackle rule. On awarding the zero tackle rule, the referee will shout "Back to zero!" or "Six again", and wave one arm over his head with fingers clenched into a fist, indicating the attacking side's next tackle is tackle zero. If a player collects the ball directly from an opposition kick in general play, the first time he is tackled does not register on the tackle count. If the receiving player kicks or passes the ball prior to being tackled then this does not apply.

=== Scrum ===
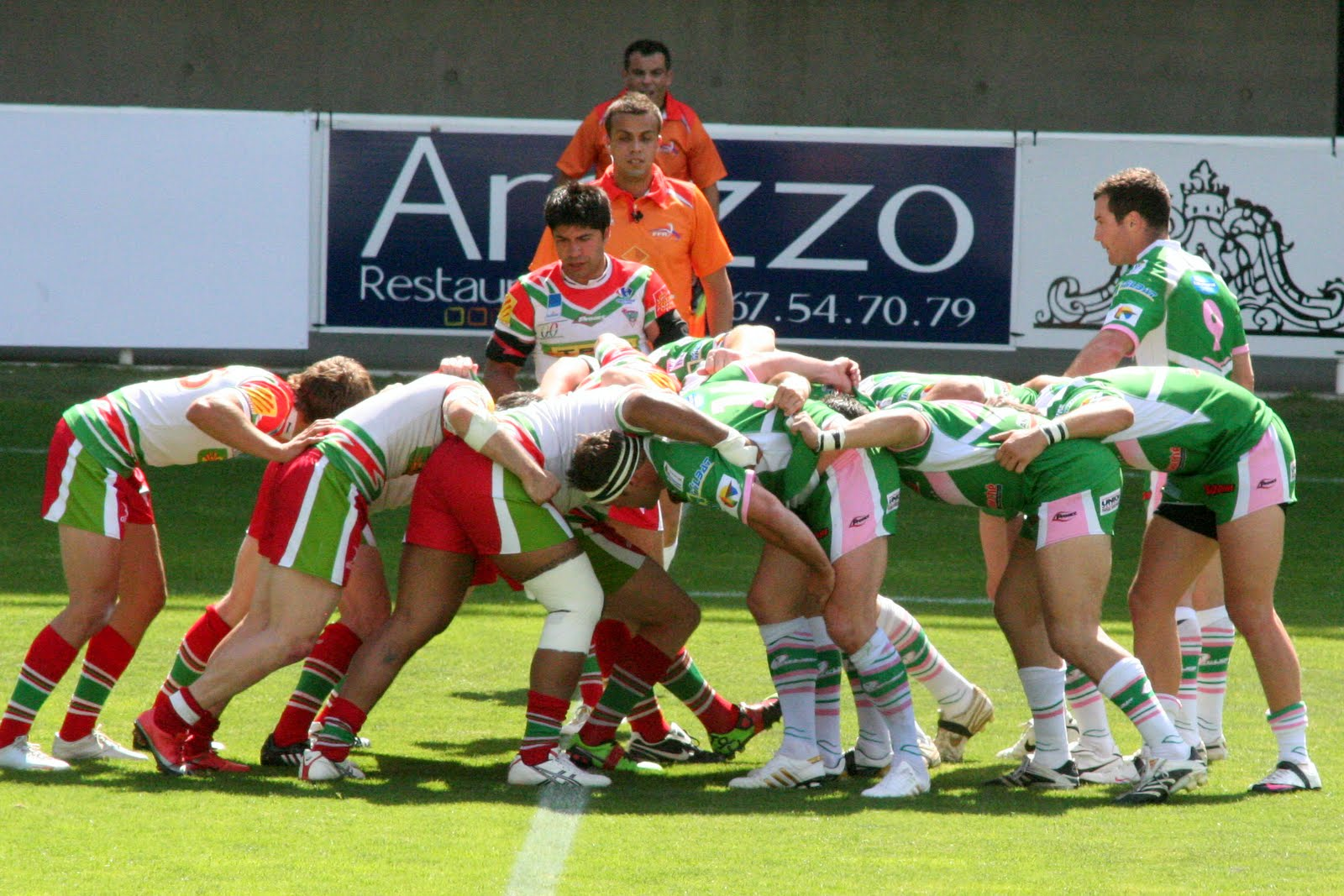
A rugby league scrum

The scrum is formed by the front row forwards of each side locking together, and packing down to push against each other. The second row forwards pack in behind the front rows, and each team's loose forward joins the scrum at the back. The ball is fed through the legs of one of the props by the halfback, who normally then retrieves it from the back of the scrum.

The scrum was traditionally used as a mechanism where the two teams competed for possession of the ball. This has since changed with the introduction of fair, but uncontested scrums, where the ball is fed into the second row, instead of the front row, all but eliminating an effective competition for the ball. Because of these changes the scrum serves to simply remove the forwards from the play for a period, thus creating more space for the backs to attack the depleted defensive line. This is intended to give advantage to the side that is awarded the scrum. It is very rare for a team to win possession of the ball, despite not having the feed, though in such situations the referee may restart the scrum.

A scrum can be awarded following a forward pass, knock on or the ball going over the sideline and into touch.

=== 40–20 and 20–40 kick ===
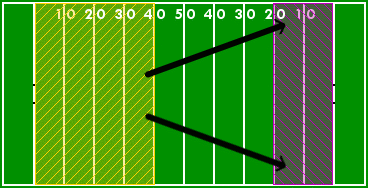
An illustration of the 40–20 rule

The 40–20 rule was introduced by the ARL in Australia in 1997 to further reward accurate kicking in general play. It has since been adopted in Britain as well, at all levels. A 40–20 kick must be both accurate and long. For a successful 40–20:

- the kicker must be behind his side's 40-metre line when he kicks the ball,
- the ball must first hit the ground within the field of play,
- the ball must then go over the sidelines of the field of play (into touch) past the opponent's 20-metre line.

The team that kicked is awarded a tap-kick restart from the point that the ball left the field. Before the 40–20 rule, the non-kicking team would have otherwise been awarded the scrum feed. Until recent years, a successful 40-20 kick resulted in a scrum for the kicking team. This was changed and now the attacking team is awarded a tap restart in line from where the ball went out of bounds.

The 20–40 rule is analogous to the 40–20, but applies to kicks from behind the kicking team's 20-metre line that go into touch beyond the opposing 40-metre line after first hitting the ground. The 20–40 rule was introduced by the NRL in 2020 and the Super League in 2021.

The NRL Women's Premiership has a similar 40–30 rule, where the ball must go into touch past the 30-metre line instead of the 20, in addition to a 20–50 rule which is equivalent to the 20–40 used in men's competition.

=== Goal-line drop-outs ===
If the player in possession of the ball is tackled behind his own goal line, plays the ball over his own dead-ball line, or grounds the ball in his own in-goal area, his team is obliged to perform a drop-kick from between their own goal posts. This kick must travel over the 10-metre line before it is touched by either team. The goal line drop-out usually gives possession back to the opposing team.

The drop-kicking team might attempt to gain possession by executing a short kick and have their players attempt to reach the ball before the other team does, but this carries the risk that the other team could gain possession very close to the try-line. The drop-kicking team might also attempt to gain possession by kicking the ball so that it bounces before going into touch; in that event they would be awarded head and feed at the resulting scrum.

== Disciplinary sanctions ==
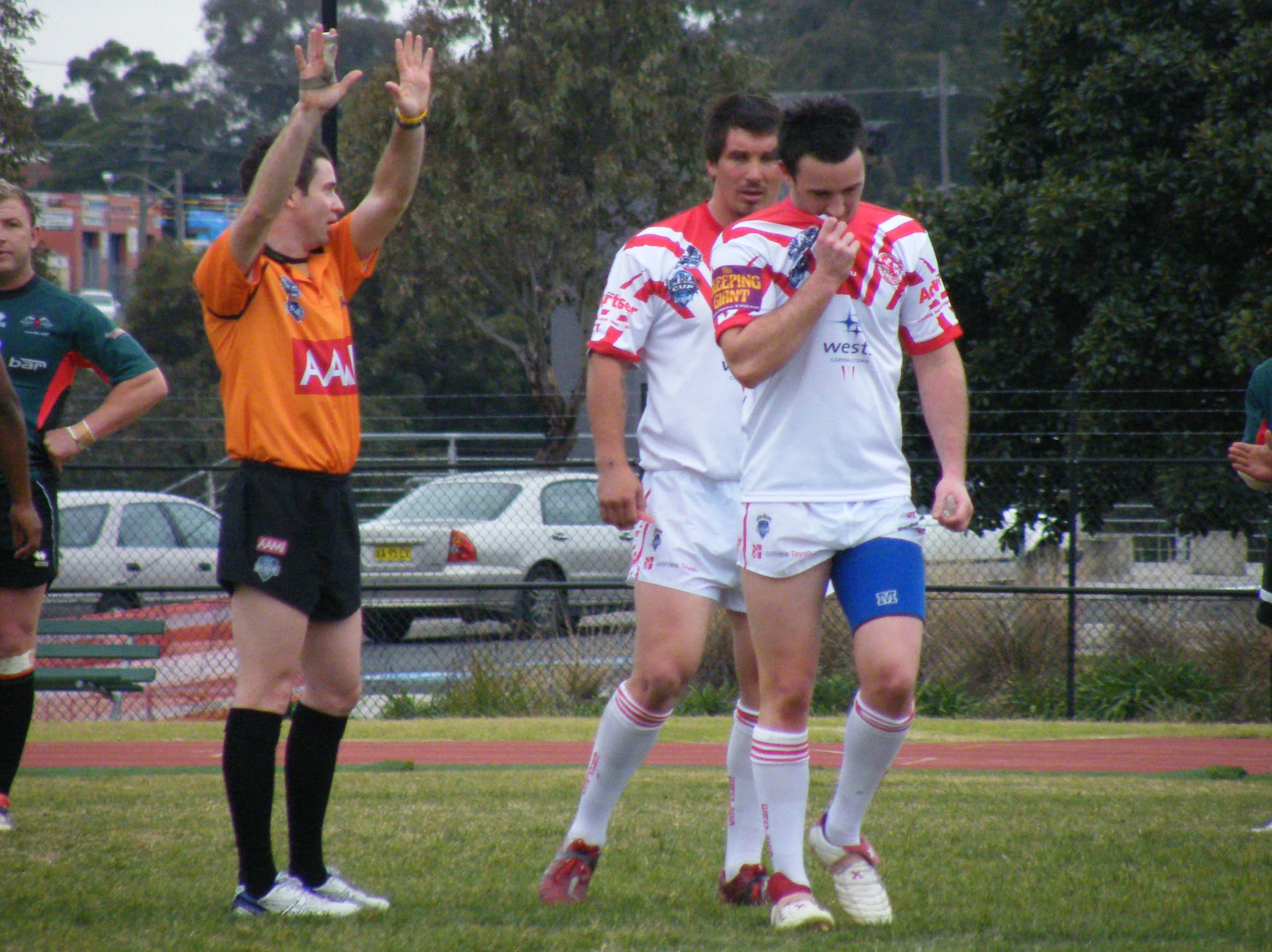
A rugby league referee giving a "sin bin" ruling, signifying the ten minutes that the offender must spend off the field.

The standard disciplinary sanction in rugby league is the penalty. The referee may also award a penalty try, which is described in the section on scoring.

If a team that has been penalised commits another offence (often by expressing dissent against the referee's decision), the referee may advance the position of the penalty 10 metres towards the offending team's goal line, and may also sin bin (temporary expulsion) or send off (permanent expulsion) the offending player(s). A rarely known law of Rugby League however is that a player may receive multiple yellow cards in a game and not receive a red card.

In the United Kingdom, the referee uses penalty cards to signal a sin-binning (yellow card) and a sending-off (red card). In games played in the southern hemisphere, the referee raises both arms straight out with fingers spread (to indicate 10 minutes) for a temporary expulsion and simply points sent-off players from the field of play.

== Tactics ==
The defensive team and attacking team carry out any number of tactics, within the rules, to achieve their short term and ultimately long-term objectives. The tactics below are a basic guide to how the game is typically played. On occasions, enterprising teams may choose to deviate from the typical tactics to surprise their opponents.

=== Attacking tactics ===
==== Improving field position ====
Field position is crucial in rugby league.

===== Ball running =====
Usually when inside their own half of the field, an attacking team will use low-risk plays to attempt to gain metres while avoiding turning over possession.

===== Hit-up =====
Australia's Joel Clinton "hitting the ball up", i.e. running with it straight at the defence.

Also known as a drive, this is the act of taking a pass from the dummy half and running straight into the opposition's defensive line without looking to pass. Hit-ups are usually employed to gain low-risk metres early in the tackle-count, but a good hit-up can also result in a breach of the defensive line. It also tires defenders, who have to stop an on-rushing opponent by putting their bodies on the line. Defending players may be drawn in towards the player hitting the ball up in an effort to make a tackle, possibly leaving other parts of the defensive line weakened for other attackers should the ball-carrier manage to off-load the ball to a teammate. Forwards are usually used for taking hit-ups because of their greater size (often over 100 kg) and strength, although most players on a team will take some hit-ups during a match. Most sets of 6 usually involve at least one hit-up to build a position from which to attack. A set of five hit-ups and a kick is known as one-out rugby,

===== Dummy-half Scoot =====
An alternative to a hit-up is for the player in the dummy half (acting-halfback) position to run the ball himself, without passing. This is often performed by quicker players as they are able to round the markers and make ground for their side. Some teams use repeated dummy half scoots with the intention of playing the ball quickly and catching defenders before they are able to properly position themselves. This is known as quick ball or 'getting a roll on'.

===== Kicking =====
- Kicks in play can, if successful, result in rapid field advancement. Towards the end of the tackle count, the ball will often find its way to the best kicker on the team who will then return possession of the ball to the other side in the most favourable position for his team by kicking it down to the other end. These kicks are sometimes intended to go into touch (leave the field of play), resulting in a scrum to restart play. Scrums take a while to form, so this gives the attacking team a chance for a short rest before play resumes.
- Following a defensive penalty, a team with possession may gain field position by kicking for touch, that is, by kicking the ball on the full over either of the touch lines. Unlike Rugby Union, which brings the ball back into play with a line-out, the team with possession retains the ball by putting the ball back in play with a tap, in line from where the ball crossed the touch line. This also gives that team a new set of six tackles.
- The 40/20 rule is a relatively new rule created to reward excellence in kicking for touch. When a player on the attacking team kicks the ball from behind his 40-metre line and it goes into touch between the opposition's 20-metre line and goal-line after bouncing at least once within the field of play, a 40/20 is awarded. The usual decision to give the head and feed of the scrum to the non-kicking team when the ball enters touch is reversed if the kick is a 40/20. As scrums are rarely competitive, a successful 40/20 virtually guarantees possession in an attacking position by effectively moving the team from their own 40-metre line to the position where the ball went out.

==== Breaching the defence ====
In addition to trying to break the defensive line with the sheer force of a hit-up, players attempt to breach the opposing team's defence through combinations of plays, using speed, passing and/or kicking.

===== Ball Running =====
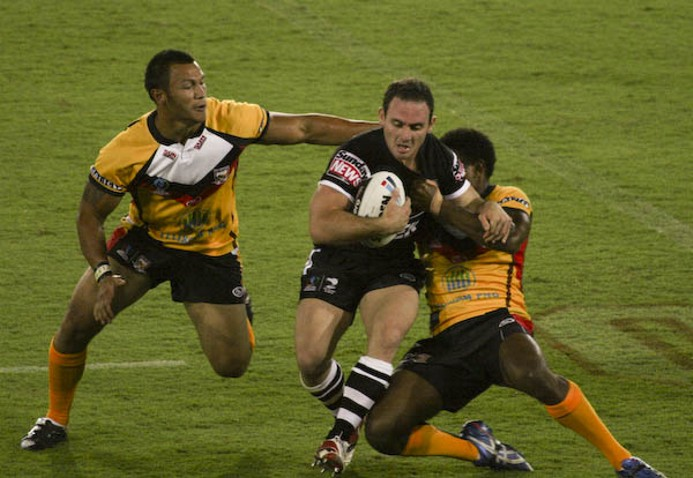
Lance Hohaia attempts to breach the defence.

- Most rugby league tries result from back-line movements which involve deft passing between attacking players to move the ball out quickly to the wings or centres. If the ball movement is quicker than the defensive line's ability to shift to cover the outer attackers, resulting spaces towards the side of the field give opportunities for the faster wingers and centres to score out wide.
- The most skilful forwards will, during a hit-up, look to release the ball to a supporting player before the tackle is completed, known as an off-load. The hit-up, if successful, should create spaces in the defensive line due to defending players having been drawn into the tackle. This creates opportunities for the supporting players to breach the defensive line while the defence is busy trying to contain the initial hit-up.
- A 'dummy' is a move in which the player with the ball pretends to pass to a teammate, but retains the ball and continues to run with it. The aim of this move is to take advantage of defenders that like to rush up on players who are about to receive the ball. This in effect draws the defending player(s) into the 'supposed' receiver of the ball leaving the player with the ball, unmarked.
- Generally, defensive players are assigned a player (or rather a position) which they must account for in defence. Manoeuvres by players on the attacking team are sometimes aimed at foiling this defensive system. A 'run-around' occurs when player A passes the ball to player B, and then circles behind him to receive the ball again from him. This play is designed to take advantage of those defenders who will follow the 'player' and not the 'position' thus luring one or many defenders out of their respective positions in the defensive line, leaving the defensive line punctuated by gaps. The defending team must try to move laterally with the ball across the field to ensure all attacking players remain marked.
- A 'face-ball', 'second man play' or 'cut-out pass' is a pass that travels through the air in front of one or more attacking players (who do not catch it) to another player farther down the line. Defenders may mistakenly focus on the next player in the attacking line, who does not receive the ball, potentially leaving the actual ball-receiver unmarked.

===== Kicking =====
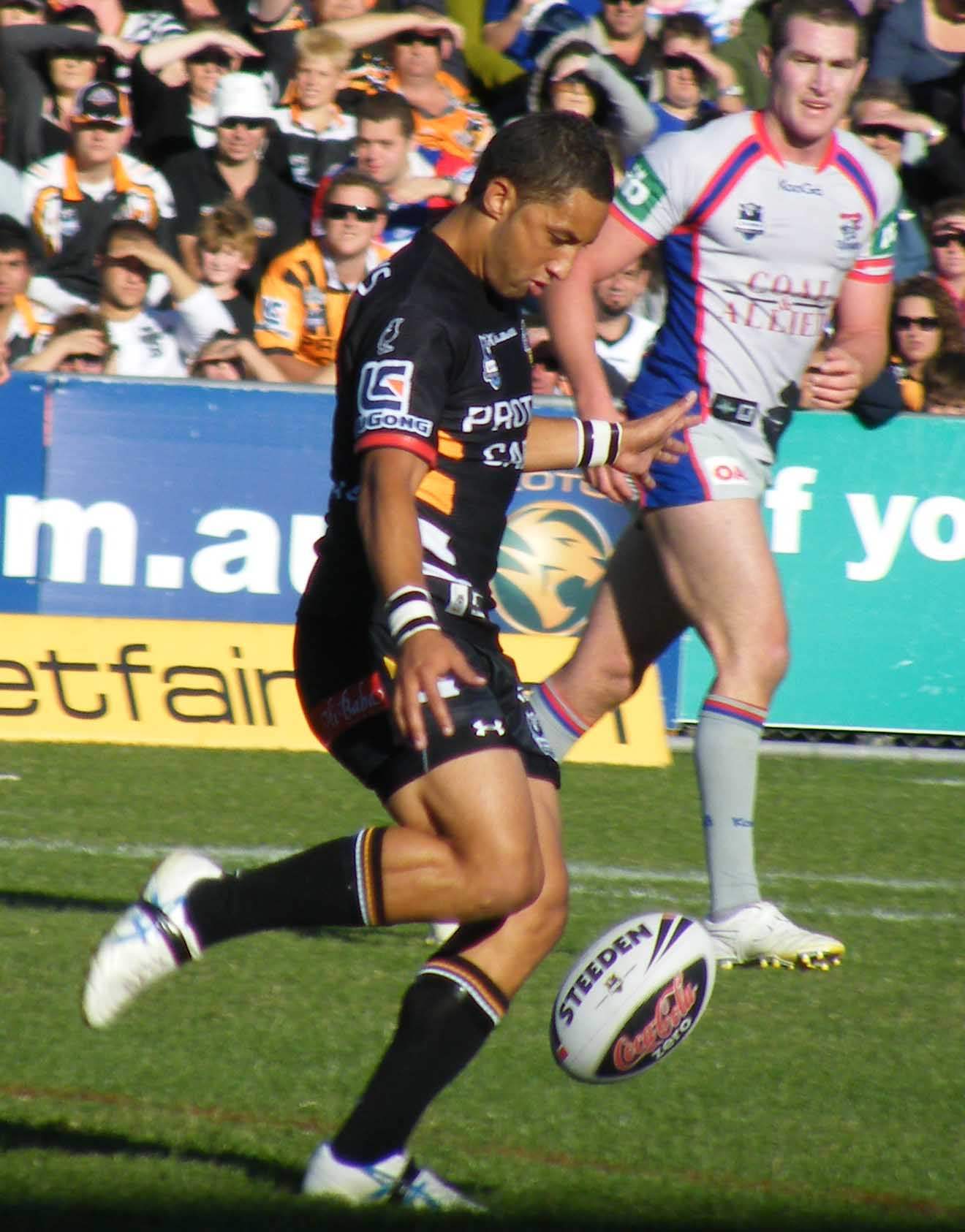
Benji Marshall performing an attacking kick in general play.

- A chip kick can be used to put the ball behind the defensive line so that either the kicker himself or a teammate can chase or regather it. Sometimes the kicker himself will attempt to regather after an extremely short chip kick over or past the defenders whilst running towards them. Upon kicking, a player is deemed to have relinquished possession of the ball and thus may not be tackled or interfered with by the defence. The kicker's already-existing momentum as he runs towards the opposition's in goal area gives him an advantage over defenders who must turn and chase. However this chip and regather is risky as it is difficult to perform successfully and good defending fullbacks will usually be lurking behind the defensive line, waiting for just this type of kick.
- The grubber is more commonly used in a similar play. The grubber kick is commonly performed when close to the in-goal area; the grubber kick causes the ball to roll along the ground which at times, makes the ball jump up into a perfect catching position, easier than catching a punt or other kick. The rolling on the ground gives chasers more opportunities to regather the ball, rather than waiting for the ball to fall back to earth. The rolling also slows down the ball, allowing the kicker to place the kick so that it comes to rest inside the in-goal area. There are many variants of the Grubber, each with its own qualities:

The End over End Grubber - as the name suggests, the ball is kicked from the point of the ball causing it to roll end over end. It is usually employed as an angled kick into the in-goal area as this method provides the greatest speed and distance on the ball, it also causes the ball to bounce more making it easier for attackers to regain the ball. The main drawback, due to the speed and bounce, is if the ball is kicked too hard it can go dead-in-goal, giving the opposition a 20m restart.

The Belly Grubber - as the name suggests, this variant is the polar opposite of the end over end where the Belly of the ball is kicked producing more of a soccer ball style roll which is a lot slower and minimal in bounce. Its usage is more conservative and is generally designed to trap defenders in-goal, forcing a goal-line dropout.

The Dink - similar to the Belly Roll, the ball is dropped on the foot with minimal pressure and is designed to travel a very short distance, no more than a few metres. It is usually employed by acting Dummy halves from the play-the-ball to fool charging defenders.

The Banana Grubber - similar to the end over end Grubber, the main difference being the point of the ball is kicked in a sideways fashion causing the ball to spin erratically across field. Its usage is minimal as it is generally considered a low percentage play.

Goal Post Grubber - any variant of the Grubber is employed in this method with the target line being the goal Post or thereabouts, with the intent of bamboozling defenders, especially with ricochets off the goal post padding.

- The bomb (or up and under or Garryowen) is a kick that goes high into the air. Both teams watch and wait for the ball to come down, and both teams usually having an equal chance at regathering it.

The Cage Kick - is a conservative variant of the bomb that is targeted at a receiving defender close to their own Goal-line, with the intent of easily tackling the receiver by well placed onside chasers, forcing the receiving team to resume possession deep in their half of the field with minimal return metres conceded.

The Swirling Bomb - is when the kicker attempts to impart the least amount of rotation on an extremely high kick causing the ball to float and swirl, making it very difficult for receivers to catch the ball cleanly. Often the ball is left to bounce causing unpredictable results. The main drawback to this method is the kicker generally requires a deeper pass to allow them more time to set the ball correctly before kicking it which often puts attackers offside precluding then from legal involvement.

=== Defensive tactics ===
When a side is defending they must prevent metres lost. They must defend against ball runners and kickers.

==== Defending against ball running ====
===== Preventing metres lost =====
- The easiest way to do this is to select the largest players from the team to do most of the tackling; a larger tackler will force back an attacking player much easier than a smaller tackler.
- In preventing metres lost it is also important to 'wrap up the ball' to prevent the attacking player who is currently hitting the ball up from offloading. Offloading causes second phase play.

===== Preventing line breaks =====
Defending players aim to spread across the field in a single line and stop the attacking players from breaking this line. The 'Slide Defence' and the 'Umbrella Defence' tactics aim to curb the number of breaks in the line.

- The 'sliding defence' requires that gaps are left at either edge of the field at the end of the defensive line, which aims to squeeze more players around the area of play. This allows the line to be at its strongest around the position of play, thus leaving the attacking side less opportunity to run through the line. Should the attacking side move the ball towards one edge of the field in an attempt to go around the defensive line, then the entire defensive line will move in that direction; this is known as sliding. Because defenders remain on the inside shoulder of attacking players, slide defence effectively uses the touch line as an extra defender. One of the main disadvantages of sliding defence is that it gives the attacking team more time and space with the ball.
- The 'umbrella defence' (or 'up and in' defence) requires that players do not spread across the entire field. The defensive line is particularly vulnerable on the edges around the wings, therefore the best defensive measure in this case is a preventative measure. That is, the aim becomes to prevent the attacking team from going to the wings or to disrupt any passes towards the edge of the field. This requires that defensive players (wingers or centres) on the edge of the defensive line move up faster than those in the middle of the line. Umbrella defence is a key tactic for defending against attacking plays close to the goal line, when it can be necessary to quickly shut down attacking players' time and space with the ball.

==== Defending against kicks ====
An attacking side may kick the ball through or over the defensive line of players. The defence must defend against kicks in the normal field of play and in the in-goal area.

===== Defending the field of play =====
- Late in the tackle count, when the attacking side is more likely to kick, the fullback and wingers drop back towards the defending team's in-goal area. As the name suggests, the fullback covers the end of the field and in-goal area whilst the wingers cover the edges of the field and the area between the defensive line and the fullback. A kick to the corner can be more efficiently fielded by a winger than by pulling the fullback out of position, while a long kick to the end of the field is best taken by the fullback. The use of the fullback and wingers to defend against potential kicks allows the other rear defenders to become available to receive a pass as their side receives the ball and begins its set.
- While the backs prepare to receive a kick, the other defenders will attempt to apply pressure to the kicker. It is usually rather predictable when a side is about to kick: normally one member of the attacking team is in charge of kicking, and as the team prepares to kick, he will drop back and make himself available deep behind the dummy half, to give himself space and time to set up for the kick. To limit the kicker's effectiveness, the defenders will often rush up out of the defensive line towards him. As well as giving him less time to set up, this action can cloud the kicker's mind, distracting him with thoughts of the upcoming tackle or encouraging him to consider switching to another attacking option due to the sudden change in the defensive line. This combination of physical and mental pressure may lead to a poor kick, giving an advantage to the non-kicking team. This manoeuvre could also result in a 'charge-down', if a defending player manages to get in the way of the ball very shortly after it is kicked (If the ball travels forward this is an exception to the knock-on rule). This often results in a line break or try to the previously defending team, however it runs the risk of having the attacking team regather the ball for a new set of tackles.

===== Defending the in-goal area =====
- If the ball is caught on the full by a defender standing in the in-goal area, play halts and possession is awarded to the catcher's team, with play to restart twenty metres from the in-goal area. This is aimed to penalise the attacking team for a poor kick that was easily fielded by the opposition full back whilst awarding the defending team who were skilled enough to field the kick.
- A defender will shadow the ball over the touch line to prevent an attacking team member from getting into a position to ground the ball. It is most likely a ball may be heading to touch off a kick from the attacking side. On this occasion, the roles of each team are reversed, where the attacking team becomes the defending and vice versa.
- Grounding the ball in-goal or putting the ball into touch are considered last-ditch defensive techniques that prevent the attacking side from scoring. These two moves effectively force a stoppage of play, which means the opposition cannot score. Both of these measures result in a goal-line drop-out, meaning the attacking team retains possession of the ball. Thus, even if an attacking team is unable to score they can regain another set of chances to score by forcing the defending team to perform either of the above two moves, accomplished by placing a kick into the in-goal area.

==== Turning defence into attack ====
It is commonly said that the best form of defence is attack. A defensive team in rugby league can gain possession of the ball at any stage during an attacking teams set.

- The one-on-one strip is performed by a defender on an attacking player when that defender is the only person involved in the tackle. A player is ruled to be in the tackle if he/she is currently holding onto or has only just recently let go of the attacking player. The strip itself is the act of taking the ball from the arms of an attacking player, thus gaining possession for the defending team (who becomes the attacking team).
- An intercept is performed by a defending player coming out of the defensive line in anticipation of a pass that can be prevented from reaching its targeted player. An intercept usually ends in a try because in achieving the interception, the player has passed through the opposition's line of players. The interceptor may or may not have a full back to evade. Speed is a great asset in assuring the interceptor scores a try.
- During a tackle, the defensive team may force the attacking player 'into touch' while he's in possession of the ball. As it is illegal for any part of a player in possession of the ball's body touching the ground outside the field of play, this results in a stoppage of play. Play restarts via a scrum with the head and feed going to the defensive team that forced the attacking player into touch.
- Lastly, strong tackles using the size and speed of a defending player can force the ball loose from the impact. The defensive side shall only win a scrum if the ball comes forward out of the tackle towards the in-goal area, (consisting of a knock-on) otherwise the first team to pick up the ball wins possession. Forwards are more effective at this play than the backs because of their size, but it is not unknown for backs to force a ball loose in this manner.

=== Handover ===
Late in the tackle count the attacking side will start to think defensively in anticipation of a handover, also known as a changeover or turnover. That is, whilst most kicks performed at this time will be primarily for attacking purposes, there is always a defensive element to consider. The attacking team uses these tactics to put themselves in the better defensive position when their set of six ends at the 'change over'.

The attacking team uses the bomb in attack, but this attack can quickly turn to defensive if the bomb is fielded by the opposition team. Therefore, there is a defensive element in deciding whether to kick a bomb. A bomb is useful defensively because even if it is fielded by the opposition, it is still useful in giving the kicking team ample time to get as close as possible to the player with the ball which allows the kicking team to prevent the opposing team from making too much ground towards their in goal area.

At the end of an attacking team's set of six, the attacking team may wish to kick (grubber or chip kick) the ball in to touch and give the opposition a scrum feed. This is aimed at slowing down play, which gives the players a rest and allows them to set up a good defensive position.

- Kicking into touch gives a scrum to the opposing team, which is better than the alternative; that being the opposing team regathering the ball and forcing the newly defensive side to make the tackle. Thus, putting the ball into touch makes the newly attacking team play from a non-running position, as far away from their in-goal area as possible.
- The grubber is used in this manner to prevent the opposing team from trying to regather the ball or to force a mistake if they do try. A grubber also ensures that the ball will fall in the field of play before going in to touch, which would result in a penalty otherwise. A punt in this situation is placed as close to the out of field line as possible, which gives the opposition little chances to regather.

== See also ==
- Rugby league positions
- Rugby league match officials
- Rugby league scrum
- Comparison of American football and rugby league
- Comparison of Canadian football and rugby league
- Comparison of rugby league and rugby union
- Rugby union gameplay
