= Glossary of rugby union terms =

Overview of rugby union terms

Rugby union is a team sport played between two teams of fifteen (15) players.

This is a general glossary of the terminology used in the sport of rugby union. Where words in a sentence are also defined elsewhere in this article, they appear in italics.

== 0-9 ==
22
The 22-metre line, marking 22 metres (72 ft) from the tryline.

50-22
The 50:22 is a kicking law in which a player in possession kicks the ball from inside their own half (the 50), and it bounces in the field of play before going out (into touch) inside the opponent's 22-metre area. The kicking team is then rewarded with the throw into the resulting lineout. The 50:22 law was introduced in 2021 after being trialed in the Super Rugby AU.

89
An "89" or eight-nine move is a phase following a scrum, in which the number 8 picks up the ball and transfers it to number 9 (scrum-half).

99
The "99" call was a policy of simultaneous retaliation by the 1974 British Lions tour to South Africa, (the 99 comes from the British emergency services telephone number which is 999). The tour was marred by on-pitch violence, which the match officials did not adequately control and the relative absence of cameras compared to the modern game made citing and punishment after the fact unlikely. The Lions' captain, Willie John McBride (Ireland), therefore instigated a policy of "one in, all in" - that is, when one Lions player retaliated, all other Lions were expected to join in the melee or hit the nearest Springbok. By doing so, the referee would be unable to identify any single instigator, and so would be left with the choice of sending off all or none of the team. In this respect, the "99" call was extremely successful - no Lions player was sent off during the tour.

== A ==
Accidental offside
see Offside

Advantage
"Advantage" is the period of time after an infringement in which the non-offending side have the opportunity to gain sufficient territory or tactical opportunity to negate the need to stop the game due to the infringement. The referee will signal advantage with their arm out horizontally toward the non-infringing team. If no tactical or territorial advantage is gained, the referee will whistle and give the decision that had been delayed. If sufficient advantage is gained, the referee will call "advantage over", and play will continue. The Advantage Law allows the game to flow more freely, and not stop for every minor infringement, giving no incentive for a player to commit "intentional" fouls.

An example of the application of advantage would be if Team A knocked the ball on (technical offence, conceding a scrum) but a Team B player picked the ball up and made a run forwards before being tackled.

Advantage line
Also called the gain line. It is an imaginary line drawn across the centre of the pitch when there is a breakdown in open play, such as a ruck, maul or scrum. Advancing across the gain line represents a gain in territory.

Alickadoo
A non-player associated with a rugby game or club, especially a committee member or administrative official. May perform various off-field roles, particularly on a match day.

Ankle tap
An ankle-tap or tap-tackle is a form of tackle. It is used when the player carrying the ball is running at speed and a defending player is approaching from behind. Even if the defender is not able to get close enough to the ball-carrier to wrap their arms around them in a conventional tackle, they may still be able to dive at the other player's feet and, with outstretched arm, deliver a tap or hook to the player's foot (or feet) causing the player to stumble.

== B ==
Ball back
If the ball enters touch, then play is restarted by a line-out at the point where the ball left the field of play. The exception to this is if the ball is kicked into touch on the full. In this case, a line-out is taken at the point from where the ball was kicked, and not from where it entered touch.
Ball back is waived in certain circumstances:
- If the kicking player is inside his own 22m line when he receives and then kicks the ball.
- If the player receives the ball outside the 22, then retreats back into the 22 and kicks into touch on the full. This would result in a lineout at the nearest point on the touchline from where the ball was kicked.
- If a side elects to kick a penalty into touch.

Bill
Australian name given to the (William Webb Ellis) Webb Ellis Cup.

Black dot
A mark in the centre of the crossbar connecting the goal posts, usually black in colour, used as an aid to kickers with their aiming. A player scoring a try in the centre of the goal line, that is beneath the posts, can be said to have scored "under the black dot".

Blindside
The narrow side of the pitch in relation to a scrum or a breakdown in play; it is the opposite of openside. The blindside flanker is expected to cover the opposing team blindside at scrum and breakdown.

The blindside of the scrum is the side that the opposing scrum half is feeding the ball from. The open side is the other side. Open in this situation means unimpeded.

Blitz defence
The blitz defence is a defensive technique similar to the defence used in rugby league. It relies on the whole defensive line moving forward towards their marked man as one, as soon as the ball leaves the base of a ruck or maul. The charge is usually led by the inside centre.

The idea of this technique is to prevent the attacking team gaining any ground by tackling them behind the gain line and forcing interceptions and charged down kicks. However, the defending team can be vulnerable to chip kicks and any player breaking the defensive line will have much space to play because the defence are running the other way and must stop, turn and chase.

Blood bin
It is also called blood replacement or blood sub(stitution). A player who has a visible bleeding injury may be replaced for up to fifteen minutes (running time, not game time), during which he or she may receive first-aid treatment to stop the flow of blood and dress the wound. The player may then return to the pitch to continue playing.

Bonus points
Bonus points are a method of deciding table points from a rugby union match. It was implemented in order to encourage attacking play throughout a match, to discourage repetitive goal-kicking, and to reward teams for "coming close" in losing efforts.
- Under the standard system, 1 bonus point is awarded for scoring 4 (or more) tries and 1 bonus point for losing by 7 points (or fewer).
- The French professional league replaces the four-try bonus point with a point for a win in which the winning team scores at least 3 more tries than its opponent. In addition, the "losing" bonus point requires a margin of defeat of 5 or fewer points.

- Australia's National Rugby Championship uses the same system as France, except that a losing bonus point is awarded if the margin of defeat is 8 points or fewer.

Box-kick
This is a kick taken from behind a scrum, normally by the scrum-half, in which he turns away from the scrum facing the touchline, and kicks the ball back over the scrum into the clear "box" of space behind the opposition to allow his own team to chase through and regain the ball in undefended territory.

Breakdown
The breakdown is a colloquial term for the short period of open play immediately after a tackle and before and during the ensuing ruck. During this time teams compete for possession of the ball, initially with their hands and then using feet in the ruck. Most referees will call "ruck" or "hands away" as soon as the ruck is formed. Most infringements take place at the breakdown, owing to the greater variety of possible offences at a breakdown, for example handling in the ruck, killing the ball, offside at the ruck, and so on.

== C ==
Caution
A player who deliberately or repeatedly infringes the laws is cautioned, and shown a yellow card. A cautioned player is suspended from playing for ten minutes.

Cavalry charge
Typically during a penalty kick or free kick, the attacking players form a line behind their kicker. When signaled, they charge forward. The kicker then tap-kicks the ball and passes to one of the players behind. This move is explicitly forbidden under 10.4(p) and the penalty is a penalty kick.

Centre
They are the players wearing shirts numbers 12 & 13. They are divided into inside and outside centre. The inside centre is also known as the second five-eighths in New Zealand.

Charge-down
When a player makes a defensive clearance kick, but it hits an opponent who has run towards him in an attempt to block it, it is known as a charge-down. These can be good try-scoring opportunities.

Choke tackle
Tackle in which the tackler tries to keep the ball carrier on their feet and push them backwards before taking them to the ground. This is harder to execute but gives the tackler's side a gain in territory.

Cibi
The cibi is a Fijian war dance performed by the Fiji national team before each of their international matches.

Colts
Men's youth rugby players, generally with an upper age limit of 21 years, may be referred to as colts. In some instances the age limit may be as high as 23, but this is uncommon.

A competition for players below the age of 19, for example, may be known as Under-19 Colts. The term is usually not applied to secondary school teams; most colts players have completed their high school years.

Conversion
If a team scores a try, they have an opportunity to "convert" it for two further points by kicking the ball through the goal - that is, between the posts and above the crossbar. The kick is taken at any point on the field of play in line with the point that the ball was grounded for the try, parallel to the touch-lines. So it is advantageous to score a try nearer to the posts as it is easier to convert it.

In the 15-player game, the kick can be either a drop kick or a place kick. However, in sevens, all conversions must be drop kicks.

Counter rucking
If a team (usually the team that took the ball into contact) has secured the ball at a ruck, and the other team manage to force them off the ball and secure possession themselves, the defending team are said to have "counter-rucked"

Crash ball
It is an attacking tactic where a player receives a pass at pace and runs directly at the opposition's defensive line. The crash ball runner attempts to commit two or more opposing players to the tackle, then attempts to make the ball available to teammates by off-loading in the tackle or recycling the ball quickly from the ruck.

By committing players to the tackle, the crash ball runner creates holes in the opposition's defense, thereby creating attacking opportunities for teammates.

Crash tackle
Another name for the crash ball as mentioned above.

Cross-Field Kick
A kick which goes from one side of the field to the other and is kicked very high, usually resulting in an aerial battle between an attacker and defender to catch it. This is usually used near the defending team's try-line, often with the catch happening in the in-goal area itself. Most often used when the kicker knows the referee is playing advantage and his team will get a penalty if the kick fails - this is because the kick itself is very risky and likely to result in an interception.

== D ==
Drift defence
The drift defence is a defensive technique that forces the attacking side into an ever-shrinking pocket near to the touchline. It operates by the defensive side moving forward and diagonally following the path of the attacking side's ball movements. If used successfully the ball will usually end up in the attacking winger's hands near the line of touch. This player would then find themselves surrounded on one side by a defending outside centre, with the opposing winger opposite and the touchline on his other side. This will prevent a cut-back and allows the Touchline to act as a 16th player. Its disadvantage is that if the attacking team are strong enough to break through the pocket tackle the defending team will have no players spare to cover a breakout.

Drop goal
A drop goal is scored when a player kicks the ball from hand through the opposition's goal, but the ball must touch the ground between being dropped and kicked. It is worth three points.

The team awarded a free kick cannot score a dropped goal until the ball next becomes dead, or until an opponent has played or touched it, or has tackled the ball carrier. This restriction applies also to a scrum taken instead of a free kick.

Drop kick
A drop kick is when a player kicks the ball from hand and the ball touches the ground between being dropped and kicked. If a drop kick goes through a goal then it results in a drop goal.

Dummy pass
An offensive ruse, where the ball carrier moves as if to pass the ball to a teammate, but then continues to run with the ball themselves; the objective is to trick defenders into marking the would-be pass receiver, creating a gap for the ball carrier to run into. If it is successful, the player is said to have "sold the dummy".

Dummy runner
Another offensive tactic; a player on the attacking team runs towards the opposition as if running onto a pass, only for the ball to be passed to another player, carried on by the ball carrier or kicked forwards. As with a dummy pass, this tactic draws defenders away from the ball and creates space for the attacking team

Dump tackle
It is a tackling technique. The tackler wraps their arms around the ball carrier's thighs and lifts them a short distance in the air before forcibly driving them to the ground. The tackler must go to ground with the ball carrier for the tackle to be legal. This technique is useful to completely stop the opponent in their tracks. A dump tackle that drops the ball carrier on their head or neck is known as a spear tackle, and will almost invariably concede a penalty and possibly result in a caution for the tackler. In rugby union, World Rugby has ruled that a dangerous tackle of this type, sometimes also called a tip tackle, should be punished with a straight red card.

== E ==
Eightman, Eighth-man
Alternative name for the Number 8

== F ==
Five metre scrum, Scrum-five
When a scrum offence is committed within 5 m of either try line, or in the in-goal area, the referee will award a scrum on the five metre line; this is to prevent all but the most brutal packs from driving the ball over the try line within the scrum.

Fend or "hand off"
Fending is the action by the ball carrier of repelling a tackler using his arm. For the action to be legal, the ball carrier's arm must be straight before contact is made; a shove or "straight-arm smash", where the arm is extended immediately before contact or on contact, is illegal and classed as dangerous play.

First XV or First fifteen
The preferred starting line-up of a team – more colloquially, the senior team of any club.

Flanker
Also known as breakaways or wing forwards. They are the players wearing shirts numbers 6 & 7. They are the players with the fewest set responsibilities. The player should have all round attributes: speed, strength, fitness, tackling and handling skills. Flankers are always involved in the game, as they are the real ball winners at the breakdown, especially the number 7. The two flankers do not usually bind to the scrum in a fixed position. Instead, the openside flanker will attach to the scrum on whichever side is further from the nearer touchline, while the blindside flanker attaches himself to the scrum on the side closer to the touchline.

Fly half or five-eighth
Referred to by a number of different names, including first five-eighth in New Zealand, this player wears shirt number 10. They are the back-line player most likely to be passed the ball from the scrum-half or half-back, and therefore make many key tactical decisions during a game. Often this player is also the goal kicker as the position requires excellent kicking skills.

Forward pass
It is called a throw-forward in the laws of the game.

A forward pass occurs when the ball fails to travel backwards in a pass. If the ball is not thrown or passed forward but it bounces forward after hitting a player or the ground, it is not a throw-forward.

If the referee deems it accidental, this results in a scrum to the opposing team; however deliberate forward passes result in the award of a penalty.

Foul play
Foul play is defined as the deliberate infringement of the laws of the game.

Fourth official
A fourth official is one who controls replacements and substitutes. They may also substitute for referee or touch judge in case of injury to either of them.

Free-kick
Also called short arm penalty. This is a lesser form of the penalty, usually awarded to a team for a technical offence committed by the opposing side such as numbers at the line-out or time wasting at a scrum. A free kick is also awarded for calling a mark.

A team cannot kick for goal and the normal 22m rule applies for kicking for position from a free kick. A free-kick is signalled by the referee with a bent arm raised in the air.

Full-back
They are the player wearing jersey number 15. They act as the last line of defence against running attacks by the opposing three-quarter backs. The full-back is expected to field high kicks from the opposition, and reply with a superior kick or a counter-attack. The full back is sometimes the specialist goal-kicker in a team, taking penalty and conversion kicks.

Full house
Scoring a try, conversion, penalty and drop goal in the same match.

== G ==
Gain line
The gain line is an imaginary line drawn across the centre of the pitch when there is a breakdown in open play, such as a ruck, maul or scrum. Advancing across the gain line represents a gain in territory.

Garryowen
A Garryowen, or up-and-under kick, is a high short punt onto or behind the defending team.

Goal
A goal is scored when a player kicks the ball through the plane bounded by the two uprights and above the crossbar. A drop goal or penalty goal count for 3 points and conversions count for two.

Goal from mark
Goal from mark is an antiquated method of scoring. It occurred when a player "marked" and scored a goal from there. In the modern game, a goal cannot be scored from a free kick, but in the past the reward for scoring a "goal from mark" (which is a difficult kick to play) was three or four points. Occasionally referred to as a field goal.

Goal line, Tryline
Two solid, straight white lines (one at each end) stretching across the entire width of the pitch passing directly through the goal posts which defines the boundary between the "field of play" and the "in-goal". As the goal line is defined as part of the "in-goal", attacking players can score tries by placing the ball with downward pressure onto the goal line itself. The base of the goal posts and post protectors are also defined to be part of the goal line.

The goal line is often referred to as the "try line" though that term does not appear in the Laws of the Game.

Goose Step
A goose step, made famous by Australian David Campese but now performed by many players, is a running technique where the player slows down and takes a small 'hop' into the air before sprinting off - sometimes in a different direction - upon landing. Its purpose is to confuse the defender, who is often unable to predict the sudden change of pace and direction.

Group of death
Is an informal sobriquet used to describe a situation that often occurs during the group stage of a tournament, where either (1) any team in the group could qualify and any team could be eliminated, or (2) more teams have a legitimate chance to advance to the next stage than allowed by the tournament structure.

Typically, a group of death will see an unusual match-up of heavyweight sides, due to a quirk in the seeding system.

Grubber kick
It is a type of kick that makes the ball roll and tumble across the ground, producing irregular bounces making it hard for the defending team to pick up the ball without causing a knock-on. It gives the ball both high and low bounce and on occasions, the ball can sit up in a perfect catching position.

== H ==
Half-back
Can refer to either the scrum-half or fly-half, but in New Zealand is exclusively used to describe the scrum-half.

Haka
The haka is a traditional Māori dance performed by New Zealand national teams, most famously the All Blacks, prior to international matches. It serves as a challenge to the opposing team.

Hand-off
Handing off (also called fend) is the action by the ball carrier of repelling a tackler using his arm. For the action to be legal, the ball carrier's arm must be straight before contact is made; a shove or "straight-arm smash", where the arm is extended immediately before contact or on contact, is illegal and classed as dangerous play.

High tackle
A high tackle (or head-high tackle) is a form of tackle where the tackler grasps the ball carrier above the line of the shoulders, most commonly around the neck or at the line of the chin and jaw. Executed violently or at speed, a high tackle is potentially dangerous, so are often not just sanctioned with a penalty, but also a yellow or red card.

Hooker
Hookers traditionally wear the number 2 shirt. The hooker is the player who is in the centre position of the front row of the scrum and who uses their feet to 'hook' the ball back. Due to the pressure put on the body by the scrum and the requirement to use both arms to bind to other players (and hence having no free arm to use to support or deflect bodyweight) it is considered to be one of the most dangerous positions to play.

Hookers normally throw the ball in at line-outs, partly because they are normally the shortest of the forwards, but more often because they are the most skillful of the forwards.

Hospital pass
Any pass that is made which has the inevitable, unavoidable consequence of the receiver being tackled. This is because the receiver has already been marked and the opposing player is bearing down on the receiver so rapidly that, as soon as the ball is caught, the opposing player smashes into the receiver. Generally made in times of panic or when there is no one else available, it is called the hospital pass because of the inevitability of a hard tackle.

== I ==
Interception
The gaining of possession by running forward from the defensive line and taking a pass meant for a member of the opposition. The result is similar to the result of a line break, and has a good chance of leading to a try.

== K ==
Kick-off
A coin is tossed and the winning captain either chooses which direction their team shall play, or elects to take the kick that starts the game. Both halves of the match are started with a drop kick from the centre-point of the halfway line. The kick must cross the opposition's 10-metre line, unless played by a member of the receiving team. The opposition are not allowed to encroach beyond the 10-metre line until the ball is kicked.

If the ball does not travel 10 metres, goes straight into touch, or goes over the dead ball line at the end of the pitch, the opposing team may accept the kick, have the ball kicked off again, or have a scrum at the centre.

After a score, the game is restarted from the same place under the same restrictions, with the conceding team drop-kicking the ball to the scoring team. However, in sevens, the scoring team kicks off.

Kick tennis
Style of play characterised by both teams repeatedly kicking from hand to the opposition, rather than running at the opposition and risking a turnover. So-called because the ball moves back and forth like in a tennis match. It is considered boring to watch and also referred to as aerial ping-pong.

Knock-on
Also called knock-forward. A knock-on occurs when the ball accidentally moves forward after coming into contact with the upper body of a player, and then touches either the ground or another player. It results in a scrum with the put-in to the opposition. If the ball is intentionally knocked forward it is deemed a deliberate knock-on; the opposition is rewarded with a penalty and the offending player is given a yellow card and sent to the sin bin.

== L ==
Latcher/Latching on
A latcher is a player who binds himself to the ballcarrier in open play in order to add his power and weight to an attempt to break the line and gain yards. If the defence is able to stop the ballcarrier and hold him up, a maul usually forms. However latching on does not automatically create a maul.

Late tackle
A late tackle is a tackle executed on a player who has already passed or kicked away the ball. As it is illegal to tackle a player who does not have the ball, late tackles are penalty offences (referees allow a short margin of error where the tackler was already committed to the tackle) and if severe or reckless may result in yellow or red Cards.

If a late tackle occurs after a kick and a penalty is awarded, the non-offending team has the option of taking the penalty where the ball landed.

Line break
Action by which the player with the ball gets through the opponent's defensive line without being tackled. If there is insufficient cover, or the player has support, line breaks can often lead to tries.

Line-out
A minimum of two players line up parallel with each other one metre apart between the five-metre and 15-metre lines. Usually, the hooker of the team in possession throws the ball in while his opposite number [may] stand in between the touchline and the five-metre line.

All players not involved in the lineout, except the receiver (usually the scrum-half) must retire 10 metres.

The ball must be thrown in straight down the middle of the lineout and the hooker must not cross into the field of play while throwing in. If the throw is not straight then the throw is given to the opposition or a scrum awarded.

Jumpers can be lifted by their teammates below the waist, but the opposition's jumpers must not be obstructed, barged or pulled down.

Line-out code
It is a coded piece of information, used to communicate intentions about a line-out within one team in a match without giving information away to the other team. The advantage in line-out comes from knowing in advance how the throw will be made.

Line speed
The speed with which a blitz defence closes down the opposing team. A high line speed will make it difficult for the opposition to cross the gain line.

Lock
Locks or second-row are the players wearing shirts number 4 & 5. Locks are very tall, athletic and have an excellent standing jump along with good strength. This makes them the primary targets at line-outs. They also make good ball carriers, bashing holes in the defence around the ruck and maul. They also have to push in the rucks and mauls.

Loose head
The loose head prop is the player who takes the left hand position on the front row of the scrum. A loose head prop traditionally wears the number 1 shirt.

As the loose head has considerable potential freedom of movement compared to other front row players, the loose head can attempt to play various illegal techniques to divert the push of the opposing pack and is often able to illegally interfere with the ball in the scrum using his free arm.

== M ==
Mark
A mark is the place where the game will restart after a stoppage, such as where a scrum-offence or penalty offence occurred, or on the touchline where the ball went out of play (or where the ball was kicked in the case of ball-back). Marks are generally defined by the referee, or the touch judge when the ball leaves play by the touchline.

Marks can also be defined by a defending player who executes a clean catch (catches the ball before it bounces or touches another player) of a ball kicked by an attacking player if the defender is standing within his/her own 22-metre zone or in-goal. To "call a mark", the player shouts "Mark!" as they catch the ball. The referee then awards that player a free kick which must be taken by that specific player. (If, for whatever reason, that player cannot take the kick, a scrum is awarded instead.) If the player is simply a poor kicker, they are likely to take a 'Tap Kick' and immediately pass the ball to the fly-half or full back who will generally deliver a clearance kick.

Marks can be called when the ball is cleanly caught following a kick by the opposition for any type of kick except a kick off or restart after a score. It is legal, though very unusual, to call a mark from a clean catch of a penalty kick.

Maul
When a ball carrier is held up (without being tackled) by both an opposing player and a player from their own team, a maul is then considered formed.

The offside line becomes the last foot of the last man on each side of the maul. Players can join in only from behind that teammate. Anyone who comes in from the sides will be penalised by the referee. Hands are allowed to be used in the maul. If either team deliberately collapses the maul then that side will be penalised by the referee. (Note that from August 1, 2008, the IRB is conducting a global trial of a modification of this Law which will allow players to deliberately collapse a maul providing the collapse is achieved by pulling from above the waist.)

If the ball does not come out in a timely fashion, the referee will award a scrum to the team that did not take the ball into the maul.

Mauls can only exist in the field of play. Play that looks like a maul can exist within the in-goal but restrictions on entry to the maul and the need to bind on to a team member do not apply.

Medical joker
A player signed by a professional club as an injury replacement. The term is directly borrowed from the French joker médical and is most commonly associated with France's top league; that country has long allowed such signings.

Mismatch
Situation where a back is one-on-one with a forward. This favours the attacking side, as often forwards are too slow to stop backs, and backs are too small to stop forwards.

Mulligrubber
The mulligrubber kick is a style of kicking. A mulligrubber is directed towards the ground and forced to bounce. Often used in situations where either the ball needs to be placed in a specific position (i.e. on the try line) or to intentionally stop the opponent from being able to catch the ball on the full.

== N ==
North
(to go north, to head north, etc.)

In the days prior to professionalism in rugby union, players would often convert to rugby league — which was a paid sport — thereby becoming ineligible to play rugby union again. In Wales and (to a lesser extent) England, the term "to go north" referred to this change of code, an allusion to the popularity of rugby league in the north of England.

Not straight
Referee's call when a line-out throw or the feeding of the ball into the scrum is unfairly towards the team in possession, preventing any contest for the ball. It is punished by resetting the set piece and giving control of the ball to the opposition.

Number 8
They are the players wearing shirts number 8. It is the only position that is known only by the shirt number. Number eights must have a good tactical awareness in order to coordinate scrums and ruck moves with the scrum-half. If the ball is at their feet at the back of a scrum, ruck or maul, it is normally the number eight's decision whether to pass the ball out or drive the breakdown on in order to make ground.

== O ==
Obstruction
Offence whereby a player deliberately impedes an opponent who does not have the ball.

Off-load pass (offload)
A short pass made by a player being tackled before they reach the ground, usually by turning to face a teammate and tossing the ball into the air for a teammate to catch.

Offside
A player is offside when they are forward of the relevant offside line i.e. between the relevant offside line and the opposing team's dead ball line.

In a match, most players will be offside several times but they only become liable for penalty if they do not act to attempt to become onside (which generally means retreat downfield) or attempt to interfere with play.

In open play, only the ball carrier's team (or the team that last carried or deliberately touched the ball) is bound by offside - the offside line for them is the ball. (Note every player who passes the ball backwards is offside and must attempt to retire.)

An accidental offside may occur (and be penalised) if the ball carrier accidentally collides with one of their own team's players while that player is attempting to retire behind the ball (or is otherwise in an offside position).

Onside
A player is onside whenever they are behind the relevant offside line for the particular phase of play. Players who are onside take an active part in playing the game.

Previously offside players may be "put onside" by the actions of other players (for example, in a kick ahead in open play, players in the kicker's team in front of the kick are offside but can be put onside by the kicker or any other team member who was onside at the time of the kick running up the pitch past them). So that players can be confident they are now onside and can take an active part in the game, the referee may shout "Onside" or "All Onside".

On the full
If the ball is kicked into touch without first bouncing inside the field of play it is termed as ball is kicked into touch on the full. The line-out is then taken from where the ball was kicked, except in situations where it was kicked from inside the 22.

Openside
The broad side of the pitch in relation to a scrum or a breakdown in play. The openside flanker is expected to cover the opposing team openside at scrum and breakdown. It is the opposite of blindside.

Overlap
Situation where there are more attacking players (typically backs) on one side of the field than there are defending players. An overlap can be used to manufacture a try by forcing the defenders into tackles and offloading to teammates until the defenders have run out.

== P ==
Pack
The pack is another name used for the forwards players, particularly when they are bound for a scrum.

Passing
A pass is to transfer a ball to a teammate by throwing it. Passes in rugby must not travel forwards. There are different varieties of pass, including the flat, direct spin pass; the short, close-quarters pop pass; and the floated pass - a long pass which an advancing player can run onto at pace.

Penalty
Penalties are awarded for serious infringements like dangerous play, offside and handling the ball on the ground in a ruck. Penalties are signalled by the referee with a straight arm raised in the air. Players can also receive red and yellow cards, as in association football.

The offending team must retire 10 metres (or to their goal line if closer) for both penalties and free kicks. A team can either kick for goal, tap and run the ball, take a scrum or kick directly into touch with the resulting line-out awarded to them.

Penalty kick
If a side commits a penalty infringement the opposition can take the option of a place kick at goal from where the infringement occurred (or, if the offence occurred when a player was in the process of kicking the ball, the non-offending team can opt to take the kick from where the ball landed which may be more advantageous). This is called a penalty kick. If successful, it is worth three points.

Penalty try
A penalty try awarded if the referee believes a team illegally prevented a try from probably being scored. As of 2018, penalty tries score an immediate seven points, with no conversion having to be taken. Generally a penalty try is awarded when the try-preventing offence cannot be easily attributed to a single individual, such as when a team repeatedly deliberately collapses a scrum near its own tryline. When the prevention of the try is due to an individual, a yellow card is a more common punishment.

Phase
A phase is the time a ball is in play between breakdowns. For example, first phase would be winning the ball at the lineout and passing to a centre who is tackled. Second phase would be winning the ball back from the ensuing breakdown and attacking again.

Pitch
The official name of a rugby playing field. Dimensions are 100 m long by 70 m wide.

Place kick
The place kick is a kicking style commonly used when kicking for goal. It typically involves placing the ball on the ground. To keep the ball in position, a mound of sand or plastic tee is sometimes used.

Pop pass
A very short pass.

Professional foul
A professional foul is a deliberate act of foul play, usually to prevent an opponent scoring. It is punishable by a yellow card.

Prop
They are the players wearing shirts number 1 and 3. The role of both the props is to support the hooker in the scrum and to provide support for the jumpers in the line-out. The props provide the main power in the push forward in the scrum. For this reason they need to be exceptionally big and strong.

== R ==
Red card
In international matches, red cards are shown by the referee to players who have been ordered off the pitch, which results in the player being removed from the game without being replaced. This usually occurs when a player is guilty of serious foul play, or violent conduct or for committing two offences resulting in cautions (yellow cards).

Red cards are also commonly used in non-international matches in precisely the same manner as in International matches but there is no regulation requiring their use. (i.e. in a domestic match, a referee may dismiss a player without actually displaying a red card.)

Red zone
This is a term most commonly used by coaches to describe the area of the pitch between the try line and around 22 metres out, in which it is most likely a try may be scored or conceded.

Restart
The kick taken from the centre line after the opposition have scored points.

Round the corner kicking
A style of place-kicking in which the kicker, instead of facing directly toward the goal-posts, approaches the ball from an angle and swings his kicking leg in an arc. It was first credited to Wilf Wooler in the 1930s.

Ruck
A ruck is formed when the ball is on the ground and two opposing players meet over the ball. The offside line becomes the last foot of the last player on each side of the ruck and players compete for the ball by attempting to drive one another from the area and to 'ruck' the ball backwards with their feet.

Rucks commonly form soon after tackles, but can form anywhere in the field of play where the ball is on the ground.

Handling the ball while it is in the vicinity of a ruck is a penalty offence. (Though modern practice allows a player on the ground to support the ball with their hands and for the player who is acting as scrum half to 'dig' for the ball once possession has been secured.)

If the ball remains contested and does not come out of a ruck after about five seconds, the referee will award a scrum to the team they consider to have been moving forward in the ruck.

== S ==
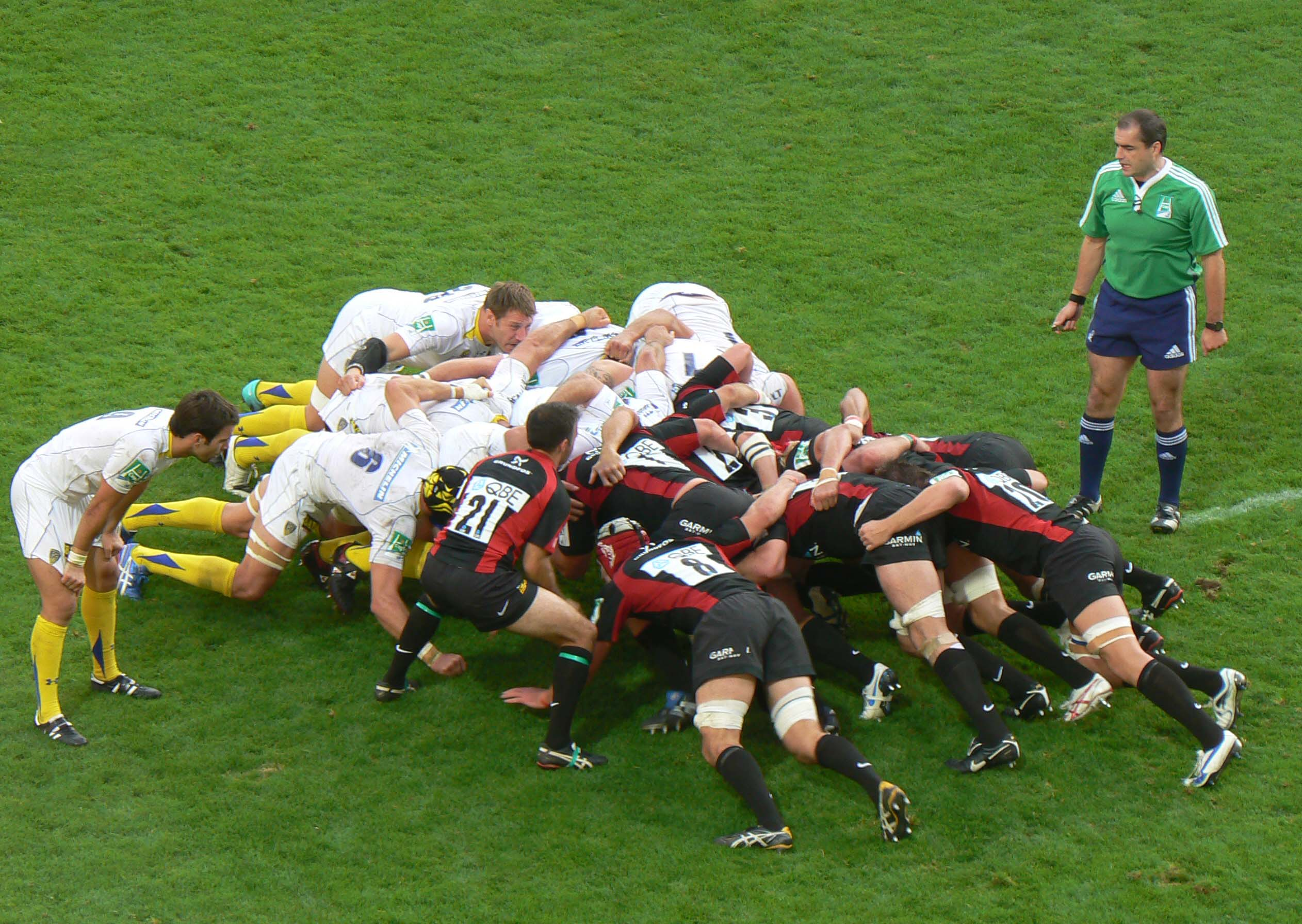
Scrum between ASM Clermont-Auvergne and Saracens.

Scrum
The eight forwards from each team bind together and push against each other. The scrum-half from the team that has been awarded possession feeds the ball into the centre of the scrum from the side most advantageous for his hooker (which is typically the side of loose head prop).

The ball must be fed straight down the middle of the tunnel and the hookers must not contest for the ball until it is put in. If they do, a free-kick is awarded for "foot up".

The scrum is taken again if the ball comes straight out of the tunnel or if it collapses. If the scrum wheels (rotates) due to pushing more than 90 degrees the scrum is reformed and awarded to the other side. Pulling in an attempt to unbalance the other side or to assist in rotating the scrum is a Penalty Offence.

Scrum half
Also known as a half-back (especially in New Zealand), they are the players traditionally wearing shirt number 9. Scrum halves form the all-important link between the forwards and the backs. They are relatively small but with a high degree of vision, the ability to react to situations very quickly, and good handling skills.

They are often the first tackler in defence and are behind every scrum, maul or ruck to get the ball out and maintain movement. They put the ball into the scrum and collect it afterwards. Scrum halves generally also act as "receiver" in the line-out to catch the ball knocked down by the forwards. (The receiver is a member of the line-out and so stands within 10 metres of it and may join the line once the ball is thrown.)

Selector
A person who is delegated with the task of choosing players for a team. Typically the term is used in the context of team selection for a national, county, state or provincial representative side, where the selector, or "selection panel", act under the authority of the relevant national or provincial administrative body.

Set piece
Collective term for the scrum, line-out and sometimes the restart.

Shoeing
At the breakdown a ruck commonly forms over the players involved in the tackle.

Where players who are on the ground on the opposition side of the ruck do not move away quickly enough, players on their feet may be tempted to "help" them move by pushing them away with their boots.

This potentially dangerous act is illegal and if done deliberately (or recklessly) may result in penalties and yellow or red cards.

Short arm penalty
See free kick

Sin bin
The notional area where a player must remain for a minimum of ten minutes after being shown a yellow card. In high level games, the sin bin is monitored by the fourth official.

Sipi Tau
Sipi Tau is a Tongan war dance performed by the Tonga national team before each of their international matches.

Siva Tau
Siva Tau is a Samoan war dance performed by the Samoa national team before each of their international matches.

Spear tackle
A spear tackle is a dangerous tackle in which a player is picked up by the tackler and turned so that they are upside down. The tackler then drops or drives the player into the ground often head, neck or shoulder first.

Spear tackles are particularly dangerous and have caused serious injury, including spinal damage, dislocations and broken bones in the shoulder or neck. On rare occasion, even death can occur.

Spear tackles are taken very seriously by the various Union disciplinary committees and can result in lengthy playing bans.

Stellenbosch Laws
The Stellenbosch Laws were a set of experimental laws of rugby union considered by World Rugby, then known as the International Rugby Board (IRB), from 2006 to 2008. The trials ended in late 2008, with the IRB choosing to adopt roughly half of the proposed changes.

== T ==
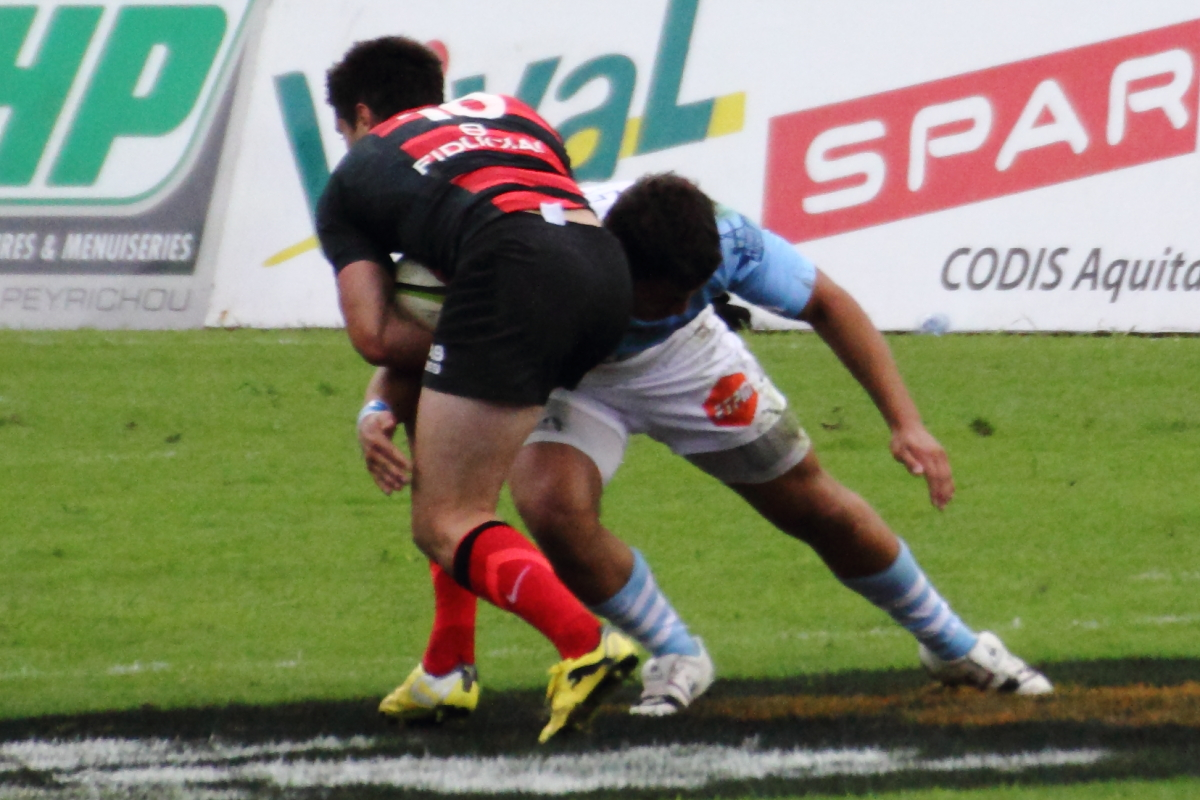
Tackle during a game between the Stade toulousain and Aviron Bayonnais.

Tackle
A tackle takes place when one or more opposition players [tackler(s)] grasp onto the ball carrier and succeed in bringing/pulling them to ground and holding them there.

Once briefly held, the tackler(s) must release the tackled player who must then themselves immediately release or attempt to pass the ball so that play can continue.

Tap kick
A tap kick is a type of kick used by players at penalties or free kicks to meet the regulation that requires the ball must be kicked a visible distance before a player may pass or run with it.

In a tap kick, the player momentarily releases the ball from their hands and taps it with their foot or lower leg and then quickly catches it again. The player will then generally try to run forward with the ball.

Tap-tackle
Despite its name, a tap tackle is a not actually a tackle as the ball carrier is brought to ground by a form of trip, is not actually held on the ground and may attempt to get up and continue to run. A tap tackle is used when a defending player is unable to get close enough to the ball carrier but is able to dive at the other player's feet and, with outstretched arm, deliver a tap or hook to the player's foot (or feet) causing the player to stumble. At speed, this will often be sufficient to bring the ball-carrier down, allowing a teammate of the tackling player to retrieve the ball or provide sufficient delay for the defending team to organise a defence.

Ten Metre Law
The Ten Metre Law is a form of offside which is designed to prevent injury to a defending player who attempts to catch a ball that has been kicked ahead by the attacking side.

In the normal Law of Offside in open play, it is possible for an offside player to be put onside by actions of the opposing team. This ability to be put onside by a member of the opposing team does not apply if the offside player was within 10 metres along the field of a defending player waiting to catch the ball and the offside player remains offside until either he/she retreats onside or is put onside by a member of their own team.

Test match
International rugby union matches with full (Test) status are called Test matches.

Tight Head
The tight head prop is the player who takes the right-hand position on the front row of the scrum. A tight head prop traditionally wears the number 3 shirt. They are named the tight head since in the scrum they will have an opposition player bind to both their left- and right-hand sides, meaning their head is unexposed to the side of the scrum, as opposed to the loose head, whose left-hand side is exposed.

TMO
Television match official (TMO), commonly called the video referee.

Touch
Touch is the area outside and including the two touch-lines which define the sides of the playing area. As the touch-lines are not part of the playing area they are part of touch. The ball, and players carrying the ball, are not considered to be in touch until they touch the floor.

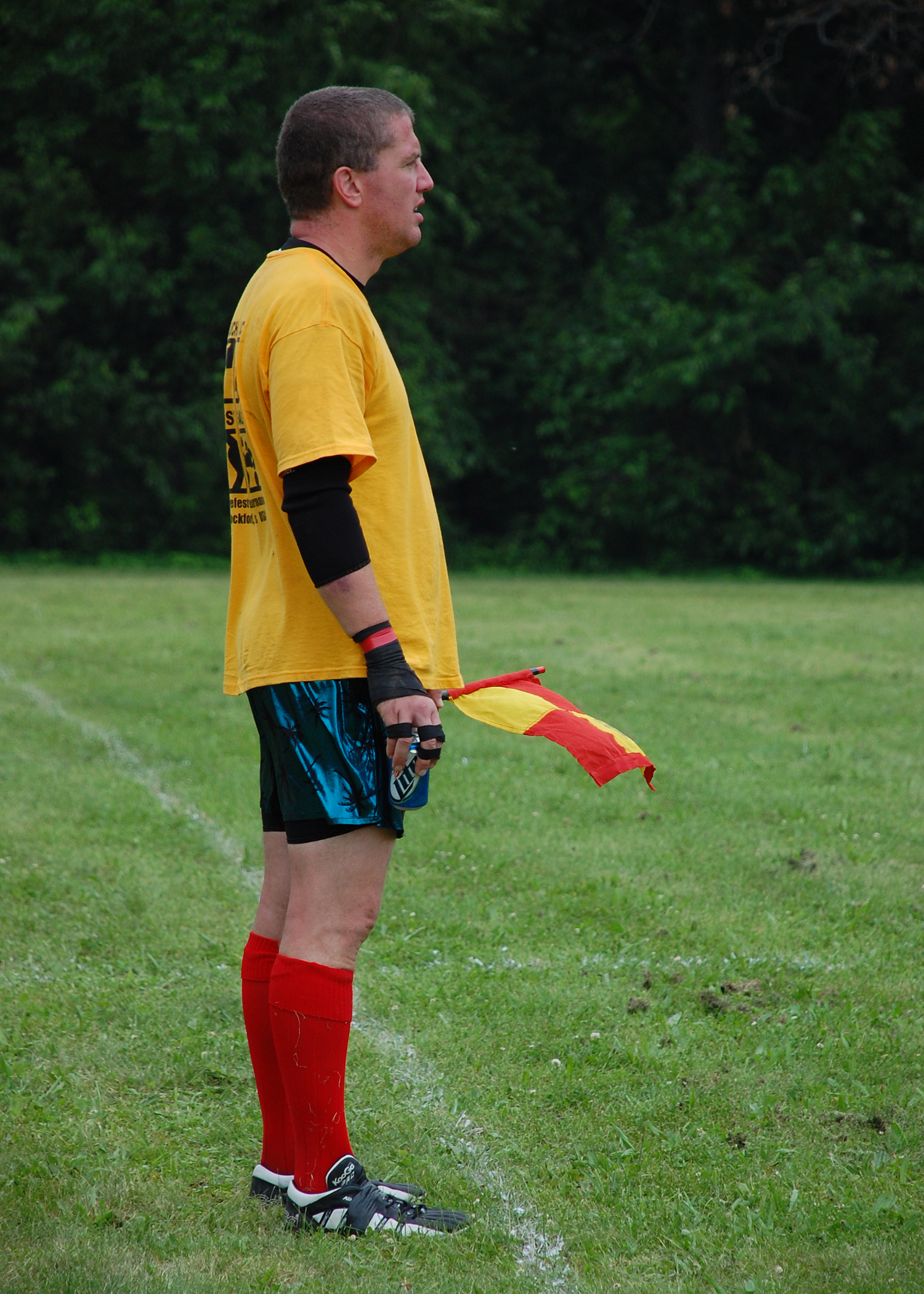
Touch judge.

Touch judge
The touch judge is an official who monitors the touch-line and raises a flag if the ball (or player carrying it) goes into touch. Touch judges also stand behind the posts to confirm that a goal has been scored following a penalty kick or conversion of a try.

Truck and trailer
A colloquial term for an accidental obstruction. "Truck and trailer" occurs when a player carrying the ball leaves a maul, along with one or more of his teammates. Once the ball carrier leaves the maul, the maul is over, and if the ball carrier's teammates are in front of the ball carrier and prevent defending players from making a tackle, the defending team will be awarded a scrum. If the incident of truck and trailer is judged to be deliberate or the latest in a series of similar infringements, a penalty may be awarded instead.

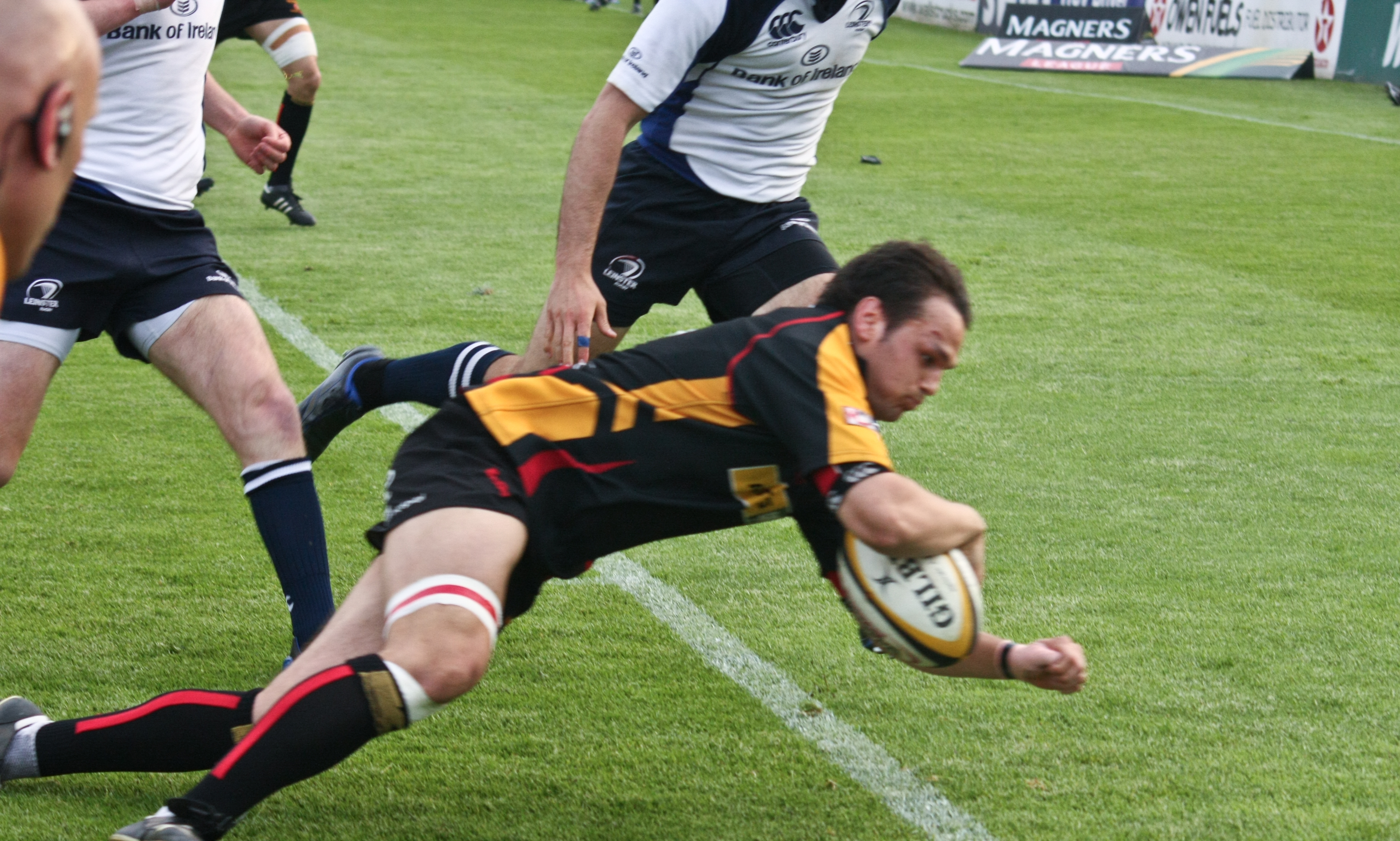
Try during a game between Newport Gwent Dragons and Leinster in the Magners League

Try
This is the primary method of scoring. A try is worth five points. It is scored when a player places the ball on the ground with downward pressure in the in-goal area between (and including) the goal-line and up to but not including dead ball line of the opposition's half. (As the goal posts and post protectors are also part of the goal-line, touching the ball down against the base of these is also a try.)

There is no such thing as an "own try". If you touch the ball down in your own in-goal area, it results in a goal-line dropout or a five-metre scrum.

Tunnel
When a scrum is formed, the gap between the legs of the three players from each team who form the 'front row' is called the 'tunnel'.

Turnover
When a team concedes possession of the ball, particularly at the breakdown, they are said to have turned the ball over to the other team. This can happen due to defending players stealing the ball from an isolated attacker, counter rucking, a knock on, an intercepted pass or the ball not emerging from a maul (wherein the referee awards the scrum feed to the opposing team).

Twenty two metre drop-out
A drop kick is taken from behind the 22m line if a team touches down in its own in-goal area but did not carry the ball over the try line, or if the ball is kicked over the dead ball line from any other play other than the kick-off.

The ball only needs to cross the line, but if it goes directly into touch a scrum is awarded to the receiving team at the centre-point of the 22m line.

== U ==
Uncontested scrum
Scrum in which, due to absence of key specialist forwards through injuries or yellow cards, the safety of the scrum cannot be guaranteed. In an uncontested scrum, the players form a scrum but the two teams do not push against each other or compete for possession.

Up and under
An up and under, or a Garryowen kick, is a high, short punt onto or behind the defending team.

Use it or lose it
If a maul stops moving forward the referee will often shout "use it or lose it" to the team in possession of the ball. This means they must pass the ball within a five-second time period. If they do not, the referee will call a scrum and the team not in possession at the beginning of the maul will be given the feed.

== V ==
Video referee
Also called TMO (Television Match Official). This is the official who monitors the match in television recorded matches. They are the person who could be called upon by the referee if they are unaware of the outcome of a rugby situation. A good example is a try that is obscured from view i.e. under numerous players.

== W ==
Wheeling
A scrum that has rotated through 90 degrees or more is said to have "wheeled". The referee will order the scrum to be reset, with the ball being turned over if the attacking team is deemed to have been deliberately or repeatedly wheeling the scrum.

World Cup Joker
A player signed by a professional club, usually on a short term deal, as a replacement during a Rugby World Cup. The term is most commonly associated with France's top league. Examples that took place during the 2023 Rugby World Cup include Alun Wyn Jones for Toulon or Logovi'i Mulipola for Montpellier.

Wing
The players wearing shirts numbers 11 and 14 are the left and right wingers. Wingers must be fast runners and agile in order to evade tackles and have excellent ball-handling skills in order to pass and receive the ball at pace.

== Y ==
Yellow Card
In International matches, a yellow card is shown to a player who has been cautioned to indicate "temporary suspension" for repeated or deliberate infringements of the rules. The offending player is sent to the “sin bin” for at least 10 minutes while his team must play a man short. A player who is temporarily suspended cannot return to the pitch until the first break in play after their 10-minute suspension is completed.

In domestic matches, yellow cards are commonly used in exactly the same manner as in International matches but this is not required by regulation so a referee may order the temporary suspension of a player without showing a yellow card.
