= Contact sport =

Sport involving physical contact between players or their environment

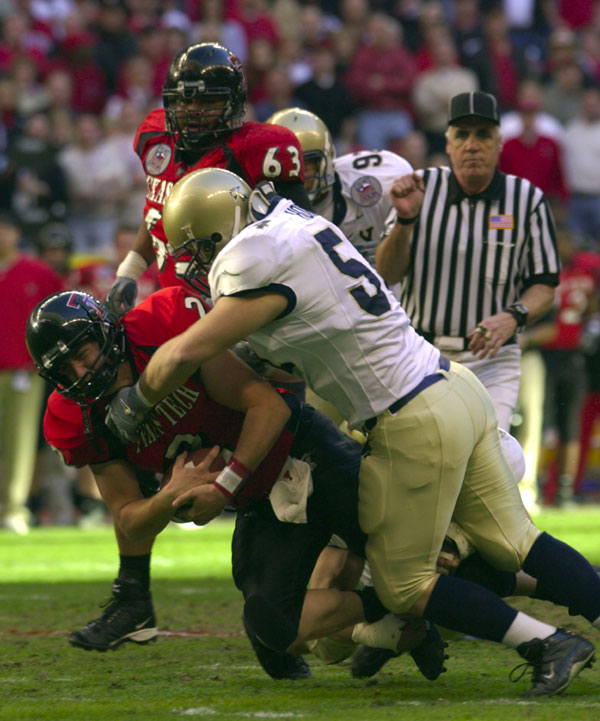
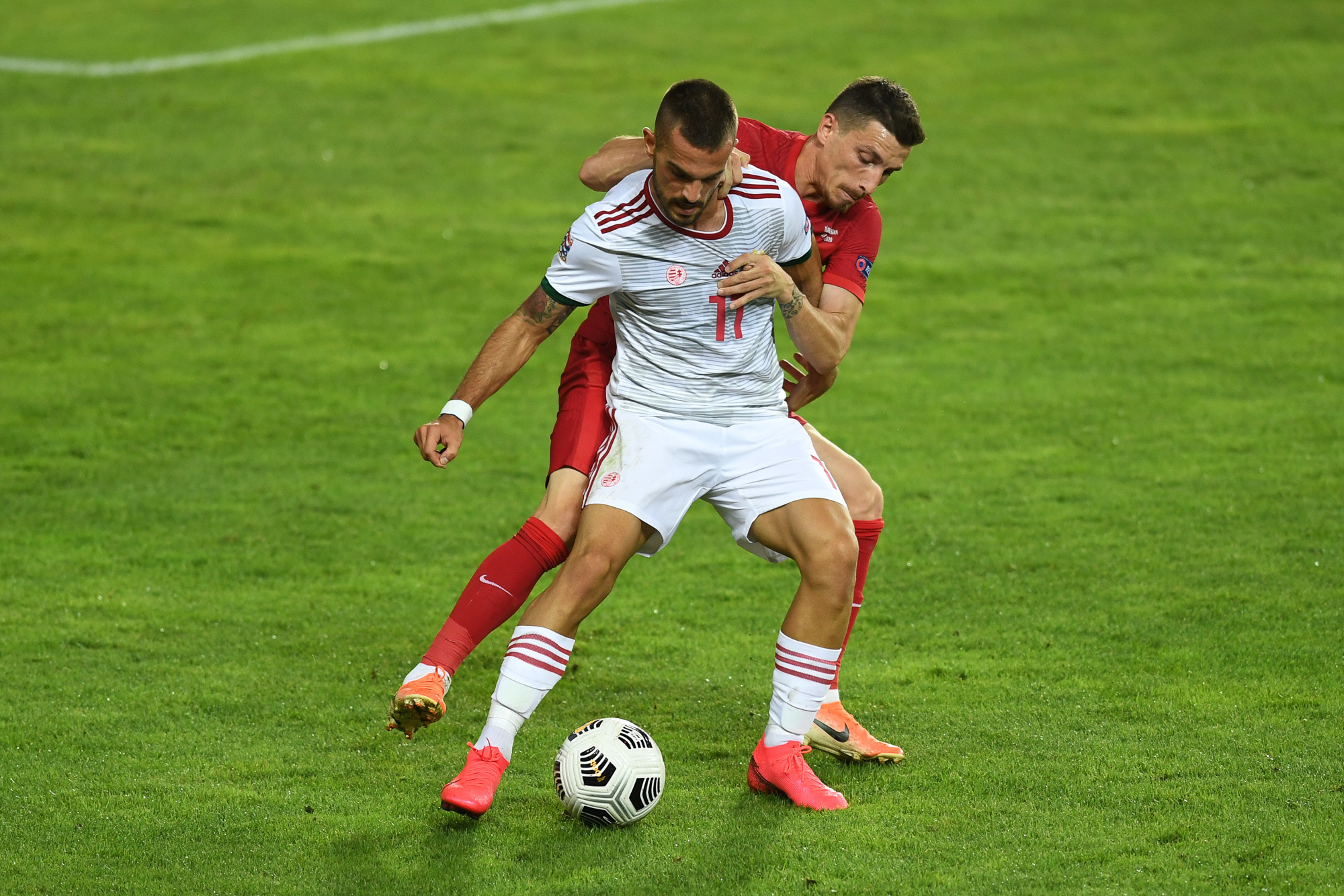
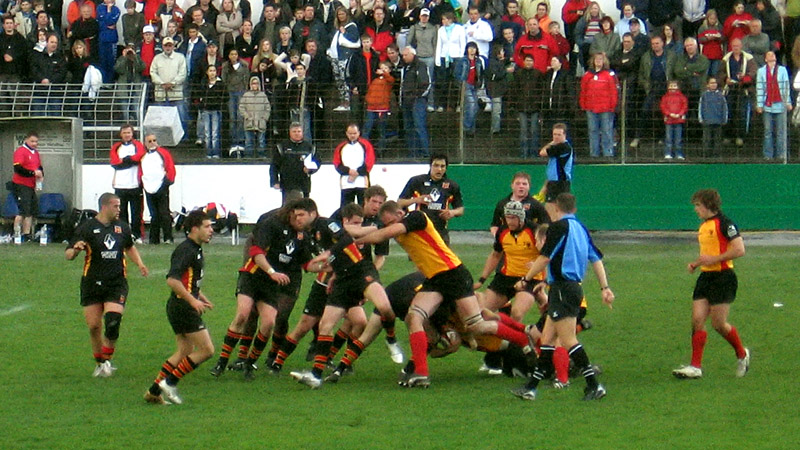
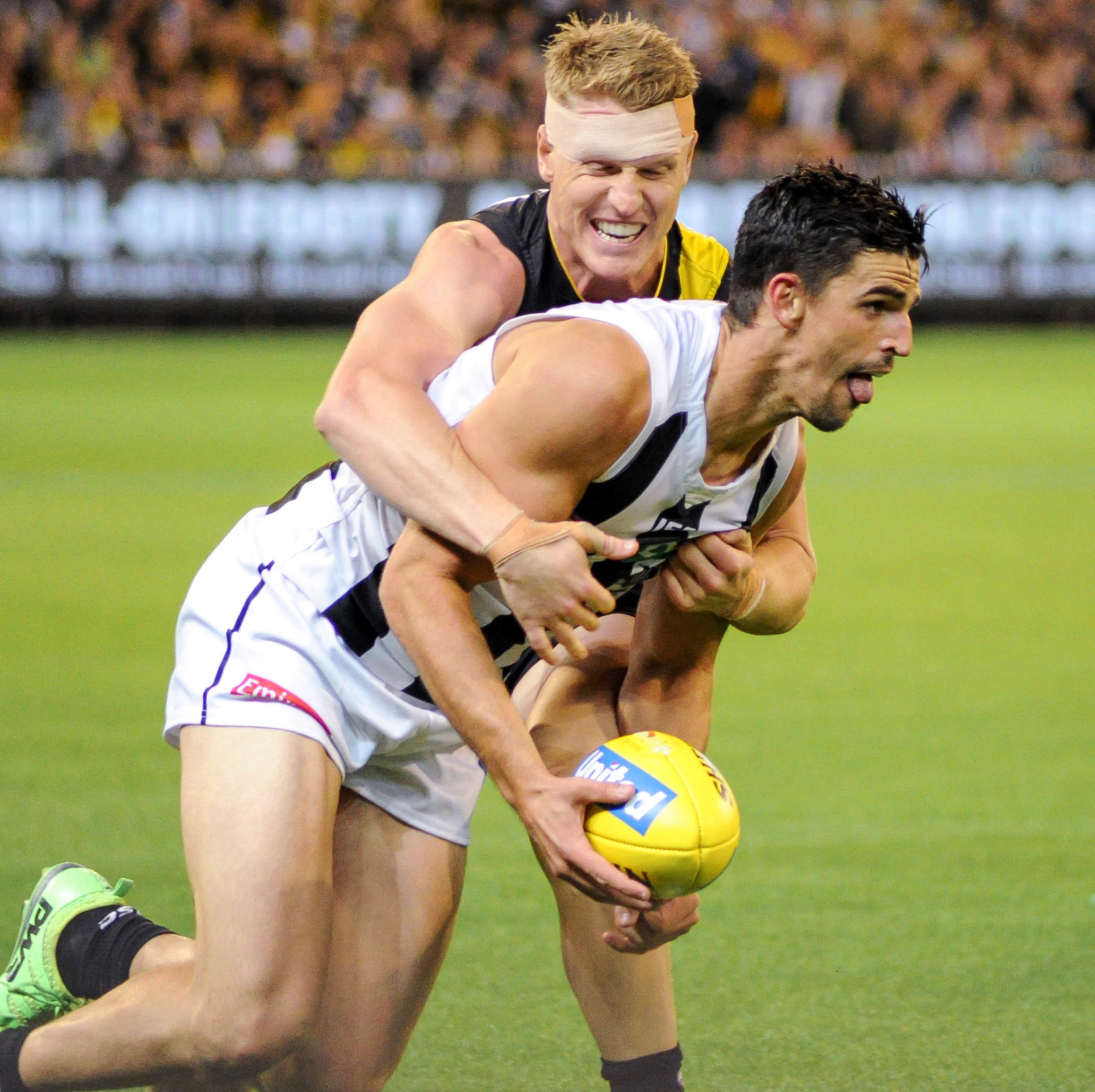
Various major contact sports.
Clockwise:
Rugby union
American football
Association football (soccer)
Australian rules football

A contact sport is any sport where physical contact between competitors, or their environment, is an integral part of the game. Examples include gridiron football, rugby football, martial arts, and acrobatic sports. Contact may come about as the result of intentional or incidental actions by the players in the course of play. This is in contrast to non-contact sports where players often have no opportunity to make contact with each other and the laws of the game may expressly forbid contact. In contact sports some forms of contact are encouraged as a critical aspect of the game such as tackling, while others are incidental such as when shielding the ball or contesting an aerial challenge. As the types of contact between players is not equal between all sports they define the types of contact that is deemed acceptable and fall within the laws of the game, while outlawing other types of physical contact that might be considered expressly dangerous or risky such as a high tackle or spear tackle, or against the spirit of the game such as striking below the belt or other unsportsmanlike conduct. Where there is a limit as to how much contact is acceptable most sports have a mechanism to call a foul by the referee, umpire or similar official when an offence is deemed to have occurred.

Contact sports are categorised by the American Academy of Pediatrics (AAP) into three main categories: contact, limited-contact and noncontact. In attempting to define relative risk for competitors in sports the AAP have further defined contact sports as containing some element of intentional collision between players. They define such collision sports as being where: "athletes purposely hit or collide with each other or with inanimate objects (including the ground) with great force", while in limited-contact sports such impacts are often "infrequent and inadvertent". While contact sports are considered the most high risk for injury, in some sports being a major feature (such as boxing or other martial arts), limited-contact and non-contact sports are not without risk as injury or contact may come about as a result of a fall or collision with the playing area, or a piece of sporting equipment, such as being struck by a hockey stick or football or even a piece of protective wear worn by a teammate or opposition player.

Some definitions of contact sports, particularly martial arts, have the concept of full contact, semi-contact and non-contact (or other definitions) for both training and competitive sparring. Some categories of contact may or may not be combined with other methods of scoring, but full contact is generally considered to include the potential for victory by knockout or submission depending on the form of combat. An example of this is full contact karate and taekwondo where competitors are allowed to attempt to knock out an opponent through strikes to the head or otherwise bringing the opponent to the floor. Full contact rules differentiate from other forms of the same sports that may otherwise restrict blows to the head and the use of elbows or knees. Such full contact sports may be defined as combat sports and require a of change equipment, alter or omit rules, and are generally differentiated from contact sports by their explicit intent of defeating an opponent in physical combat.

Some contact sports have limited-contact or non-contact variations (such as flag football for American football) which attempt to replace tackling and other forms of contact with alternative methods of interacting with an opponent, such as removing a flag from a belt worn by the opponent or outlawing specific actions entirely such as in walking football.

== Nomenclature ==
Current medical terminology in the United States uses the term contact sport and collision sport to refer to sports like rugby, American football, professional wrestling, ice hockey, lacrosse and roller derby. The term limited-contact sport is used to refer to sports such as soccer, baseball and handball, and the term noncontact sport to sports like badminton, running and swimming.

The American Academy of Pediatrics policy statement was revised in 2008 to include the following definition:

In collision sports (e.g. boxing, ice hockey, American football, lacrosse, and rodeo), athletes purposely hit or collide with each other or with inanimate objects (including the ground) with great force. In contact sports (e.g. basketball), athletes routinely make contact with each other or with inanimate objects but usually with less force than in collision sports. In limited-contact sports (e.g. softball and squash), contact with other athletes or with inanimate objects is infrequent or inadvertent.

== Grades ==
=== Full-contact martial arts ===
A full contact sport is primarily any combat sport that allows the competitor to attempt to knock-out or otherwise defeat their opponent by physically incapacitating them. Examples of this would include most professional martial arts such as mixed martial arts, boxing and some forms of karate and taekwondo. Defeating an opponent generally takes place using in isolation or combination actions such as striking and grappling depending on the rules of the sport.

Full-contact martial arts include:

- Boxing
- Brazilian jiu-jitsu
- Judo
- Various forms of Full contact karate
- Kickboxing
- Lethwei
- Mixed martial arts
- Muay Thai
- Pradal serey
- Sambo
- Sanda
- Savate
- Sumo
- Taekkyon
- Some forms of Taekwondo
- Vovinam
- Wrestling
- Armored combat (sport)

=== Semi-contact martial arts ===
A semi-contact sport is typically a combat sport involving striking and containing physical contact between the combatants simulating full-power techniques. The techniques are restricted to limited power and rendering the opponent unconscious is forbidden. Some semi-contact sports use a point system to determine the winner and use extensive protective gear to protect the athletes from injury. Examples of semi-contact sports include karate, kalaripayattu, Kenpo, various Korean martial arts that incorporate contact rules sparring, kendo, some types of historical European martial arts, fencing and taekwondo.

=== Contact sports ===
As defined by the AAP and also considered collision sports. The AAP notes Martial arts can be subclassified as judo, jujitsu, karate, kung fu, and tae kwon do; some forms are contact sports and others are limited-contact sports.

- American football
- Association football
- Australian football
- Boxing
- Camogie
- Canadian football
- Cheerleading
- Diving
- Extreme sports
- Field hockey
- Gymnastics
- Ice hockey
- Hurling
- Lacrosse
- Martial arts
- Rodeo
- Rugby league
- Rugby union
- Skiing, downhill
- Ski jumping
- Snowboarding
- Team handball
- Water polo
- Wrestling

=== Limited-contact sports ===
As defined by the AAP. The AAP notes Martial arts can be subclassified as judo, jujitsu, karate, kung fu, and tae kwon do; some forms are contact sports and others are limited-contact sports.

- Adventure racing
- Baseball
- Basketball
- Bicycling
- Cross-country skiing
- Fencing
- Field events
- Floor hockey
- Football, flag or touch
- Futsal
- Gaelic football
- Gaelic handball
- Handball
- High jump
- Horseback riding
- Ice skating
- Inline skating
- Martial arts
- Pole vault
- Racquetball
- Roller skating
- Skateboarding
- Skiing
- Softball
- Squash
- Surfing or windsurfing
- Volleyball
- Water skiing
- Weightlifting
- Whitewater canoeing or whitewater kayaking

Tag, while rarely an organized sport, could also be considered a semi-contact sport.

=== Non-contact sports ===
As defined by the AAP.

- Badminton
- Bodybuilding
- Bowling
- Canoeing or kayaking (flatwater)
- Cricket
- Curling
- Dance
- Discus
- Field events
- Golf
- Javelin
- Netball
- Orienteering
- Power lifting
- Race walking
- Riflery
- Rope jumping
- Rowing
- Running
- Sailing
- Scuba diving
- Shot-put
- Swimming
- Table tennis
- Tennis
- Track
- Ultimate frisbee

== Sports injury and prevention ==
=== Equipment ===
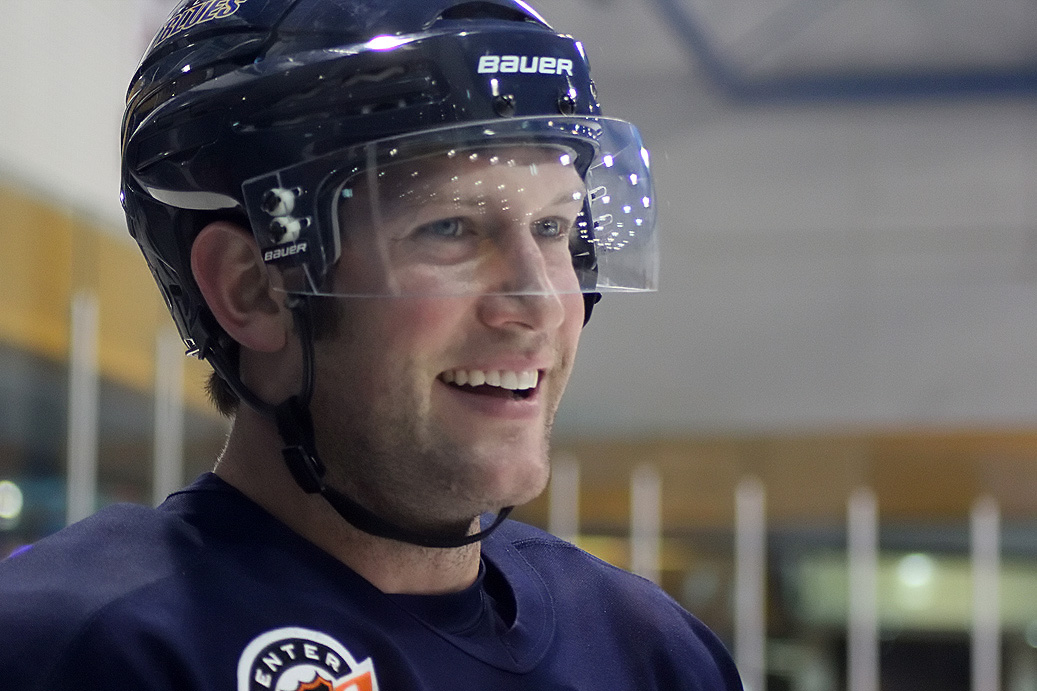
St. Louis Blues player David Backes with ice hockey helmet.

As a result of the risk of injury, some sports require the use of protective equipment, for example American football protective equipment or the gloves and helmets needed for underwater hockey. Some sports are also played on soft ground and have padding on physical obstacles, such as goal posts.

Most contact sports require any male players to wear a protective cup to protect their genitalia.

There has been an increasing medical, academic, and media focus on sports involving rapid contact in the late 20th to early 21st century and their relationship with sports injuries. Several sports' governing bodies began changing their rules in order to decrease the incidence of serious injuries and avoid lawsuits. In some countries, new laws have been passed, particularly in regard to concussions.

To reduce concussions in American football, the National Football League implemented the use of Guardian Caps. Guardian Caps are soft-shelled helmets that have a soft material covering the outside of the helmet that absorb the initial intensity of the impact. These caps are worn in practice and in games by different football levels, ranging from youth athletes to those in the National Football League. According to the NFL, because of the Guardian Cap NXT, concussions have decreased by 52%.

=== Concussion protocols ===
At the professional level, America's professional football league, the National Football League, implemented The Concussion Protocol in 2011, banning concussed players from re-entering the same game in which they were injured in order to reduce the risk of further injury and damage.

In Canada in 2018, Rowan's Law was passed after the death of a young Canadian female athlete. Rowan Stringer died in 2013 of second-impact syndrome, "...the result of suffering multiple concussions playing rugby three times in six days."

Doctors and sports physical therapists can use ImPACT tests to test athletes post-concussion, and help them with a speedy recovery. This is conducted through cognitive tests, verbal and visual memory activities, and reaction time. These tests are done to make sure that the athletes are cleared to play, and won't be at risk for another concussion.

=== Long-term Effects ===
There are two main long term effects caused by ongoing concussions in contact sports, CTE (Chronic Traumatic Encephalopathy) and PCS (Post-Concussion Syndrome). Studies on retired and deceased former players have found signs of increased rates of CTE, dementia, and other, often incurable, neurological diseases.

Symptoms of long term effects include increased irritability, anxiety, processing speed, and difficulties with memory.

== See also ==
- Blood sport
- Fouls and misconduct
- Laws of the Game (disambiguation)
- Sportsmanship

== Bibliography ==
- Moenig, Udo (2015). From a Martial Art to a Martial Sport. Taylor & Francis. ISBN 9781317557333.
