= Ma'a Nonu =

New Zealand rugby union player

Ma'a Nonu MNZM
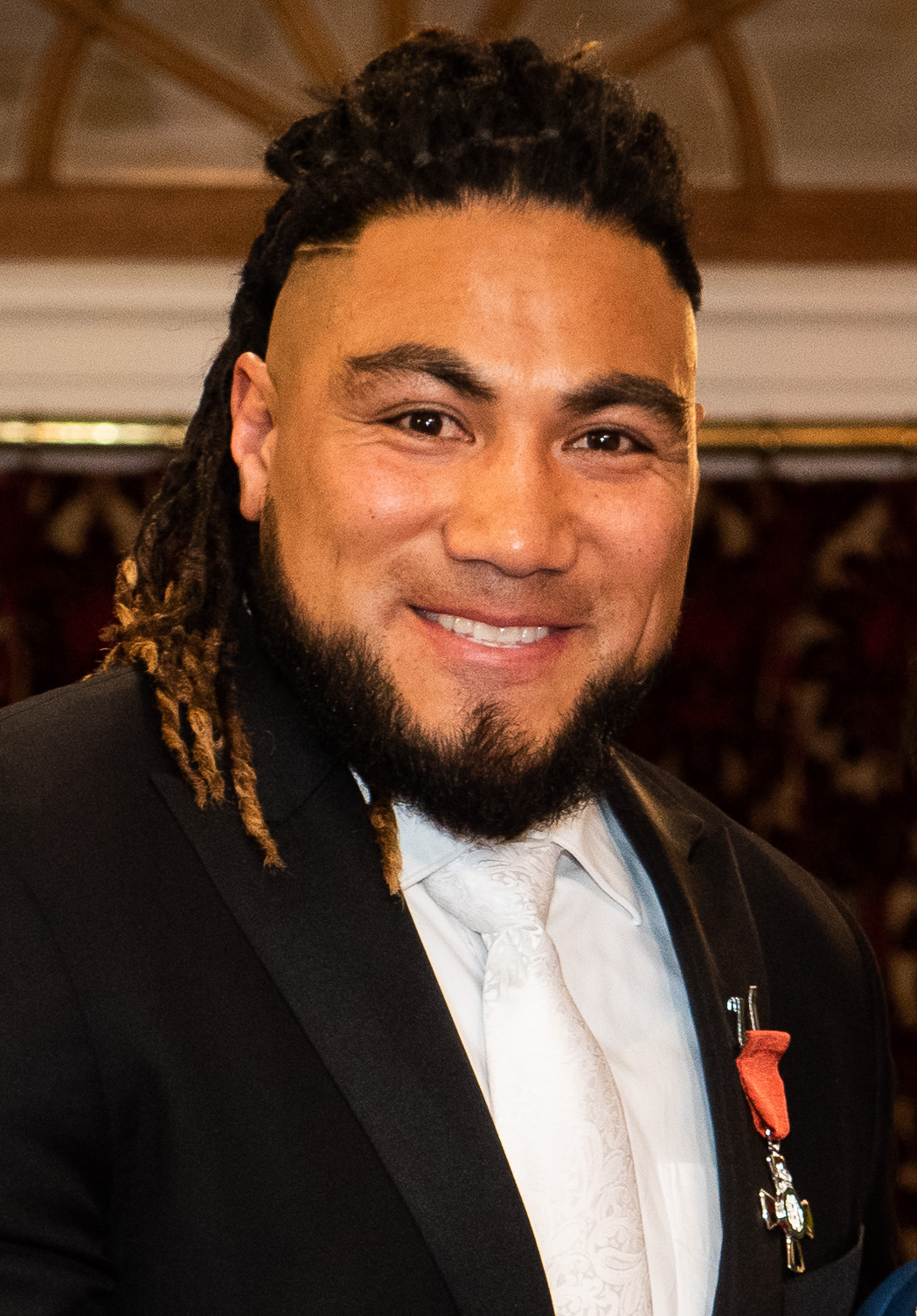
- Nonu in 2019
- Born: Ma'a Allan Nonu; 21 May 1982 (age 44) Wellington, New Zealand
- Height: 182 cm (6 ft 0 in)
- Weight: 108 kg (238 lb; 17 st 0 lb)
- School: Rongotai College
- Notable relative: Jack Afamasaga (cousin)

Rugby union career
- Position(s): Centre, Wing
- Current team: Sharks
Senior career
Years	Team	Apps	(Points)
2002–2010	Wellington	61	(140)
2003–2011, 2015	Hurricanes	126	(240)
2011–2012	Black Rams Tokyo	12	(30)
2012, 2014, 2019	Blues	39	(35)
2013	Highlanders	9	(5)
2015–2021, 2025–2026	Toulon	108	(90)
2020–2024	San Diego Legion	44	(43)
2021	East Coast	4	(0)
2026	Sharks	1	(0)
- Correct as of 12 August 2026
International career
Years	Team	Apps	(Points)
2003–2015	New Zealand	103	(155)
2007	Junior All Blacks	2	(10)
2007–2010	Barbarian F.C.	2	(0)
- Correct as of 12 August 2026
National sevens team
Years	Team		Comps
2002–2004	New Zealand		2
- Correct as of 12 August 2026

Ma'a Allan Nonu MNZM (/ˈmɑːʔɑː ˈnɒnuː/; born 21 May 1982) is a professional rugby union player from New Zealand who currently plays for the Sharks in the United Rugby Championship. He plays as an inside centre, but can also cover outside centre and wing.

He was a key member of the All Blacks' 2011 and 2015 Rugby World Cup winning teams, becoming one of only 44 players who have won the Rugby World Cup on multiple occasions.

He is regarded as one of the greatest centres to ever play the game of rugby union.

He currently holds the record for both the oldest appearance maker and try scorer in Top 14 history.

== Career ==
=== Early career ===
Nonu attended Strathmore Park Primary School in Wellington, then attended Rongotai College in Wellington. At club level, he represented Oriental Rongotai in the Wellington competition. He played for the Wellington Secondary Schools team in 1999–2000, and the Wellington Under 19s team in 2001. He also played rugby league as a youngster.

=== Professional career and the All Blacks ===
He made his provincial debut for Wellington in the 2002 NPC and debuted for the Hurricanes in the 2003 Super 12. He played for the New Zealand Sevens in 2004. On the back of some outstanding Super 12 form, Nonu made his Test debut for the All Blacks on 14 June 2003, starting at centre in a 15-13 loss to England.

Nonu missed selection for the 2003 Tri Nations, with the selectors preferring Umaga, Aaron Mauger and Daniel Carter in the midfield. He was selected for the All Blacks' 2003 World Cup squad and played in pool matches against Canada, Italy and Tonga. He scored his first Test try against Canada and was generally impressive on attack and easily breaking the line and his big stature was intimidating to the opposition. However, question marks over his defensive game and inexperience meant he was not selected for the knockout stage of the tournament despite an injury to Umaga.

Nonu missed selection for the Tri Nations in 2004 after a form slump in the Super 12. He forced his way back into contention playing for Wellington in the 2004 NPC, and played as a substitute in all four matches on the All Blacks' undefeated end of year tour to Europe.

Nonu played on the wing for much of the 2005 Super 12, with Conrad Smith preferred as Umaga's midfield partner. Standout performances included a hat trick against 2004 Super 12 champions the Brumbies. Nonu played at second five-eighth for the Possibles in the 2005 All Blacks trial, scoring two tries and setting up two more to inspire the Possibles to an upset win over the Probables. He played in the second Test against the 2005 British & Irish Lions as a substitute, replacing Sitiveni Sivivatu on the wing. He again missed selection for the 2005 Tri Nations.

Wellington Lions captain Umaga was rested during the 2005 NPC, and in his absence Nonu was promoted to the captaincy of the team. During the NPC, he established himself as one of New Zealand's most dangerous midfield runners. He was selected for the 2005 All Blacks Grand Slam tour, playing Tests as a substitute against Wales and Scotland, and earning his third Test start against Ireland. He was cited for an alleged spear tackle against Brian O'Driscoll during the Test against The British and Irish Lions, but was later cleared of the charge.

In 2006 Nonu was ruled out of the Tri Nations squad due to injury, Mils Muliaina being chosen to take his place. He damaged the base of his left thumb playing club rugby in Wellington, which required him to have surgery. He was, however, included in the end of year tour with the All Blacks.

Due to his absence from the All Blacks Tri Nations squad, Nonu was able to play every game with the Wellington Lions in the Air New Zealand Cup, which greatly helped them. Nonu missed out on selection for the 2007 Rugby World Cup, with the selectors preferring Aaron Mauger, Luke McAlister, Conrad Smith and Isaia Toeava in the centres.

The game against Argentina on 28 September 2013 marked a record fiftieth international game in combination with Conrad Smith.

=== Rugby league ===
In December 2006, Nonu expressed a desire to switch codes to rugby league and play in the National Rugby League (NRL) after the 2007 Rugby World Cup. A move overseas was seen as more likely as he was not named in Graham Henry's 2007 squad but was instead dropped to the Junior All Blacks.

In 2008, Nonu returned to the All Blacks, starting in the majority of tests throughout the year, and regarded to be the All Blacks first choice inside centre.

=== 2011 Tri-Nations and Rugby World Cup ===
Nonu played his first international of 2011 in a friendly against Fiji.

He played in New Zealand's first Tri-Nations game against South Africa. The All Blacks ended up winning 40-7. He then went on to play New Zealand's next game in the Tri-Nations against Australia where he scored the opening try. He played the final game of the tournament against Australia and scored his 21st international try.

Nonu was selected for the All Blacks 2011 Rugby World Cup. He scored the final try in the All Blacks' opening match against Tonga. On 23 October 2011, he played in the final against France, which the All Blacks won by 8-7 to become world champions.

=== Ricoh Black Rams ===
Following the 2011 Rugby World Cup, Nonu joined the Black Rams Tokyo, in Japan, on a short-term 'sabbatical'. In 12 games for the Rams, he scored six tries and received one yellow card.

=== Blues ===
On 1 July 2011, Nonu announced he had signed a two year contract with the Blues. This was after the Hurricanes announced he would not be resigned following the 2011 Super Rugby season.

Nonu made his debut for the Blues in round three of the 2012 Super Rugby season. 2012 was a below average season for Nonu in terms of form and his struggle to return to the number 12 jersey for the All Blacks. Nonu's performances following his return from his Black Rams sabbatical were met with poor response and led to his exclusion from the match day 22 for the Ireland test series. Nonu's place was filled by Sonny Bill Williams, whose form and consistency kept Nonu out of the 12 jersey until Week 3 of the 2012 Rugby Championship. Due to injury to former Hurricanes teammate Conrad Smith, Nonu returned to the All Blacks starting lineup in the first week of the inaugural Rugby Championship at 13, centre, with Sonny Bill at 12, forming what was considered the most 'destructive' centre pairing in rugby at the time.

Nonu returned to the All Blacks number 12 jersey. Following Williams' departure to Japan and then the NRL, Nonu played all but one of the remaining tests at second five-eighth, except against Scotland where he came off the bench.

=== Super Rugby movements ===
After one season in Auckland, Nonu moved to Dunedin, signing a one year deal with the Highlanders for the 2013 Super Rugby season.

After struggling to find a Super Rugby team for 2014, (where all 5 New Zealand franchises initially stated they weren't interested in signing him), Nonu eventually turned down a lucrative offer to play for French Top 14 side Clermont, to return to the Blues for another season. In doing so, he made himself available to continue playing for the All Blacks throughout 2014 and ultimately gain selection for the Rugby World Cup the following year in England.

Nonu returned to the Hurricanes for the 2015 Super Rugby season, the team he left in 2011. It was speculated that the departure of former Hurricanes coach Mark Hammett to the Cardiff Blues paved the way for his return.

=== Toulon ===
On 20 December 2014, it was announced Nonu would be joining Top 14 side Toulon after the 2015 Rugby World Cup on a two year deal.

=== 2015 World Cup ===
Nonu was selected as the starting inside centre for the 2015 Rugby World Cup, he played in nearly every pool game. Nonu played every knockout match and scored a 50m solo try to help the All Blacks beat Australia 34-17 in the final.

In the 2016 New Year Honours, Nonu was appointed a Member of the New Zealand Order of Merit for services to rugby.

=== Second Blues return ===
Nonu signed with the Blues for the 2019 Super Rugby season.

=== San Diego Legion ===
Major League Rugby announced in October 2019 that Nonu would play for the San Diego Legion in the 2020 season. Nonu was named captain of the San Diego Legion for the 2022 season.

He played his last game for the club in July 2024 during the conference league semi-final, a loss to Seattle Seawolves.

=== Return to Toulon ===
Although having never officially retired, Nonu was thought to have played his last professional game the previous season. However, in February 2025, at the age of 42, he re-signed with his former club Toulon in the Top14 as an injury replacement until the end of the season. In March 2025, he replaced Gabin Villière off the bench during a league fixture against Castres. Despite losing the game 28–26 he overtook the previous record holder, Karena Wihongi for the oldest player ever to play in the Top14.

In July 2025, he signed on a permanent one year deal ahead of the 2025–26 season. In October 2025, he became the oldest try scorer in Top14 history at 43 years old during a 33–17 victory over Pau. Later that month, he extended this record with another try in a 45–21 victory against Racing 92. This game also marked his 100th appearance for the club across his two stints.

=== Sharks ===
In August 2026, Nonu signed for Sharks, initially to help develop the club's youth players, before he was drafted into the playing squad amid an injury crisis. He made his debut for the Sharks against the touring All Blacks team, coming on as a 61st minute replacement for Murray Koster. Prior to the start of the match, Nonu performed a solo rendition of the All Blacks' alternate haka Kapa o Pango in response to their performance of the Ka Mate haka.

== Playing style ==
Nonu is well known for his explosiveness and powerful attacking runs and regularly breaks the defensive line at will. 2011 World Cup winning All Blacks coach Graham Henry has described him as "probably the best linebreaker in this game in this country."

Nonu has been noted to possess a similar attacking skillset to former All Black centre Tana Umaga. Like Umaga, he is an exceptional crash ball runner who excels at breaking the line and creating space for outside backs. In 2005, Henry described Nonu as "young Tana," underlining the impression that he was being talked up as a potential successor to Umaga. This comparison has been confirmed in recent times by Wayne Smith.

== Personal life ==
Nonu became a vegetarian while playing in France for Toulon, citing his son Michael as his motivation: "Michael, my second one, he's seven years old. When he was growing up, I was trying to feed him meat – chicken – and he never liked it. I thought 'let's try something new'. I said 'I'm not going to eat meat because I feel sorry for him enough, he'll (feel) stink. If we're going out and I'm ordering a T-bone steak and he's eating his carrots and cucumber … so I said look for the love of my son I won't eat meat because I'll try to be the same as him".

According to Nonu, part of the reason why he had remained in good condition and fitness despite his advancing years was because he was very careful about what he ate, crediting his new diet with his resurgence playing Super Rugby for the Blues at 37 years old. "It's helped me physically and I enjoy it, you know."

== Honours ==
- New Zealand:
  - Member of the New Zealand Order of Merit (MNZM) (2019)
