= List of sports idioms =

The following is a list of phrases from sports that have become idioms (slang or otherwise) in English. They have evolved usages and meanings independent of sports and are often used by those with little knowledge of these games.

The sport from which each phrase originates has been included immediately after the phrase. In some cases, the specific sport may not be known; these entries may be followed by the generic term sports, or a slightly more specific term, such as team sports (referring to such games as baseball, football, hockey, etc.), ball sports (baseball, tennis, volleyball, etc.), etc.

This list does not include idioms derived exclusively from baseball. The body of idioms derived from that sport is so extensive that two other articles are exclusively dedicated to them. See English language idioms derived from baseball and baseball metaphors for sex.

Examination of the ethnocultural relevance of these idioms in English speech in areas such as news and political discourse (and how "Rituals, traditions, customs are very closely connected with language and form part and parcel of the linguacultural 'realia'") occurs. The occurrence is of note for philologists, linguists. Phrases from sports are a "part of a nation’s linguoculture." where "members of common culture not only share the same information but also the methods of coding, storing and retrieving the information.

== B ==
ball (is) in one's court
Tennis: It's one's turn, or responsibility, to take action.
ballpark figure / in the ballpark
baseball: a rough estimate or approximation.
low/high bar; clear the bar; set the bar higher/lower
Track and field: A high bar refers metaphorically to a more difficult standard to achieve, while a low bar refers to an easier one. The related term "clearing the bar" refers to exceeding the standard, and setting the bar higher or lower refers to raising and lowering the standard, respectively. The term is derived from the sports of high jump and pole vault, where competitors are required to jump or vault over a bar in order to advance in the competition, with the bar raised by a small height after each round. A higher bar is more difficult to clear, both literally and metaphorically.

beat someone to the punch
Boxing: to anticipate and potentially preempt a competitor's move or action.

block and tackle
American football, rugby, etc: The basics, to get back to the basics. When referenced, it is usually speaking to changing the behavior or going back to an earlier time when things were functional or building basic skills to ensure the success of various endeavors. In some ball games (for example American or Canadian football, rugby, etc.), blocking and tackling are basic components of the game. In order to be successful in the game, a player must understand when to block and when to tackle. (Not the block and tackle system of cables and pulleys for lifting heavy loads.)

== C ==
call an audible
American football: To improvise, often in the spur of the moment. The term is based on the practice of changing a play right before the play is run in American football.
call the shots
Cue sports: To be the decision-maker, to have the final word.
carry the ball
American football, rugby, etc: To take charge, to assume responsibility. In some ball games (for example American or Canadian football, rugby, etc.), the ball can be carried to advance toward a goal. ADHI dates figurative usage from the "early 1900s". Compare drop the ball, below.
come out fighting or come out swinging
Boxing: To go immediately on the offensive, often pre-emptively; or, to strongly defend oneself or one's beliefs. CIDI,

== D ==
double-team
Basketball: to apply pressure from two different directions, in two different ways, and/or by two different elements at the same time.
down and out
Boxing: Lacking money or prospects; penniless or destitute. A boxer who is "down" has been knocked to the canvas, and one who is also "out" is unconscious or unable to resume the fight; thus a down-and-out boxer is utterly defeated. AHDI states the term "probably" came from boxing, circa 1900; OED references boxing rather obliquely, and cites first figurative usage to 1889.
down for the count; out for the count
Boxing: To be defeated. Refers to a boxer being knocked down; the referee will count off ten seconds, the time allotted for the boxer to regain his feet or lose the fight. Down for the count may imply a temporary setback, as down does not necessarily imply out. AHDI dates "down for the count" to the 1920s; OED cites out for the count to 1930. Compare take the full count, below.
down to the wire
Horse racing: To the very end or last minute. From the length of wire stretched across a racetrack at the finish line. AHDI dates its figurative use to about 1900.
drop the ball
Baseball, rugby, American football, etc: To make an error, to miss an opportunity. In games where a ball may be legally caught (e.g. baseball) or carried (e.g. American football), a player (or the player's team) may be penalized for dropping the ball; for example, an American football player who drops a ball ("fumbles") risks having the ball recovered and carried by the other team; in baseball, a player who drops a thrown or batted ball may be charged with an error. AHDI dates the figurative usage to about the 1950s. Compare carry the ball, above.
drop the gloves
Ice hockey: To engage in a fight, whether figurative or literal. Refers to the act of hockey players throwing off their gloves to punch with bare knuckles.

== E ==
end around
American football: An evasive tactic; an attempt to avoid or bypass opposition. In American football, it is an attempt to run around one's own end (of a line of players) and towards the goal. OED dates football usage to 1902, figurative to 1952.

== F ==
flood the zone
American Football: Filling a region on the field of play with the intention of overwhelming the defense.

fumble
American Football: To miss an opportunity or embarrass yourself by a simple mistake or error.

full-court press
Basketball: An all-out effort to exert pressure. In basketball, full-court press is an aggressive defence strategy in which the defenders put pressure on the opposing team over the entire court, trying to disrupt their dribbling and passing. It was widely used in this sense beginning in the late 1940s. AHDI cites the figurative usage to the "late 1900s". OED cites first basketball usage in 1976, and figurative usage in 1978, but the cite itself states that the term was used figuratively in "the late sixties".

== G ==
gambit
Boxing: A stratagem or tactic; chess: an opening system that involves a pawn sacrifice to gain the initiative right from the start. The term arrives in modern parlance through chess, but originates in wrestling from the Italian gambetto, tripping the opponent. OED cites the chess usage to 1656, the figurative usage to 1855.
get a second wind
Sailing: To muster another burst of power or energy after seeming to fade or tire.
get the ball rolling
Some ball games: To start an endeavour. Some ball games are started by rolling a ball into play. AHDI dates to the late 18th century. See also keep the ball rolling, below.
glass jaw
Boxing: Vulnerability, especially of a public figure, to destructive criticism. In boxing, a fighter who is especially vulnerable or susceptible to a knockout is said to have a glass jaw.
the gloves are off
Boxing, Hockey: See take off the gloves, below.
go the distance
Boxing: Carry through a course of action to completion. A boxer goes the distance when he can fight through all the scheduled rounds. OED cites the boxing idiom to 1934, but does not date its figurative usage.
go for an early bath
Association football, Rugby When a player is sent off for a serious foul or dismissable offence. The player therefore returns to the changing room and has an early bath or shower before the rest of the team. The phrase is sometimes modified to "go for an early shower".
go to the mat
Wrestling: to engage in an argument or dispute, especially until one side is victorious. In wrestling, it means to engage in a wrestling bout, the mat being the surface on which the contest is fought. OED cites the wrestling usage to 1908, the figurative to 1912; however, AHDI states it has been used in its figurative sense "since about 1900".
move the goalposts
Association football: to change plans or rules, thus making it difficult for others to achieve something.

== H ==
hands down
Horse racing: With great ease; unconditionally; often (and originally) in the phrase to win hands down, in which a jockey, certain of victory, drops his hands and relaxes his hold on the reins. The horse-racing phrase is first cited by OED in 1867, figurative usage in 1913.
Hail Mary
American football: A long shot, a desperate last-ditch attempt, as if relying on a prayer, specifically, the (Catholic) "Hail Mary" (Ave Maria). Usually a long pass into the end zone to win the game.
hat-trick
Cricket: A threefold feat in an endeavour. In cricket, a bowler who took three wickets with three successive bowls was entitled to a new hat (or some other prize) awarded by his club. OED cites to 1877, figuratively to 1909. Later used in many other team sports.
have someone in your corner
Boxing: To have the support or help of someone. A boxer's ringside support staff – second, cut man, etc. – are in his corner, and assist him between rounds.
heavy hitter
Boxing: An important or influential individual or organization. Refers to a boxer who is able to hit hard; The ability to end a bout with one swing; AHDI states it "was transferred to other enterprises in the mid-1900s".
heavyweight
Boxing: A person of great influence or importance. In boxing, it was historically a weight division of 175 pounds (79 kg) or higher, but the lower limit is now set at 200 pounds (91 kg); the term is also used for a boxer fighting in this division. OED dates the boxing usage to 1877, although it was used in newspapers as early as 1849. (It was previously used in horse-racing, and in wrestling as early as 1838). OED does not cite or date the figurative usage. See also lightweight, below.
hit below the belt
Boxing: To act unfairly or unscrupulously, in disregard of the rules. To hit an opponent below the belt is an illegal move in boxing. WNM dates this use to "1941–46"; Theidioms dates to 1891.
hole in one
Golf: To succeed in something on the first try, or accomplish something in a perfect way.
home stretch or homestretch
Horse racing: The final phase of an endeavour or project. On a racecourse, the home stretch is the final part of track on which the race finishes. OED dates racing usage to 1841, but does not date or cite a figurative usage; M-W defines a figurative use but does not date it.
hospital pass
Rugby: Passing the ball to a player who is already marked and sure to be tackled – implying being put into hospital by the severity of the inevitable tackle.
hurler on the ditch
Hurling: A non-participant who criticises from outside. Derives from a spectator (typically a man too old to play any more) criticising the players whilst observing from an earth bank (a ditch; most hurling clubs do not have stands so the crowd stands at the pitchside).

== I ==
in-fighting, infighting
Boxing: Close-quarter fighting. Also, conflict between members of the same organization, often concealed from outsiders. Infighting in boxing is fighting in close quarters; when the fighters are extremely close, it may sometimes be difficult for spectators (or even the referee) to see each blow. OED dates the boxing usage to 1812, and the first non-boxing meaning to 1928, and the first non-physical meaning to 1960. OED does not refer to the second meaning, which is the one stated (but undated) by AHD and WordNet.

== J ==
jump the gun
track and field: to be rash; to begin something prematurely, too soon, or before one is supposed or allowed to.

== K ==
keep one's eye on the ball
Ball games: To remain alert. In most games involving balls, it is important for players to keep track of the ball. AHDI dates to circa 1900.
keep the ball rolling (keep the ball bowling)
Some ball games: To keep a conversation or endeavour from flagging. In some games, the ball must be kept moving or play stops. AHDI dates to the late 18th century; See also get the ball rolling, above.
kisser
The mouth or face. Although the etymology is obvious – that which kisses – it apparently first appeared as boxing slang in 1860 (OED).
knock for six
Cricket To surprise or shock (someone). In cricket, a "six" results from a ball that is hit in the air and beyond the boundary of the field. It is the most valuable outcome for a batsman, being worth (as its name suggests) six runs from one delivery. The bowler who delivered the ball is said to have been "knocked for six".
knockout, knock-out
Boxing: In boxing a "knockout" is scored when one boxer "knocks out" another boxer, either by striking him unconscious, or knocking him to the canvas such that he cannot rise within a count of ten (a "technical knockout"). AHD derives the figurative term from the boxing in the "early 20th century"; OED does not. Both seem to suggest, however, that the verb phrase "knock out" or "knock someone out" predates boxing.
kayo, K.O.
Boxing: To put out of commission. From the boxing phrase "knockout" (knock unconscious), abbreviated "K.O." and pronounced and often written as "kayo". OED dates "K.O." to 1922, figurative use to 1923; "kayo" to 1923, figurative sense 1939. See knockout, below.

== L ==
lead with one's chin
Boxing: To speak without caution, or to leave oneself unprotected. Refers to a boxer leaving his chin, a vulnerable point, unprotected. AHDI dates this usage to the "mid-1900s"; OED cites Erle Stanley Gardner in 1949.
last man out
Baseball: a person who is ignored. Comes from when the team comes in and the last person comes straggling in feeling small and ashamed or disgraceful.
level the playing field
any sport: To create equal chances or opportunities for everyone to succeed.
light the lamp
Hockey: to score a goal. Comes from the red light behind the net that goes off when a goal is scored.
lightweight
Boxing: (A person or thing) of little importance, consequence, intelligence or ability. In boxing, it is a weight class for boxers weighing between 130 and 135 pounds (59.0 and 61.2 kg). OED cites boxing usage to 1823, figurative usage to 1885.
low blow
Boxing: An unscrupulous or unfair attack, action, or insult. Refers to an illegal blow aimed at the area below another boxer's waist or belt. Also known as "hitting below the belt". AHDI cites this usage to about 1950. See hit below the belt, above.

== M ==
missed an open goal/net
Association football/Hockey: to miss an easy opportunity. Relates to the act of failing to score when there is no-one protecting the goal.
Monday morning quarterback
American football: A person who criticizes or passes judgment with the benefit of hindsight. Monday morning refers to the games played or broadcast on Sunday, with criticisms leveled by commentators the following week. See also hindsight bias and quarterback, below. OED cites football usage to 1932.
mulligan
Golf: An opportunity to try something a second time after making an error on the first try.

== N ==
neck and neck
Horse racing : To be in a very close race or competition.
no holds barred
Wrestling: With all restrictions relaxed. The rules of wrestling bar or proscribe certain holds or grips on one's opponent. OED cites figurative usage to 1942, while AHDI indicates its wrestling origins.
by a nose
see win by a nose, below.

== O ==
offside
various team sports: An illegal or illegitimate position or situation.
on the ball
Association football: To be alert and aware of what is going on around you. Relates to the act of being in control of the ball in association football.
on the ropes
Boxing: On the verge of defeat. Refers to a boxer who has been knocked against the ropes that enclose the boxing ring and kept there by the blows of his opponent. OED cites the boxing usage to 1958, figurative use to 1970.
on the sidelines
see sideline, below.
one-two (punch), the old one-two
Boxing An attack consisting of two punches in rapid succession with alternate hands. OED cites boxing usage to 1811, figurative usage to 1948. The phrase the old one-two is cited in 1960, but quotes it from "a more vulgarly robust age".
out for the count
See down for the count, above.:: out in left field: Baseball: Someone who is not where they should be or does not understand something. In baseball, left field (or right field) is as far as one can get from home as possible.
out of left field
Baseball: Something that comes or happens by surprise, suddenly, or from a blind spot.
out of the park, to hit it out of the park
Baseball: To be wildly successful, to exceed expectations.

== P ==
par for the course
Golf: Typical; what is expected. Derived from the literal meaning of par for the course in golf.
Political football
Association football: an issue in politics that is continually debated but is yet to be resolved.
pull one's punches
Boxing: To use less force than one is capable of; to be gentle or lenient. In boxing, a boxer who holds back from using all his strength is said to pull his punches. Often used in a negative sense, in the phrase "pull no punches". The boxing term dates to 1934, the figurative to 1937 (OED).
punch-drunk
Boxing: dazed, bewildered, or confused; or behaving in such a manner. In boxing, it refers to Dementia pugilistica, a neurological disorder in boxers triggered by repeated dazing blows or punches to the head over an extended period of time; symptoms include dementia, inappropriate behaviour, slurring of speech, etc., which resemble symptoms of alcoholic intoxication (hence punch-drunk). Figuratively, it refers to a state of dazedness or confusion resulting from fatigue, overwork, burnout, continuous exposure to unpleasant situations, or perhaps even emotional upheaval, as in suffering repeated figurative blows to one's ego, emotional well-being, etc. OED dates the boxing usage to 1918, the figurative to 1934. See punchy, slap-happy, below.
punchy
Boxing: See punch-drunk, above; also, in a state of nervous tension, fatigued. OED cites as synonym for "punch-drunk" to 1937, alternate meaning to 1943. See punch-drunk, above, slap-happy, below.
punt
American Football: Used to convey that things aren't going as planned and it is time to step back and reassess the situation.
push it over the goal line
American Football: Complete the activity or project, finish the job. Work often has little value until its completion. In American football, a team's drive to move the football down the field does not count until the ball crosses the goal line.
put some points on the board
American Football: Show some impact or progress in a project. In American Football, teams can spend an inordinate amount of time moving the ball up and down the field without scoring.

== Q ==
quarterback
American football: One who directs or leads; a mastermind; also used as a verb, to quarterback. It is also used as a term for a supporter or critic of a team or game, and by extension, an uninvolved observer who criticizes or second-guesses; see Monday morning quarterback, above. In American football, the quarterback is the player on the field responsible for coordinating and directing play, and the one to whom the ball is snapped at the beginning of each play. OED cites figurative use of "leader" to 1961; it dates the verb usage to 1952, a cite which in itself cites the term to 1945.

== R ==
(being given/shown a) red card
Association football: being expelled, banned, restricted, sent off.
ringer
Horse racing: An impostor, especially one who misrepresents his or her identity or ability in order to gain an advantage in a competition. In horse racing, when a fast horse was substituted for a slower one that it resembled (a "ring-in"). The term now applies to any athlete entered in a team competition under false pretenses or musician in an ensemble or orchestra in order to gain a competitive advantage by strengthening the team or to improve the quality of the performance. In competitive video gaming this is called smurfing.
ringside judge
Boxing: A person who follows a topic or situation closely. In boxing, the ringside judges who score a boxing match sit at the ringside table (see below), and thus have an excellent view of the proceedings. OED cites this use to 1976.
ringside seat, ringside table
Boxing: A place providing a good view of something. In boxing, a ringside seat is immediately adjacent to the ring in which the boxers fight, as is the ringside table, at which the ringside judges (see above) sit. OED cites ringside seat to 1934, ringside table to 1929.
roll with the punches
Boxing: To take adversity in stride; to adapt to difficult circumstances. A boxer who "rolls with the punches" moves his body away from the force of a blow so as to lessen their impact. OED cites the boxing term to 1941, the figurative to 1956.
round
Boxing: A single phase of an endeavour or contest: "The defence attorney started round two by filing a writ of habeas corpus." Also, an encounter, often confrontational, as in the phrase go a few rounds or go a couple of rounds: "I went a couple of rounds with the ex-wife's lawyer." A round in boxing is one of a set number of short contests (usually three minutes) that make up the entire match. OED dates the boxing term to 1812, extends it to battling animals in 1846, then to a figurative sense in 1937.
run interference
American football: To handle problems for another person or to clear the way for another. In American football, a player who runs interference interferes or obstructs opponents to let the ball carrier advance. AHDI dates the usage to the mid-20th century.

== S ==
saved by the bell
Boxing: to be saved from misfortune or unpleasantness by a timely interruption. Alludes to a boxer who is knocked to the canvas, and must regain his feet before a count of ten or lose the contest; if the bell signalling the end of the round is rung before the count is finished, the fighter now has until the start of the next round to recover and resume fighting. ADHI dates this to the "mid-1900s"; OED cites first boxing use in 1932, figurative use in 1959.
score an own goal
Association football: To do something that has the unintended effect of harming your own interests. Relates to the act of scoring a goal for the opposition in association football, usually unintentionally.
sideline; on/from the sidelines
Sports: To not participate, remain neutral or passive, avoid action. A player who it is injured, benched, etc. is removed from play and forced to sit on or observe from the sidelines. The sidelines themselves are the lines on the side of the playing field which define the playing area from that of spectators, non-playing team members, etc. OED defines sidelines in terms of "spec[ifically] Football and other sports", figurative use from 1934. See also bench.
slam dunk, slam-dunk
Basketball: A forceful, dramatic move, especially against someone. In basketball, it is a forceful shot in which the player jumps to the basket and slams the ball in. OED only cites the basketball definition, and that to 1976; AHDI cites a figurative usage from "about 1980 on". Figurative usage commonly includes the sense of "can't miss", a sure thing.
slap-happy
Boxing: Synonym for punch-drunk, above; also, dizzy with happiness; carefree, casual, thoughtless, irresponsible. The "punch-drunk" meaning OED cites to 1936; the "dizzy" meaning appears two years later. The "carefree…etc" connotation appears in 1937; it appears the evolution of the idiomatic meaning was influenced by the element "happy" over that of "slap".
sparring partner
Boxing: A person with whom one routinely argues or enjoys arguing. Refers to a boxer who is hired to practise with another for training purposes. Other phrases such as "sparring match" (for a verbal argument), and even the verb "to spar" (to bandy words), may actually come from cockfighting.
spike the football
Gridiron Football: To celebrate a victory or win, often excessively. It derives from the American Football practice of enthusiastically throwing or spiking the ball against the ground when a touchdown is scored.
square off
Boxing: To assume a fighting stance or attitude. In boxing, the term derives from the square shape of the ring, and the stance fighters assume immediately before the fight commences. AHD derives the figurative use from boxing in a note at the entry knockout. OED does not specifically refer to boxing, but cites a physical fighting usage to 1838 and a figurative in 1873.
Step up to the plate
Baseball: To take responsibility, or volunteer for a task.
Sticky wicket
Cricket: a metaphor used to describe a difficult circumstance. It originated as a term to describe difficult playing conditions caused by a damp and soft pitch which was rapidly drying.
Stumped
Cricket: To be confused or undecided. In cricket, to be out due to the wicket-keeper disrupting the stumps with the batsman being out of their crease. Batsmen who are out stumped often do not realise immediately what has happened, because they have played at but missed the ball and have their back to the wicket keeper.
sucker punch
Boxing: An unexpected blow. In boxing, a sucker punch is one delivered unexpectedly. OED dates boxing term to 1947, but does not cite first figurative usage.
Sunday punch
Boxing: A destructive blow to an opponent as in "knocked him into next Sunday". In boxing, a Sunday punch is a knockout blow. WordNet refers to it specifically in terms of boxing. OED cites a meaning as a knockout punch to 1929, figurative use to 1944, but does not ascribe it to the sport of boxing directly.

== T ==
take a dive
Boxing: To pretend or feign, with intent to deceive. Refers to boxers who would pretend to be knocked out by a light or even non-existent punch, thus intentionally losing the fight; this was one method of losing a "fixed" fight (one with an unlawfully prearranged outcome, for gambling purposes). OED gives the boxing reference as 1952, the non-boxing in 1982. Also in association football.
take it on the chin
Boxing: To suffer misfortune or defeat. It alludes to taking a physical blow on the chin; AHDI dates this usage to the "first half of [the] 1900s"; OED, however, qualifies this definition, adding "courageously", and citing its first use to 1928.
take off the gloves
Boxing, ice hockey: To attack earnestly, without mercy. Boxing gloves are worn for protection of the boxer's hands and to lessen the impact of the punches; bare-knuckle boxing is much more savage and dangerous. Used also in ice hockey, as two (or more) players signal their intention to fight by dropping their gloves. Often used as in the gloves are off, meaning the fight or dispute has escalated (CIDI). This phrase may derive from earlier forms; the boxing sense OED cites to 1922, the figurative to 1928.
take one's eye off the ball
Ball sports: To lose one's concentration on what is most important. Originates from general sporting advice to look continuously at the ball as it moves.
take the (full) count
Boxing: To be defeated. Refers to a boxer being knocked down, the referee counting off ten seconds, the time allotted for the boxer to regain his feet or lose the fight. A boxer who takes the full count accepts defeat. OED cites this usage in 1902. Compare down for the count, above.
throw in the towel
Boxing: To surrender, admit defeat. Originally throw up the sponge or chuck up the sponge; OED cites "from the practice of throwing up the sponge used to cleanse the combatants' faces, at a prize~fight, as a signal that the ‘mill’ is concluded." (1860) The phrase throw in the towel in a non-boxing sense first dates to 1916 in a book by C. J. Dennis.
throw one's hat into the ring
Boxing: To signify one's candidacy for (political) office or election; to enter a contest. In early days of boxing, one signified a challenge by throwing one's hat into the boxing ring. AHDI cites the boxing use to 1900; OED cites the figurative to 1928.

== U ==
under the wire
Horse racing: At the last moment; in the nick of time; barely within some accepted parameters or limits. "The report was handed in just under the wire." Or, "At five-foot-five, he was under the wire for the height requirement for enlistment." From the practice of stretching a wire over the finish line at a racetrack. AHDI dates to the first half of the 20th century; OED dates the horse-racing term to 1889 and the figurative sense to 1929.
underdog
dog fighting: a person or group entering a conflict, competition, or race, expected to lose.

== W ==
win by a nose
Horse racing: To succeed by a narrow margin. "Our bid for the construction contract won by a nose." In horse racing, it describes a win so close that only the nose of the winning horse came in ahead of the other. AHDI dates the sports usage to about 1900, the figurative to sometime after 1950. OED, however, cites a literal usage in 1851, but does not cite a figurative usage until 1997, and that in the phrase "lost by a nose."
work out, work-out, workout
Boxing: To exercise or practice, especially in terms of physical training; also, the act of working out. Work out was a term for boxing for practice as opposed to a set contest.

== Y ==
(being given/shown a) yellow card
Association football: being cautioned, getting a warning.

== See also ==
- Glossary of English-language idioms derived from baseball
- Baseball metaphors for sex
