= Grapple tackle =

Rugby tackling technique

A grapple tackle is a controversial tackling technique used in rugby league. It has gained notoriety in Australia's National Rugby League competition whereby the tackler attempts to impede the ball carrier by applying a chokehold-like grip. Although players can be penalised for its use, it is difficult to enforce.

== Mechanics ==
A grapple tackle has two distinct variations, both of which are illegal under the laws of the game. Note that a simple chokehold or headlock is tolerated within the game.

- Type A (a true grapple tackle) involves a defender, usually the third to arrive, applying pressure to the attacking player's neck with the bony part of his forearms. He then proceeds to 'untwist' his arms in order to twist the players neck. The idea is to prevent the attacker from falling onto his stomach from where he can quickly play the ball. Instead, he must turn with the player twisting his neck onto his back. The third defender, now with the attacker's 'backhead' in his stomach and still with his arms placed around the player's neck, then puts his entire weight onto the player's head by shifting his weight off his legs. This enables the previous defenders considerable time to retreat the 10m; because of the pressure on the neck the attacker is 'stunned'. A prolonged hold of this sort can cause disorientation and even unconsciousness.
- Type B (more common but less effective) involves only two players. The first defender makes a traditional 'ball-and-all' tackle, locking the ball up. The second defender then tries to put all of his weight into twisting the attacking player onto his back. Sometimes, it involves using a 'chokehold' where one arm is wrapped around the throat. However, this technique has been used in rugby league for years, and is not a true grapple tackle. It only becomes a problem when a player uses the 'crushing' aspect outlined above, where he puts all of his weight onto the back of the attacker's head/neck. This tackle is usually ignored by most referees, because it happens far more quickly, and most attackers actually contribute to their own demise by looking to offload the ball.

== See also ==
- Spear tackle - another controversial tackling technique
- Dump tackle
- High tackle
- Grappling hold

== See also ==
- Tackle (football move)
