= The Rules of the Game (disambiguation) =

The Rules of the Game is a 1939 French film, directed by Jean Renoir.

(The) Rules of the Game may also refer to:

- "Rules of the Game" (song), a 1983 single by Bucks Fizz
- Rules of the Game (book), a 2007 book by Neil Strauss
- Rules of the Game (film), a 2014 British film
- The Rules of the Game (play), a 1918 play by Luigi Pirandello
- Rules of the Game (TV series), a 2022 British television drama
- "The Rules of the Game" (Crusade), a 1999 television episode
- "The Rules of the Game", a 2006 episode of the television show The Game
- "Rules of the Game" (Sliders), a 1996 television episode
- "Rules of the Game" (Suits), a 2011 television episode
- The rules of a mind game called The Game

== See also ==
- The Rule of the Game, a 2002 Taiwanese film
- Laws of the Game (disambiguation)
