= Line-out (rugby union) =

Restart of play after the ball has gone into touch

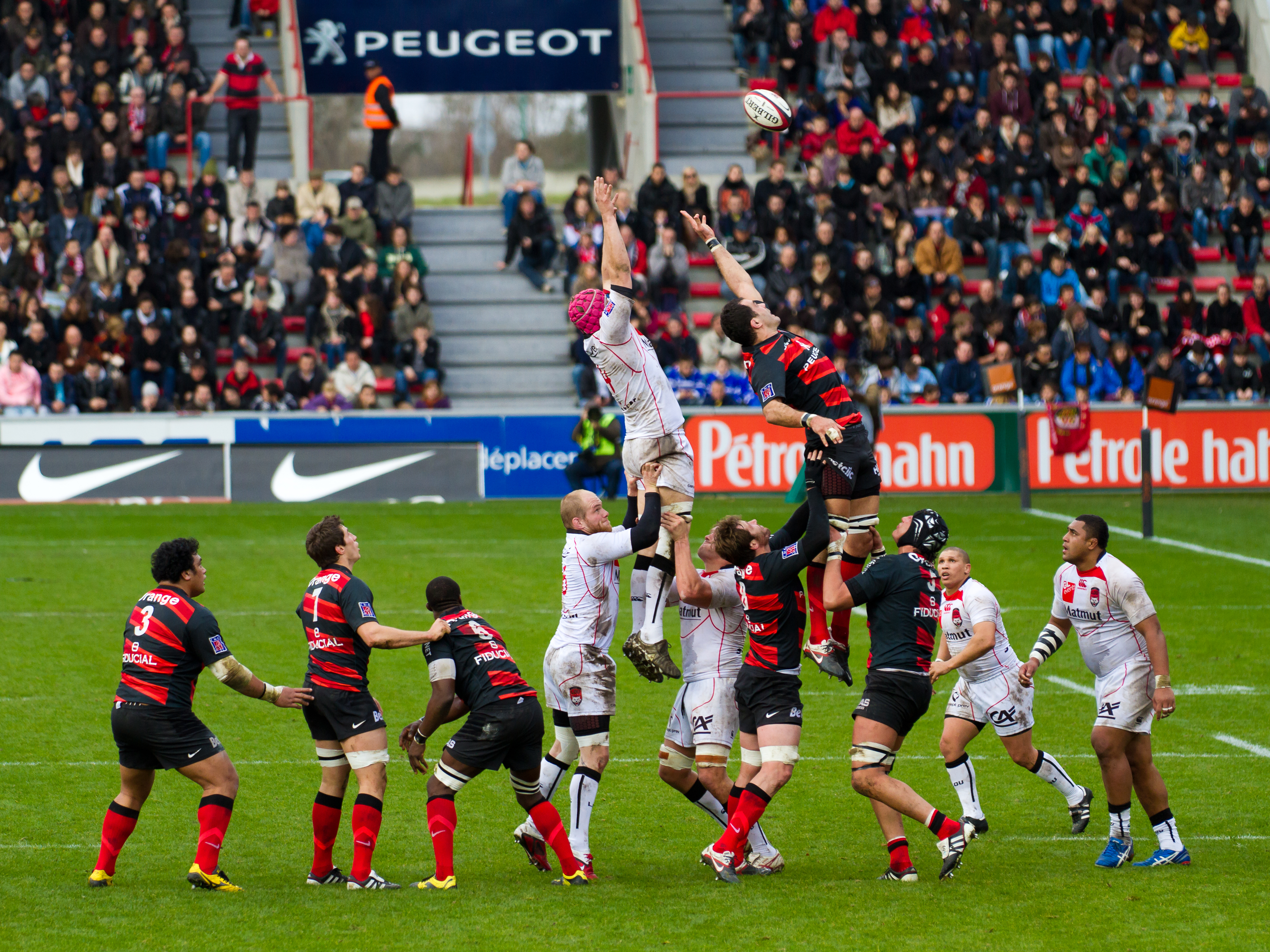
Line-out, Toulouse vs. Lyon OU, in a Top 14 match at Stade Ernest-Wallon

A line-out or lineout is a means by which, in rugby union, play is restarted after the ball has gone into touch. When the ball goes out of the field of play, the opposing team is normally awarded a line-out; the exception is after the ball is kicked into touch from a penalty kick, when the team that was awarded the penalty throws into the line-out. In 2021 World Rugby began to trial what was dubbed the "50:22" (or "50–22") rule, wherein the kicking team has the throw-in if the ball travels from the kicker's half and bounces beyond the opposing 22-metre line. This was inspired by rugby league's 40/20 kick.

A line-out is formed by players from each team lining up inside the touchline, at 90° to it. A player from the side that did not put the ball into touch then throws the ball back into play.

A line-out is one of the two methods of restarting play after the ball has gone into touch, the other is the "quick throw-in" (sometimes referred to as a quick line-out). Due to the specific rules placed on quick throw-ins they are uncommon in a rugby match, with the majority of restarts from touch taking the form of a line-out.

== Line-outs ==
=== Position of line-out ===
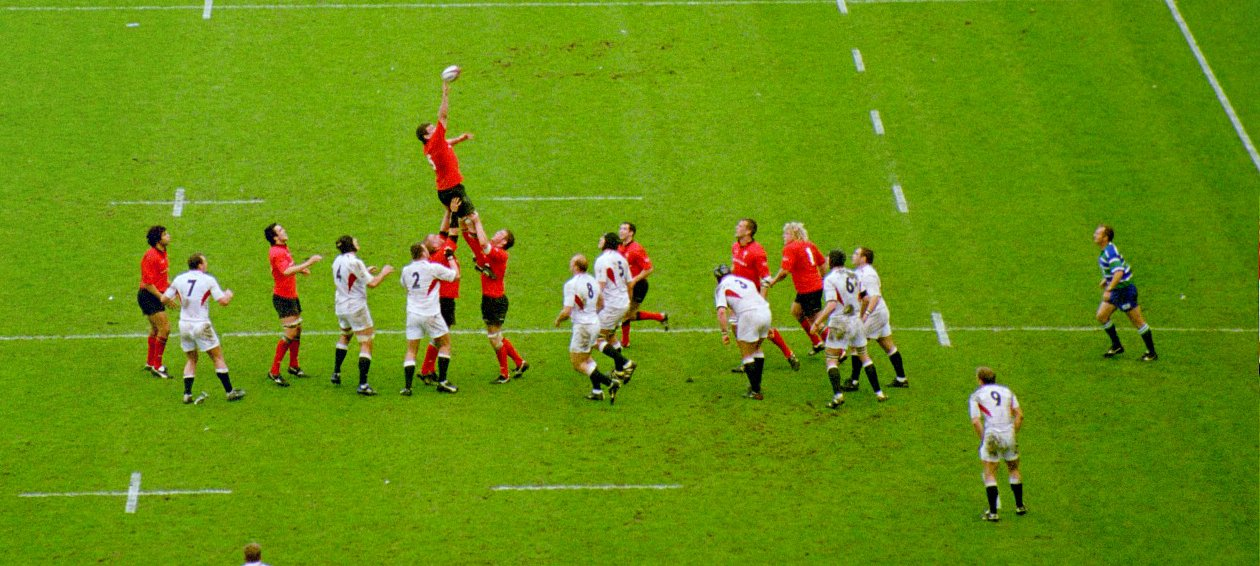
Wales (red) win a lineout against England in the 2004 Six Nations Championship. England have chosen not to compete for the ball in the air, but are ready to drive into the ball carrier when he lands.

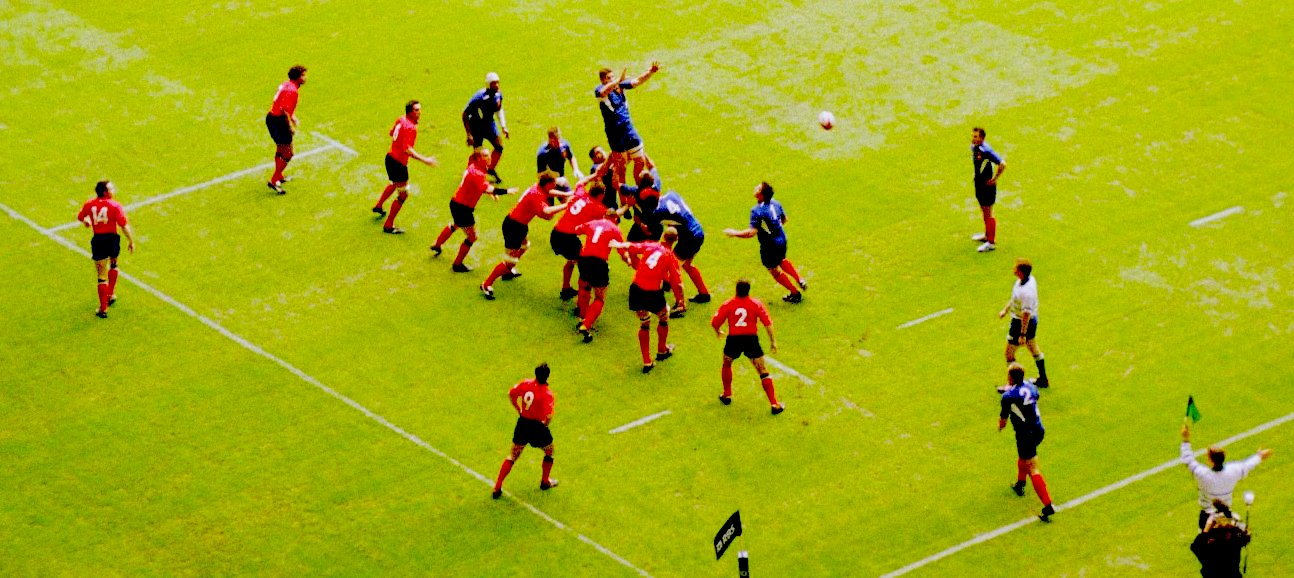
In this line attacking line-out, France (blue) threatens on the 5 metre line, and the Welsh defence mass to stop the drive. Note that the non-throwing hooker (#2, Red) is obliged to stand within 5 metres of the touch line. Six Nations, 2004

Where the line-out is taken depends on the manner in which the ball was played into touch. If it is kicked directly into touch, without first landing in the field-of-play or touching the referee or an opponent who is not in touch, the line-out is formed in line with the spot from where it was kicked, with two exceptions: if the kick was a penalty kick or if the kicker had at least one foot on or behind his own 22-metre line, the line-out is formed at the spot where the ball crossed the touch-line. In all other cases, the line-out is formed at the spot where the ball crossed the touch-line, except that if this spot is within 5 metres of the goal-line, the line-out is formed on the 5-metre line. A line-out is also awarded if a player in possession of the ball crosses or touches the touchline whilst still in possession of the ball.

A player in the line-out will attempt either to catch the ball or to knock it back to a "receiver", a player from their own side (often the scrum-half but sometimes another forward) who is standing close to the line-out on their side of the pitch and in a position to receive such a ball. Each team may have, at most, one receiver at a line-out.

Players not forming part of the line-out, or acting as receiver, must stay at least 11 yards (10 m) behind the line at which the line-out is formed until the line-out is over; the only exception is if the line-out is formed within 11 yards of a team's goal-line, when they need only retreat behind the goal-line. A line-out ends when the ball, or a player carrying it, leaves the line-out, or, if a ruck or maul is formed at the line-out, when all the feet of all the players forming the ruck or maul move beyond the line of touch.

The line-out was originally contested with both teams jumping unsupported to retrieve the ball. However, lifting in the line-out was legalised in 1999 under Law 18 of the World Rugby laws.

Players must not interfere with the opposition during the line-out. In particular, they must not interfere with or tackle a jumper while his feet are off the ground, or interfere with players supporting him; such actions are deemed to be dangerous play and will be penalised with a penalty kick. Players in the line-out must not close the gap or enter the gap, except in the act of jumping for the ball, nor may they jump or support a jumper before the ball is thrown; such actions are penalised with a free-kick. Penalty kicks and free kicks are awarded 15 metres infield from the touch-line.

If the ball is thrown beyond the 15-metre line, a player from the throwing team who is not taking part in the line-out may run forward to take the ball. If he does so, an opponent may also run forward to contest possession. Players who are taking part in the line-out may move beyond the 15-metre line as soon as the ball leaves the thrower's hands. If, however, a player runs forward or infield and the ball is not thrown beyond the 15-metre line, that player is off-side. The line-out ends when the ball crosses the 15-metre line.

Players from the side not throwing may jump to compete for the ball, though they must be careful not to attract a penalty for interfering with an opposing jumper. Alternatively, they may choose not to contest the line-out but to drive onto the catcher as soon as he returns to the ground. Often, when a team is awarded a line-out close to their opponent's goal-line, they will attempt to form a maul around the catcher and drive over the goal-line to score a try. In such cases, the defending team will often seek to disrupt this tactic by driving in on the catcher, taking him to ground immediately, before a maul can form.

=== Tactics ===
Teams usually employ a line-out code, to ensure that all players on that team know what is planned, who the ball will be thrown to, what that player will do with it, and what follow-up play is intended. One player from the throwing team is usually designated to shout the code, and it is particularly important that the thrower should know what the code is, so that he can execute the throw as intended.

== Quick throw-in ==
A quick throw-in may be taken without waiting for a line-out to be formed. For a quick throw-in to be legal, the ball can not have been touched by any other person (player or non-player), apart from the player taking the throw or the opponent who may have carried the ball into touch and it can only be taken between the point of the ball leaving the field and the thrower's own goal line, unless a kick-off or restart kick goes straight into touch, in which case the ball may be taken up to the 50 metre line. If a line-out begins to form before the quick throw-in is taken the throw-in is not permitted. To prevent quick throw-ins, members of the opposing team will often race to the point where the ball went into touch to ensure a line-out is forming. In a quick throw-in the player throwing the ball back into play cannot send the ball forward towards the opponent's goal line. However, unlike a line-out, the ball may be thrown back in the direction of the player's own goal line.

== See also ==
- Ball back
- Offside (rugby)

== General and cited references ==
- "What is a line-out?". BBC Sport. 14 September 2005.
- "A Beginner's Guide to Rugby Union". World Rugby.
- "Set Pieces". Rugby Football Union.
- Bolton, Paul (24 October 2007). "American Hero's Rugby Legacy". The Daily Telegraph.
