= Dump tackle =

Tackling technique in rugby

The dump tackle, also known as dumping, tipping, or a tip tackle is a popular tackling technique used in rugby football. The tackler wraps their arms around the ball carrier's thighs and lifts them a short distance in the air before forcibly driving them to the ground. The move is frowned upon in many rugby communities as a dangerous tackling technique, as it puts the player being tackled at risk of a spine, neck, or head injury. However, the move is still popular in some places, and is often considered a crowd-pleaser.

A similar tackle to the dump tackle is the spear tackle, a more dangerous (and illegal) move. This can be done by adding additional rotation to the player being tackled, causing the player to hit the ground head or neck first.

== Rugby Union ==
According to World Rugby rules, "a player must not lift an opponent off the ground and drop or drive that player so that their head and/or upper body make contact with the ground." This applies to both dump tackles and spear tackles, although the calling of a penalty for these tackles is up to the discretion of the referee. Illegal dump tackles can be penalized with a yellow card, red card, or penalty only depending on the severity of the tackle and the danger to the player being tackled.

In an effort to reduce tackle-related injuries, World Rugby has emphasized to referees the importance of penalizing players who use this tackle technique dangerously.

== Rugby League ==
The spear, dump or tip tackle covers a range of tackling techniques illegal in rugby league. A player is guilty of misconduct if they "uses any dangerous throw when affecting a tackle," which includes any lifting of the player being tackled beyond the horizontal (i.e., a spear tackle). As per Rugby League International Federation (IRLF) laws,

"Dangerous throw (d) If, in any tackle of, or contact with, an opponent that player is so lifted that he is placed in a position where it is likely that the first part of his body to make contact with the ground will be his head or neck (“the dangerous position”), then that tackle or contact will be deemed to be a dangerous throw unless, with the exercise of reasonable care, the dangerous position could not have been avoided."

== See also ==
- Tackle (football move)
- Spear tackle - similar to a dump tackle
- Grapple tackle - another controversial tackling technique
- High tackle
- Glossary of rugby league terms
- Glossary of rugby union terms
- One on one tackle
