= Line-out code =

Coded piece of information

A line-out code is a coded piece of information, used to communicate intentions about a line-out within one team in a rugby union match without giving information away to the other team. A line-out is a manoeuvre used to restart play when the ball has left the pitch. The right to throw in the ball will be awarded to one team or the other but, in theory at least, the throw will be straight down the middle whichever team is making it. The advantage comes from knowing in advance how the throw will be made — whether short and fast to the front of the line or looping slowly to the back.

== Encoded information ==
=== Receiver selection ===
The most important piece of information to be encoded is to where in the line the ball is to be thrown. This allows the receiving players to concentrate their effort in lifting the relevant catcher, whereas the opposition must attempt to cover the whole line.

=== Post-catch action ===
As well as the length of the throw, some teams will attempt to specify what the catcher should do with the ball when he has it - whether to simply knock it back towards his own team, catch it and then pass it while still up in the air (supported by his team mates) or catch it and bring it down to form a maul. Such a call can only be advice to the catcher, since he may not get a clean catch and the choice of what to do.

=== Set pieces ===
Finally, the code may have a means of calling for a specific pre-planned move. This is usually just a particular word - the play won't be used often enough in a match for the opposition to work out what the word means. For example, the code-word "postman" might indicate that the ball is to be caught by the jumper (typically number four) and held briefly while a player from the back of the line-out runs along the line. As he passes the catcher the ball is passed down to him, he continues on to the front of the line, and slips through the gap between the front of the line and the edge of the pitch.

== Encoding methods ==
There are a wealth of different codes in use to obfuscate the planned tactic. One scheme uses a set of three words which share no letters (e.g. "THAMES ROWING CLUB" or "THE BIG DON"). The first word will signify the front of the line, the second the middle, and the third the back of the line. The call will then incorporate a letter from one of the words, indicating where the throw will be made. There are also numerical codes, and more esoteric ones involving anything from the number of legs on animals to the personal characteristics of people known to the team.

These basic elements will be combined by the caller into a phrase intended to confuse the opposition while transferring the plan to his team. Most of this phrase will be "padding" intended to hide the true method - for example, "127 ZD Kangaroo" could be decoded simply as a throw to the front of the line.
