= Laws of football (disambiguation) =

Laws of football may refer to:

- Laws of rugby league
- Laws of rugby union
- Laws of the Game (association football)
- Laws of Australian rules football
- American football rules
