= Laws of the Game =

The Laws of the Game may refer to:

== Sports ==
The Laws of the Game may refer to the codified rules of a number of different sports:

- Laws of the Game (association football)
- Laws of Australian rules football
- Bandy Playing Rules
- Rules of chess
- Laws of cricket
- Laws of rugby league
- Laws of rugby union

== Other uses ==
The Laws of the Game, title of a book by Manfred Eigen and Ruthild Winkler

== See also ==
- Laws of football (disambiguation)
- Sports law for legal aspects of sports
