= Hospital pass =

Football terminology

"Hospital pass" or "Hospital ball" is a term used in various football codes, including Australian rules football, American football, rugby league, and rugby union, to describe a pass that subjects the recipient to heavy contact, usually unavoidable, from an opposing player — the expression implying that the recipient of the pass could end up in hospital. The term has also been applied to similar passes between teammates in other sports including ice hockey, lacrosse, and ultimate. However, in ice hockey, a play leading to a hospital pass is typically described as a suicide pass.

The phrase hospital pass is now used metaphorically outside of sports.

== Rugby league and rugby union ==
A hospital pass is usually made in an attempt to avoid being tackled. The pass is often made under pressure and without considering the situation of the receiver, who is often stationary and thus presents an easy target. Alternatively, the passer is under little pressure but misreads the play and passes to a player who is already heavily marked and has little time to avoid contact.

== Australian rules football ==
To be considered a hospital pass, the ball is passed with minimal accuracy or timing and likely to result in injury to the receiver due to heavy contact. Hospital passes are typically made by handballing or kicking the ball towards a teammate in a high, looping trajectory or very slowly across the ground. This can enable opponents to contest for possession, resulting in heavy contact that is often, but not always, legitimate. The high, lobbed pass is considered particularly undesirable, because it gives opponents the chance to make very strong tackles, and, as it requires the catcher to raise their arms above their head, leaves their torso unprotected.

== American football ==
One play in American football that often results in a "hospital pass" is a pass thrown high to a receiver, generally one that is running sideways rather than running downfield. The receiver is forced to jump while running at full speed to catch the ball. A defender coming the other way, attempting to tackle the receiver, can cause a collision where both players are moving at full speed and the receiver is unable to move out of the way.

== Metaphorical usage ==
- Cricket: "...when Steve Waugh...handed over the captaincy to Ricky Ponting, he sent down one of sport's great hospital passes."
- Business: "Fyfe denies he was thrown 'hospital pass' "
- Politics: "The big Brown hospital pass..."
- Law: the term is used by barristers to denote a complex or difficult case passed on by a colleague, usually at short notice.
- Brexit: "Ireland is not going to be given a hospital pass."
