= High tackle =

Illegal move in rugby football

A high tackle is an illegal tackling move in rugby football. A high tackle occurs when a player tackles or attempts to tackle an opponent whereby their arm makes contact with the ball carrier’s chest. The move is dangerous due to the risk of injury to the head and neck of the player being tackled.

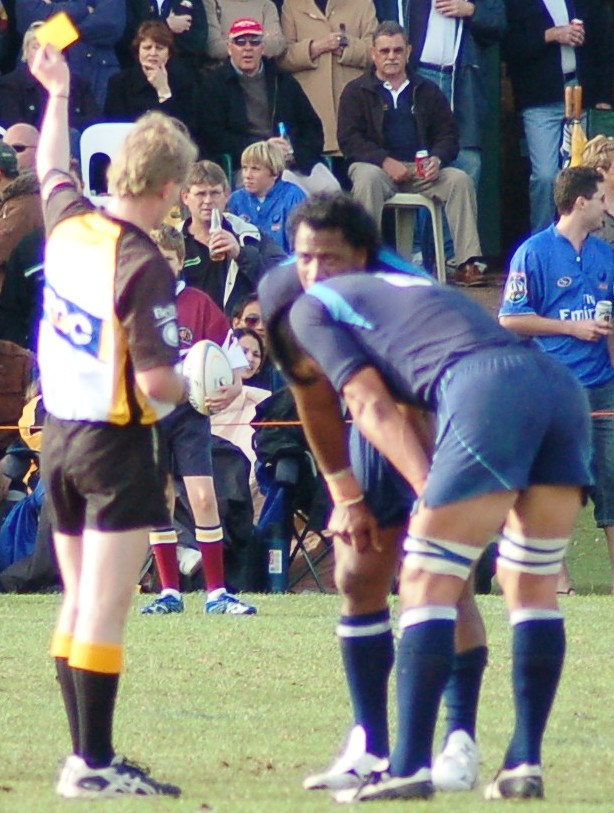
A rugby union referee gives a yellow card to a player for a rule infraction.

== Rugby Union ==
High tackles are illegal in all variations of rugby union play, including sevens variation and tens variation. According to World Rugby laws, "a player must not tackle an opponent early, late or dangerously. Dangerous tackling includes, but is not limited to, tackling or attempting to tackle an opponent above the line of the shoulders even if the tackle starts below the line of the shoulders." A player may receive a range of sanctions in response to an illegal high tackle, ranging from a penalty, yellow card, or red card. As per a 2011 World Rugby memorandum on the topic,

"A player must not tackle (or try to tackle) an opponent above the line of the shoulders even if the tackle starts below the line of the shoulders. A tackle around the opponent’s neck or head is dangerous play."

Reducing player injuries sustained from high tackles has long been a goal of World Rugby. In May 2019, World Rugby released a decision-making framework for high tackles to assist players and referees in avoiding illegal high tackles and appropriately sanctioning players who commit this infraction. The result of the framework's implementation was a 37% reduction in the number of tackle-related concussion incidents per 1,000 player hours at the 2019 World Cup compared to the previous year, with an overall 28% reduction in concussion incidents.

In August of 2019, World Rugby announced that reducing tackle height to waist level was one of several trial laws under consideration for implementation by the Rugby World Cup in 2023. Under the new rule, any tackle above the waist would now be considered a high tackle. The rationale for this rule change offered by World Rugby is that "forcing players to tackle lower may reduce the risk of head injuries to both the tackler and tackled player," as well as encouraging more offloads and expansive play. Initial trials of this rule change from the Fédération Française de Rugby (FFR) has had positive results, showing that reduction of permissible tackling to waist height reduces the number of head impacts and player injuries.

== Rugby League ==
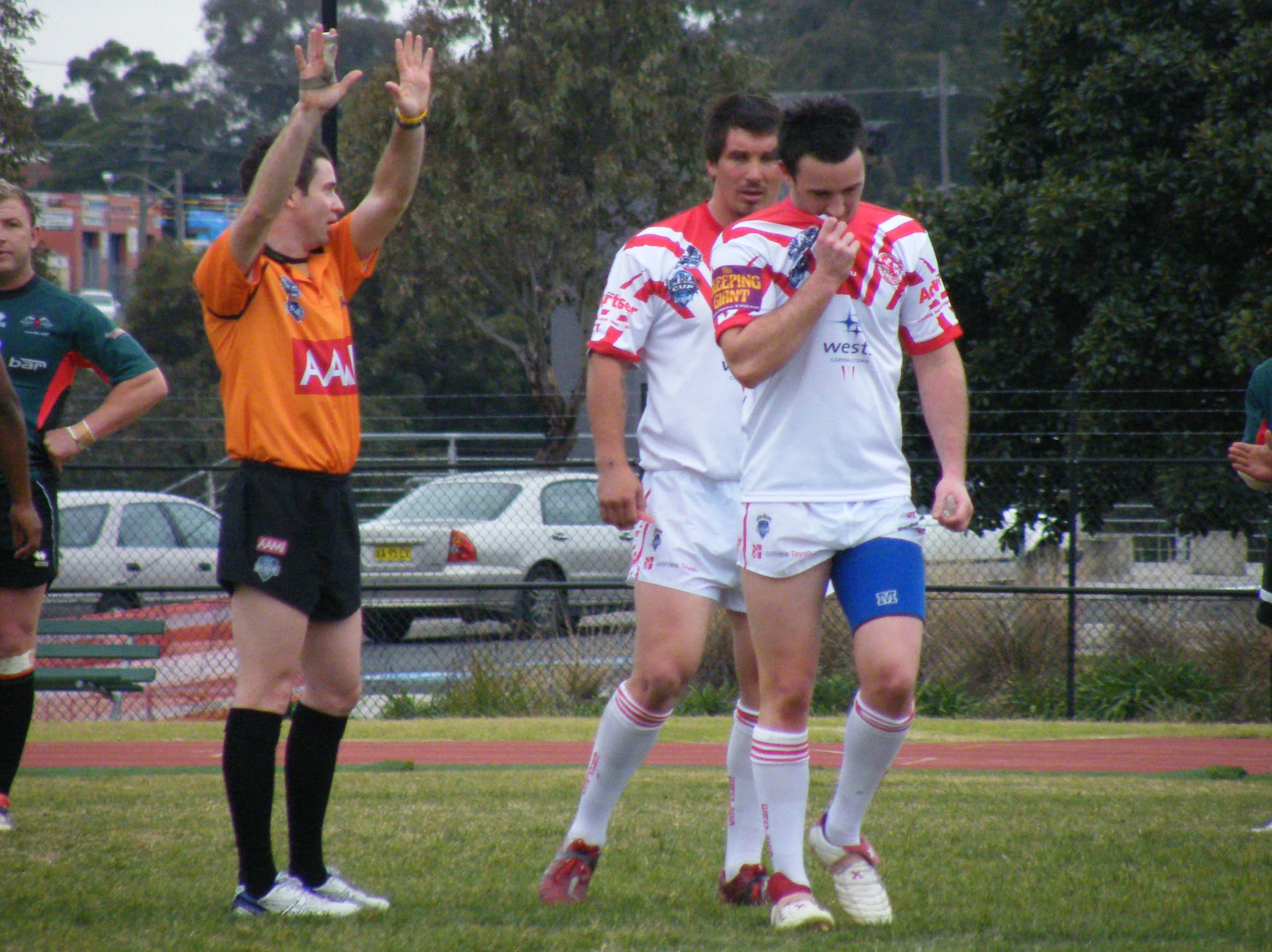
A referee gives a penalty ruling to a player in a rugby league match.

High tackles are illegal in rugby league play. As per International Rugby League (IRL) laws, a player is guilty of misconduct if they, "when effecting or attempting to effect a tackle makes contact with the head or neck of an opponent intentionally, recklessly or carelessly."

In 2019, the Australian Rugby League Commission (ARLC), the governing body of the National Rugby League (NRL) cracked down on 'crusher tackles', a particularly dangerous type of high tackle in which a defender forces a player’s head towards their torso in contact. Numerous similar crackdowns on types of dangerous tackles, like high tackles, have occurred in an effort to make the game safer.

A related infraction in rugby league is the shoulder charge, which involves contact to the shoulder or upper arm without an attempt to tackle. A player is guilty of misconduct if they use a shoulder charge, which is defined as when "a defender, without attempting to tackle, grab or hold the ball-carrier (or any opposing player) using the arms or hands, makes direct physical contact with the shoulder or the upper arm (tucked into the side)."

== See also ==
- Penalty box
- Glossary of rugby league terms
- Glossary of rugby union terms
- Dump tackle
- Spear tackle
