= Crash ball =

Tactic in rugby league and rugby union

Animation showing how the crash ball technique can be used by the blue team to force two defenders of the red team to commit to a tackle creating a gap in the defensive line

The crash ball is an attacking tactic in rugby league and rugby union where a player receives a pass at pace and runs to the opposition's defensive line. The crash ball runner attempts to commit two or more opposing players to the tackle, then attempts to make the ball available to teammates by offloading in the tackle, performing a quick play-the-ball in rugby league, or recycling the ball quickly from the ruck in rugby union. By committing players to the tackle, the crash ball runner creates holes in the opposition's defense, thereby creating attacking opportunities for teammates.

The crash ball is a common tactic in rugby league, especially amongst props and second rowers. In rugby union, crash ball running is often performed by midfielders as a way to create space for the outside backs.

The crash ball may also be used when an attacking side is a couple of meters away from the opposition try-line. A player, usually a lock or other forward, will run onto a pass and attempt to run into a defender with enough force to be able to push them back over their line and then be able to ground the ball and score a try.

Size, strength and resilience are the main assets of an effective crash ball runner; passing and handling skills are also important.
