= Spear tackle =

Head-first thrust into the ground

A spear tackle is an illegal tackle in rugby union, rugby league and Australian rules football in which a player lifts another player into the air and drops them so that they land on their back, head or neck. Spear tackles have caused serious injury including spinal damage, dislocations, broken bones in the shoulder or neck, and death. Due to the dangers, players executing a spear tackle in these sports are punished severely.

== Rugby union ==
The term "spear tackle" has been in use since at least 1995. World Rugby (previously called the IRB) has ruled that a dangerous tackle of this type, sometimes also called a 'tip tackle', should be punished with a straight red card. An IRB memorandum on dangerous tackles from 8 June 2009 states: "At a subsequent IRB High Performance Referee Seminar at Lensbury referees were advised that for these types of tackles they were to start at red card as a sanction and work backwards."

The IRB amended the law (Law 10.4(j)), in December 2010. In the previous version of the law, the tackled player's head or shoulders had to hit the ground first for a referee to penalise them. The revised law removes the possibility of a spearing tackle not being penalised if the tackled player breaks their fall with their arms.

== Rugby league ==
The National Rugby League (NRL) competition in Australia awards a penalty for players being lifted beyond the horizontal. A spear tackle where their body is in a vertical position, with their head facing the ground usually results in a send-off. It is often termed a "dangerous throw". Generally, these tackles are also put "on report" meaning that in the coming week the judiciary is forced to review the incident and pursue the matter further if deemed appropriate, although particularly bad examples may be punished by sending the player off, reducing his team to one less player on the field. This term is used throughout the northern and southern hemispheres.

== Australian rules football ==
In the Australian Football League (AFL), it is a reportable offence, and players found guilty face the tribunal and possible suspension with at least a two match ban.

== See also ==
- Dump tackle - similar to a spear tackle
- Grapple tackle - another controversial tackling technique
- High tackle
- Tackle (football move)
- Glossary of rugby league terms
- Glossary of rugby union terms
