= Rugby union gameplay =

Contact sport game

Diagram of a rugby union playing field showing the different marked lines and distances.

Rugby union is a contact sport that consists of two teams of fifteen players. The objective is to obtain more points than the opposition through scoring tries or kicking goals over eighty minutes of playing time. The play is started with one team drop-kicking the ball from the halfway line towards the opposition. The rugby ball can be moved up the field by either carrying it or kicking it. However, when passing the ball it can only be thrown laterally or backward. The opposition can stop players moving up the field by tackling them. Only players carrying the ball can be tackled and once a tackle is completed the opposition can compete for the ball. Play continues until a try is scored, the ball crosses the side line or dead-ball line, or an infringement occurs. After a team scores points, the non-scoring team restarts the game at the halfway with a drop kick toward the opposition. The team with the most points at the end wins the game.

== Typical gameplay ==
A typical passage of rugby union takes the following form. Unlike rugby league and gridiron football, possession of the ball in rugby union is contestable at any time by both teams – there is no separate 'offense' and 'defense'. The team which has possession of the ball at any given time will normally try to keep it, while the other team will try to recapture it, or at least deny the team in possession the chance to attack and/or force it to kick the ball away or commit an error. One team will initially gain possession of the ball, either from the kick-off, a restart kick or a set piece (scrum and line-out). The need to maintain possession means the team with the ball will usually seek to progress towards the opposition by running forward while carrying the ball; although if there are few opportunities to attack they may choose to kick the ball forward, from the hand, usually giving it back to the opposition but in a position from where it will be difficult to attack. The ball may be thrown from one player to another (passing) but must not be thrown forward, that is towards the opposition dead-ball line. Any teammate ahead of the ball-carrier is offside and must not interfere with play. So American football-style blocking is forbidden, although tackling or obstructing a player who does not have the ball is against the laws anyway, whether or not the tackling player is offside. The team not in possession attempts to stop the ball-carrier by grabbing and bringing them to ground (a tackle). A tackled player, once having been brought to ground, must immediately pass or release the ball, allowing the two teams to contest possession of the loose ball; if the attacking player is tackled but the tackler releases the ball carrier the ball carrier may get up and continue the play. Play does not stop unless there is an infringement of the Laws, the ball/ball-carrier leaves the field of play, the ball becomes unplayable after a tackle, or the attacking team scores points by either touching the ball over the goal-line (a try) or drop-kicking the ball over the crossbar. If the ball or ball-carrier goes into touch (out of the field of play), the game restarts with a line-out. If the game stops due to an infringement, play restarts with either a scrum, free kick or penalty kick (depending on the nature of the infringement) to the non-infringing team.

== Running ==
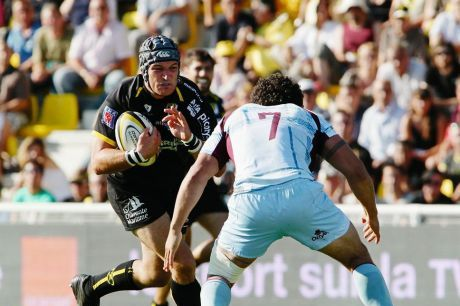
A player running straight at the opposition

Players can run with the ball in any direction they want. However they cannot use a teammate to obstruct the opposition. This occurs when they run around or into one of their own players and in the process prevent a defender from tackling them. Defending teams can also run anywhere they want as long as they do not start from an offside position. Offside lines are behind the last foot at a ruck, maul or tackle or five and ten metres back from scrums and lineouts respectively. If the ball is kicked, players from the kicking team cannot run forward until they have been passed by the kicker or someone behind the kicker.

Forwards tend to run straight and hard at the opposition, while the backs run at gaps between players or use speed and guile to run around them. In modern games of rugby some backs can be as big as forwards and attempt to break through the defensive line using brute force and many forwards possess the running skills of backs. Players run straight at the opposition with the aim of either breaking the tackle or getting forward momentum from which to set up another attack. If they are close to the try line they can drive in low to aid grounding the ball. Players can also try to break through tackles by spinning after making contact or by using the hand not carrying the ball to fend (push) off the defender.

A player could also try to get around a defender by stepping, swerving, or goose-stepping past them. To sidestep a defender, the attacking player takes a wide step in one direction while running forward and then shifts their body weight in the opposite direction. If successful the defender will be off balance, allowing the attacker to accelerate past. When swerving, an attacker runs straight at the defender, but before making contact accelerates and sways to the outside. Although similar to a side step, the swerve involves less sideways movement, but results in less loss of speed. The goose-step is a move made famous by David Campese and involves slowing down while running on the outside of the opponent, causing them to also slow, before accelerating away.

== Passing ==
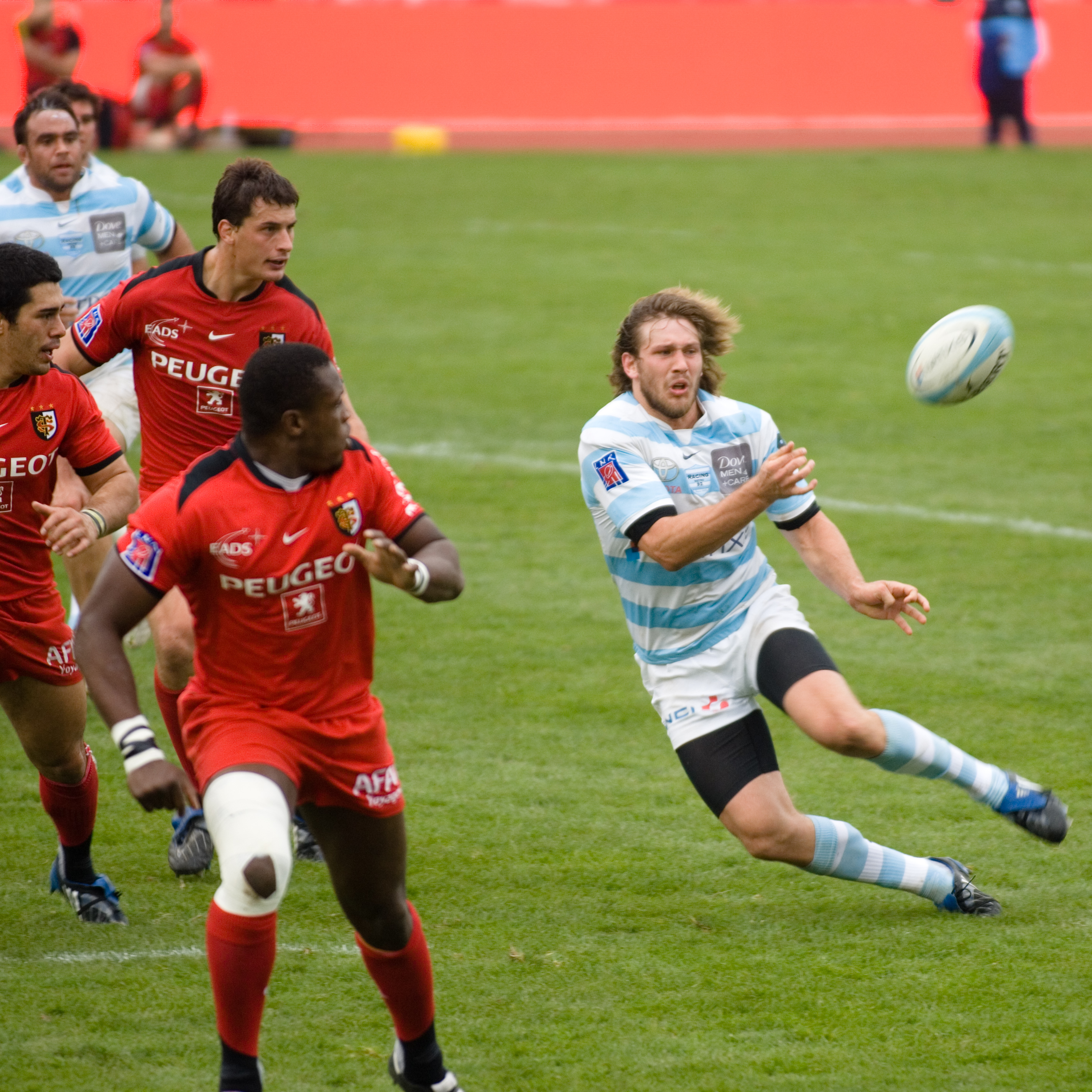
The spiral pass is used to move the ball a great distance

The ball can be passed laterally or backwards, but cannot be thrown forward. The opposing team is awarded a scrum if the ball is unintentionally thrown forward or if it is knocked forward from a player's hand or arm – although doing so deliberately results in a penalty. An exception is if a player knocks the ball forward in attempting to block an opponent's kick – a 'charge down'. Passing is an integral part of rugby union, as it allows the ball to be easily and quickly distributed to teammates. The backs are the major participants of passes, and they are used to put running players into space. If a team has an overlap – more players attacking than the other team has defending at a particular moment – then the tactic is to draw a defending player to the tackle and pass to the person outside him. If every player executes the 'draw and pass', given space, the outside players may have no defenders in front of them.

Another tactic is pretending to pass the ball, called 'dummying'. It can be used during normal backline play or as part of a set move. The aim of the dummy is to confuse the opposition and create a gap for the player carrying the ball. When used as a set move a player will run as a decoy, usually at a different angle to the rest of the players. In complicated moves there will be multiple players acting as decoys. Care must be taken to ensure the decoys do not impede the tacklers, which would result in a penalty being awarded to the defenders.

The standard rugby pass is the spiral pass, where the player swings the ball across his body with the tip point upwards and the ball spinning about its axis. This technique propels the ball quickly and accurately. 'Quick hands' is the rapid movement of the ball between players, and at its best involves catching and passing the ball in one motion. A 'skip-pass' is a basic move where the ball is passed past the closest player to another further away. The 'double-around' is another simple move that involves the passer quickly running around the player to whom he has just passed the ball and then receiving the ball back from him. If successful it can create an overlap. Another common passing move is the 'cut and switch', which is used to change the direction of the play. For a cut the ball carrier runs laterally across the field before passing the ball to a player running back on an angle; the switch is a simple change of direction: a player standing on one side of a scrum, ruck or maul receives the ball and then passes it to someone on the opposite side.

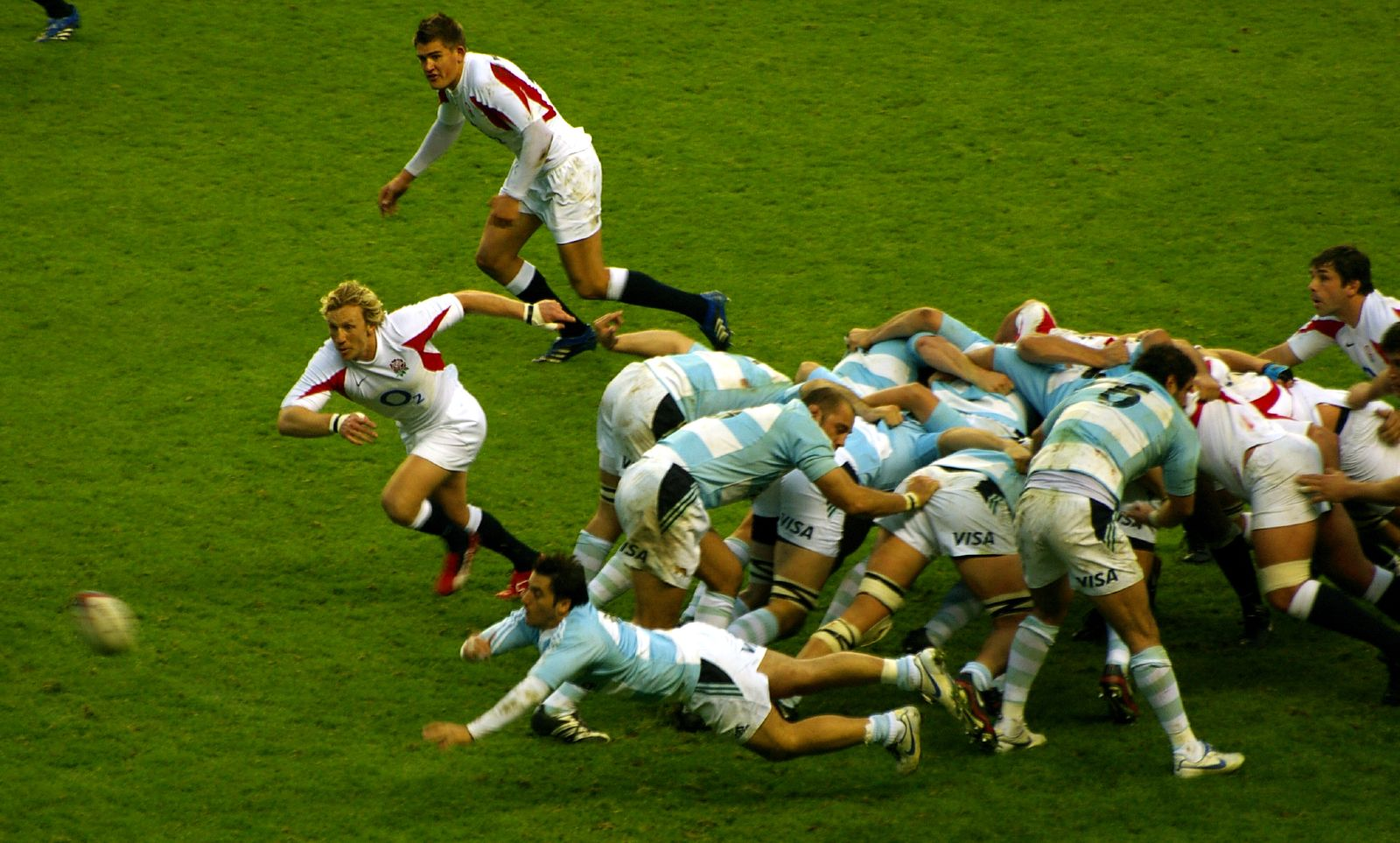
Scrum-half Agustín Pichot dive passing the ball from the back of a scrum.

There are also some specialised passes that can be used during a rugby game. The 'dive-pass' is a pass which is sometimes used by the scrum-half if he is unable to get into the correct position for a long pass. The player dives as he releases the ball, resulting in a quick pass. A 'flick-pass' is similar to a standard pass except the ball is passed with a flick of the wrists, making it a faster pass but with less distance. The 'pop-pass' is a short pass where the ball is simply popped up in a small loop to a player. The 'gut-pass' is a pass straight into the stomach area of a player and is mostly used by the forwards when moving the ball back through a maul.

== Kicking ==
The ball can be kicked in any direction and is used as an attacking option or to gain territory. There are three types of kicks used; the punt, drop kick and place kick. To punt the ball the player must kick the ball before it touches the ground. A drop kick occurs if the ball first bounces on the ground before being kicked. With a place kick the ball must be placed on the ground (usually on a kicking tee or in sand) before being kicked. Slight variations that commonly occur are taps, when a player kicks the ball a very short distance and regathers it, and toe-throughs, when a player kicks the ball along the ground instead of diving on it or picking it up.

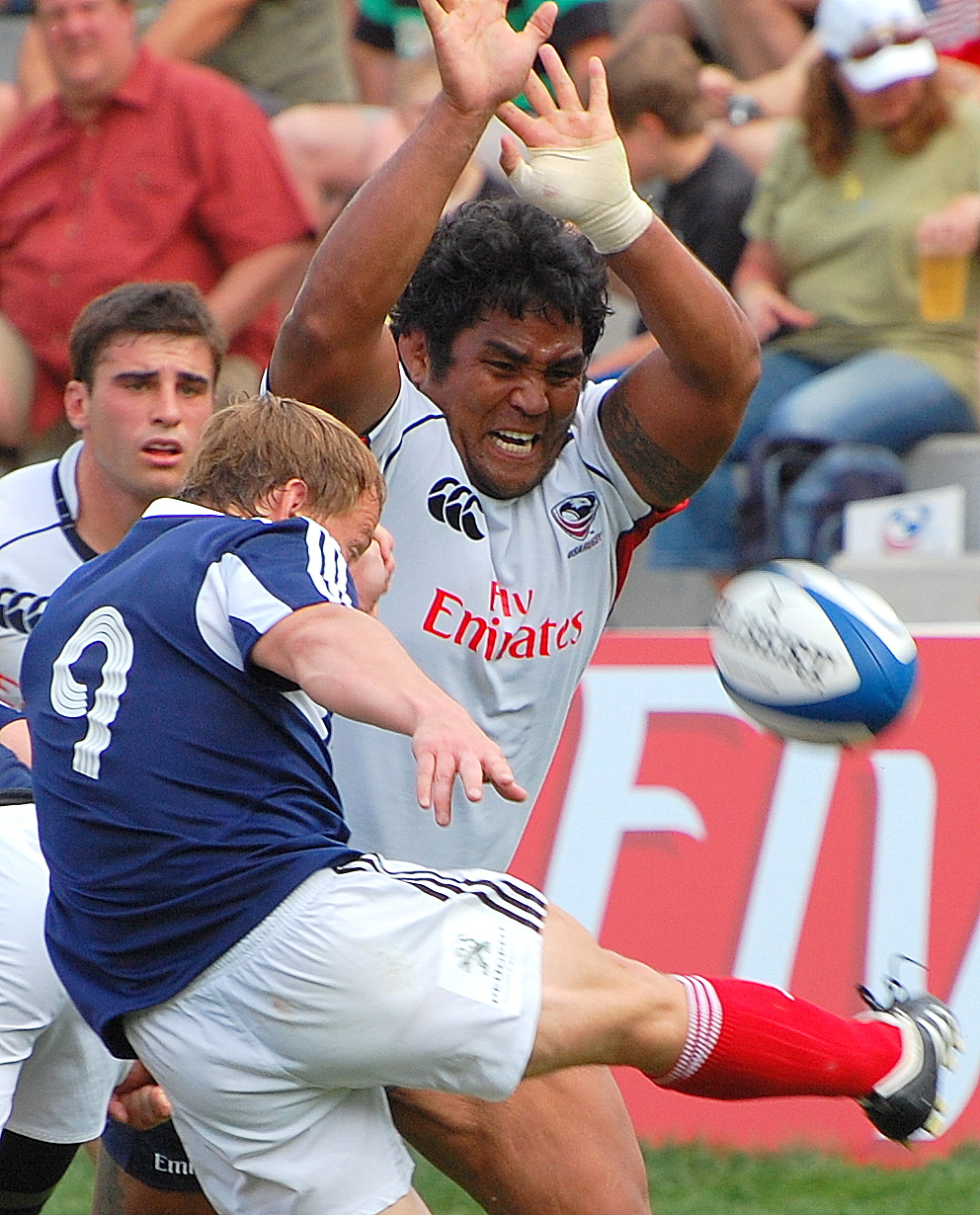
A player attempting to charge down a kick

Punts are the most common type of kick employed by players. They are used as clearing kicks, especially if a team is close to their own goal-line or is looking to gain territory. With these kicks the player tries to kick the ball as far as possible towards the opponents goal and they usually aim for one of the touch lines. If the ball crosses the touch line before being touched by anyone a lineout is awarded to the opposing team. If the ball is put inside the player's 22-metre line by a member of the opposition they can kick the ball out on the full and gain ground. Otherwise ground is only gained if the ball bounces in the field of play before crossing the touch line. Care has to be taken not to kick it too far, because if it travels through their opponents in-goal and becomes dead the opposition is awarded a scrum from where the kick occurred. The disadvantage of "kicking for territory" is that it almost always gives possession of the ball to the opposing team. If a clearing kick is caught by the opposition, then they can counter-attack by running, passing, or kicking the ball back toward the clearing team.

Attacking kicks are also employed, usually if the opposition is out of position or running at them is proving ineffective. Common attacking kicks include the "up and under", box kick, "grubber", crossfield kick and chip kick. The up and under, also known as a "bomb" or Garryowen, is a high punt. A well executed up and under will be high enough to give anyone chasing enough time to compete for the ball. Box kicks are similar, but are kicked by the scrum-half over their shoulder when a ruck, maul, scrum or line-out occurs near the touchline. The ball is kicked high and parallel to the touchline with the wingers chasing. If the ball is kicked along the ground it is called a grubber. It can catch the defenders unaware and because the ball is oval shaped it does not bounce consistently, making it hard for them to collect it. A cross field kick occurs when the ball is kicked from one touchline to a player waiting near the other one. Chip kicks are short kicks just behind the defensive line for attacking players to run onto. Like defensive kicks there is still a risk that the opposition will regain possession after an attacking kick.

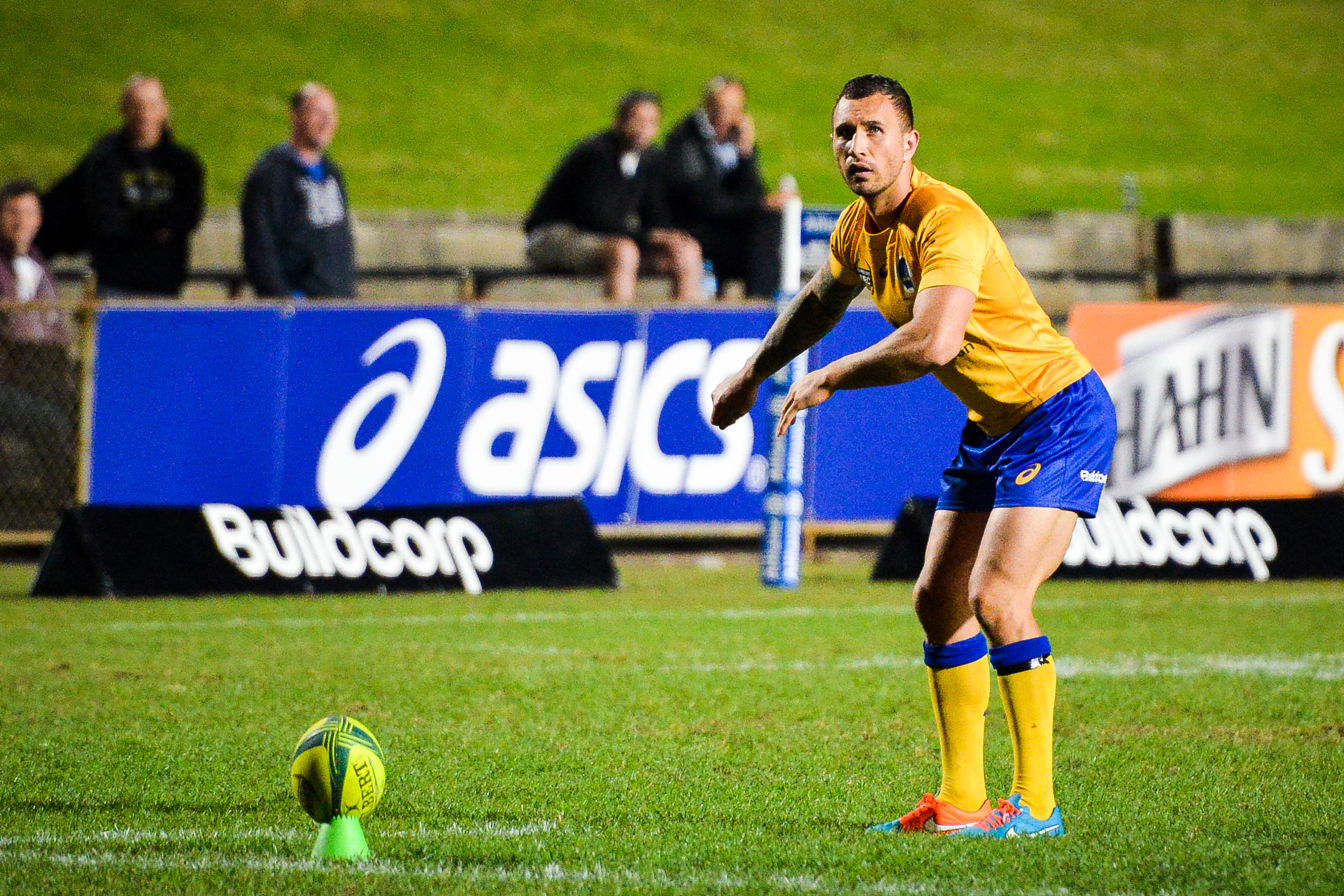
Quade Cooper preparing to take a place kick

Drop kicks are used to start play at the beginning of each half or restart play after points have been scored or the ball is grounded in the in-goal by a defending team. The ball is either kicked long to gain as much territory as possible or short so that the chasers have a chance to regain possession. A shot at goal can also be attempted using a drop goal. This can happen anytime during general play, except after a free kick has been awarded. As a missed drop goal gives possession to the opposition they are generally only attempted in close games to either gain the lead or to push the score beyond a converted try.

Place kicks are only ever used for attempting shots at goal after a penalty has been awarded or when converting a try. Generally one player in the team is the designated goal kicker, although some teams use a stronger, but less accurate, kicker for long shots. In close games the difference between winning or losing can come down to the accuracy of the goal kicker, making them a vital part of any team. The difficulty of a kick at goal increases with distance and angle to the goal posts, with kicks from near the sideline especially difficult. A conversion is taken back in line from the spot where the try was scored, so if possible a scorer will aim to down the ball as close to the goal posts as possible.

Kicking the ball is generally considered the sole preserve of the backs. Exceptions include flanker John Taylor, lock John Eales and number eight Zinzan Brooke, who have all scored points from kicks.

== Breakdowns ==
The aim of the defending side is to stop the player with the ball, either by bringing them to ground (a tackle, which is frequently followed by a ruck), or by contesting for possession with the ball-carrier on their feet (a maul). Such a circumstance is called a breakdown and each is governed by a specific law.

=== Tackle ===
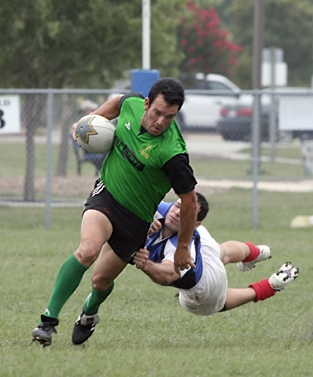
A player attempts a tackle

A player may tackle an opposing player who has the ball by bringing them to ground. Once tackled, a player must immediately release the ball, either by passing to a teammate or placing it on the ground, and the tackler must release them and move away. After the ball has been released by a tackled player, players from either side may try to take possession of the ball. Tacklers cannot tackle above the sternum (the neck and head are out of bounds), and the tackler has to attempt to wrap their arms around the player being tackled to complete the tackle. It is illegal to push, shoulder-charge, or to trip a player using feet or legs, but hands may be used (this being referred to as a tap-tackle or ankle-tap). Tackles that involve lifting a player and then forcing or dropping them to the ground head first (called a tip tackle or spear tackle) have been deemed particularly dangerous. A player performing this sort of tackle would typically be sent-off.

Tackling is the only way to stop a player from running and is a major part of any team's defence. A good tackle stops the player from moving forward and prevents them from passing the ball. It can also put an opponent under pressure and force the ball loose. There are five styles of tackles commonly used by players: the side, rear, passive front, active front and smother. The aim of the active front tackle is to drive the opponent backwards, while the smother tackle prevents the opposing player passing the ball. Once the player has been brought to ground, the tackler typically tries to get to their feet quickly and compete for the ball. Other players arriving at the tackle will also compete for the ball.

The main objective of the player being tackled is to keep possession of the ball. They will try to keep on their feet until teammates arrive in support. If brought to ground, they can immediately pass the ball (offload) or place it on the ground in a position advantageous to their team. The supporting teammates can continue running the ball or form a ruck or maul.

=== Ruck ===
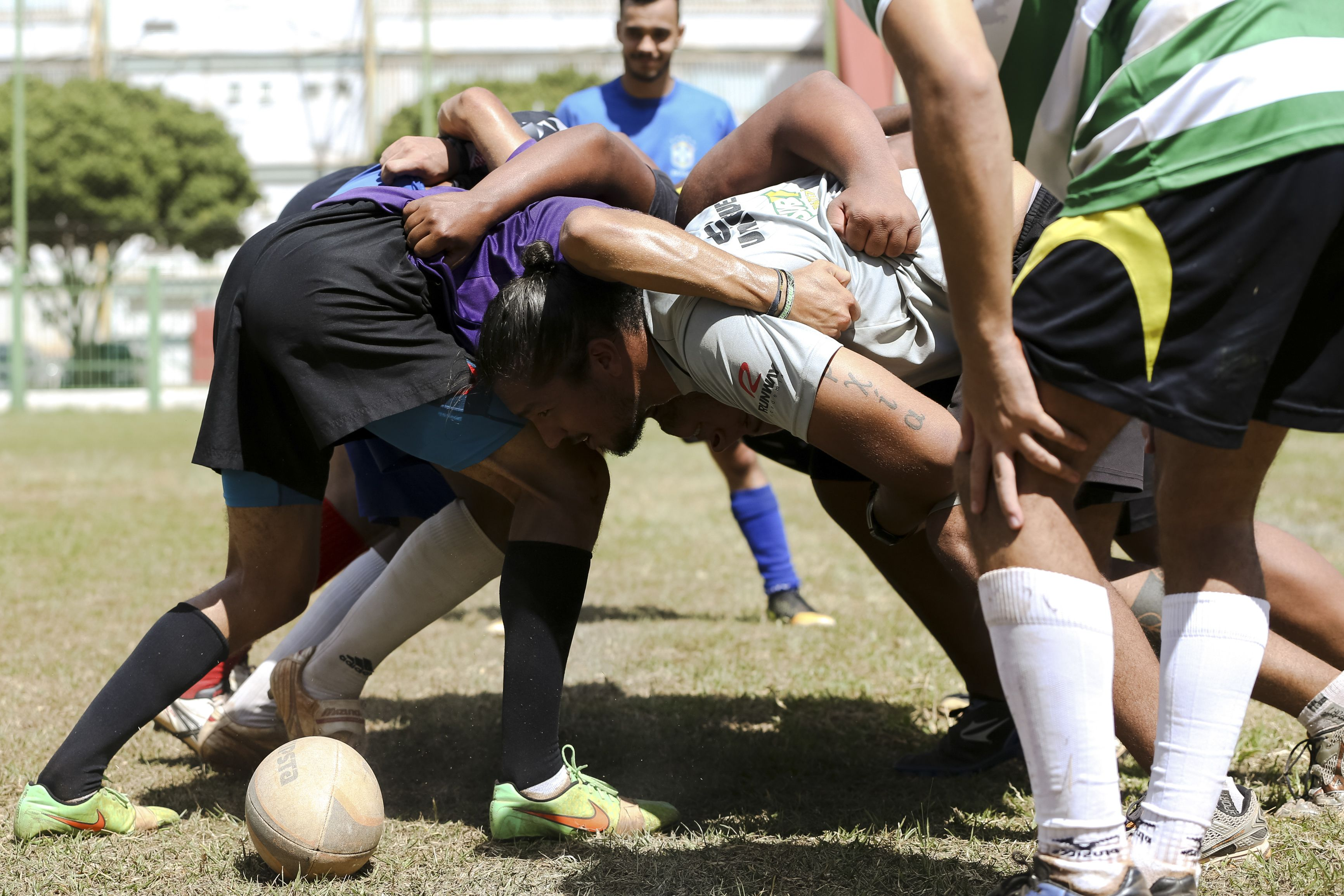
A ruck

A ruck is formed when one or more players from each side bind onto each other with the ball on the ground between them. A ruck often ensues following a tackle. This physical contact, or binding, is generally by locking shoulders while facing each other. Additional players may join the ruck, but must do so from behind the rearmost foot of the hindmost teammate in the ruck; this is often referred to as "coming through the gate". If players do not go "through the gate", it is a penalty to the opposition (“joining from the side” or “in at the side”). Any player not taking part in the ruck and maul must retreat behind the offside line, a notional line that runs parallel to the goal-lines through the rearmost foot of their hindmost teammate in the ruck or maul.

In a ruck, no player may use their hands to win the ball. Instead, each side attempts to push the other side off the ball or use their feet to hook it back towards their own side, an action known as rucking.

Players attempt to arrive at the ruck first, drive forward and bind onto the opposition. Once a ruck is formed the defenders cannot use their hands, making it easier for the attacking team to retain possession. The defenders try to slow the ball from coming out of the ruck, which allows their team more time to organise their defence. This may not be done by using their hands, or lying over the ball, or going to ground deliberately. Such infringements result in penalties if seen by the referee, although the number of bodies involved in the ruck can make this difficult. A legal method used to slow the ball down is counter-rucking, when the defenders drive players back over the ball. If this is done well, the defenders can gain possession of the ball. This is called a turnover.

A drive around a ruck or a scrum is usually performed by the forwards and is intended to break the defensive line using weight and force. The ball-carrier runs directly at the opponents and will endeavour to protect the ball so as to retain possession when contact occurs. This play, often referred to as a "pick-up-and-drive", usually offers a slow but sure advance. Sometimes the tactical aim is to suck defenders into a ruck or maul, opening gaps in the defensive line for the backs to exploit. It is also often employed in the closing minutes of the game by the team that has the lead, because it is an effective way of retaining possession and running down the clock.

The ball emerges from a maul more slowly than from a ruck.

World Rugby announced in 2017 that it would add a major change to the laws governing the ruck among an ongoing series of global law trials. Under this trial law amendment, a ruck is formed "when at least one player is on their feet and over the ball which is on the ground." At this moment, the offside lines are set. A player on his or her feet (typically the tackler) can use hands to pick up the ball if the action is immediate, but once an opposing player arrives at the ruck, no hands can be used. Additionally, kicking the ball out of a ruck is explicitly penalised, with only hooking "in a backwards motion" allowed. The trial was used for several international competitions in 2017, among them the World Under 20 Championship, before taking effect in the Northern Hemisphere on 1 August 2017 and in the Southern Hemisphere from 1 January 2018. All of these amendments were approved unanimously by the World Rugby Council and added to the laws of the game in 2018.

=== Maul ===
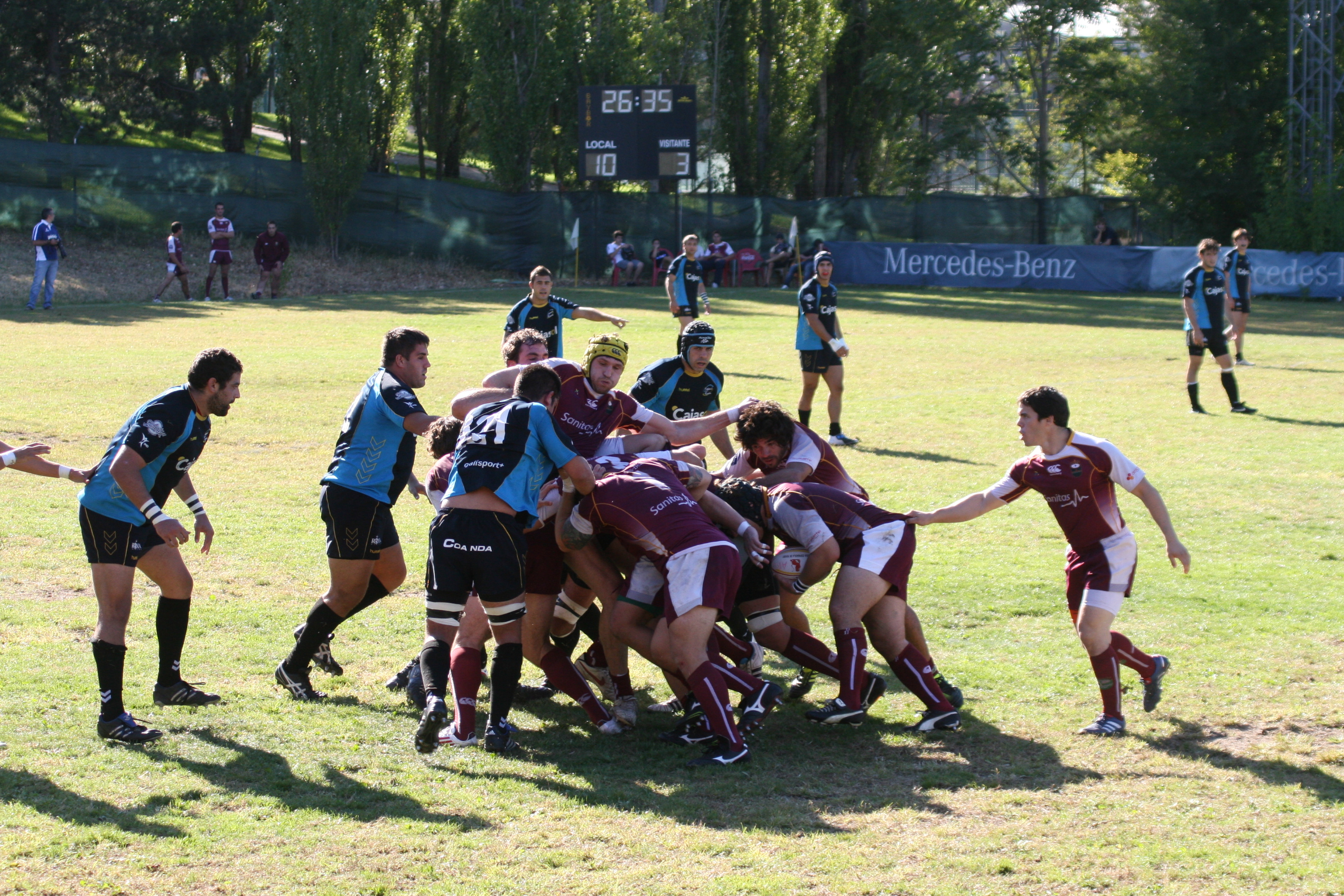
A maul being formed

A maul occurs when a player carrying the ball is held by one or more opponents, and one or more of the ball carrier's teammates bind on the ball carrier. Once a maul has formed other players may join in but, as in a ruck, they must do so from their own side by going through the middle or through the top as long as the maul is stationary. If the maul stops moving forward, and the ball is not available to be played, then the referee awards a scrum to the side not in possession when the maul began (unless the maul was formed immediately after a player received a kick other than a kick-off). The tactic of the rolling maul occurs when mauls are set up, and the ball is passed backwards through the players' hands to one at the rear, who rolls off the side to change the direction of the drive. This tactic can be extremely effective in gaining ground and both doing it properly and preventing it takes great skill and technique. It is a tactic most commonly used when the attacking side is inside the defending side's 22 meter line.

It was once illegal on safety grounds to pull down a maul, causing the players to fall to the ground. With the introduction of the Experimental Law Variations it was permitted to pull down a maul if the forward momentum of the attacking side had been neutralised or reversed, subject to maintaining safety. This decision was reversed to make the pulling down of a maul illegal once more.

On the other hand, a maul is not properly formed if the ball carrier binds on to a teammate from the rear, and both of them then drive into one or more opponents – or if the ball-carrier breaks off from the back of the maul, which continues to drive forward. The players in front are either accidentally or deliberately offside and the referee awards either a scrum or a penalty to the opposing side, depending on whether the infringement was viewed as accidental or deliberate.

The tactic is sometimes referred to by players, commentators, and referees by the colloquial term "truck and trailer".

== Restart kicks ==
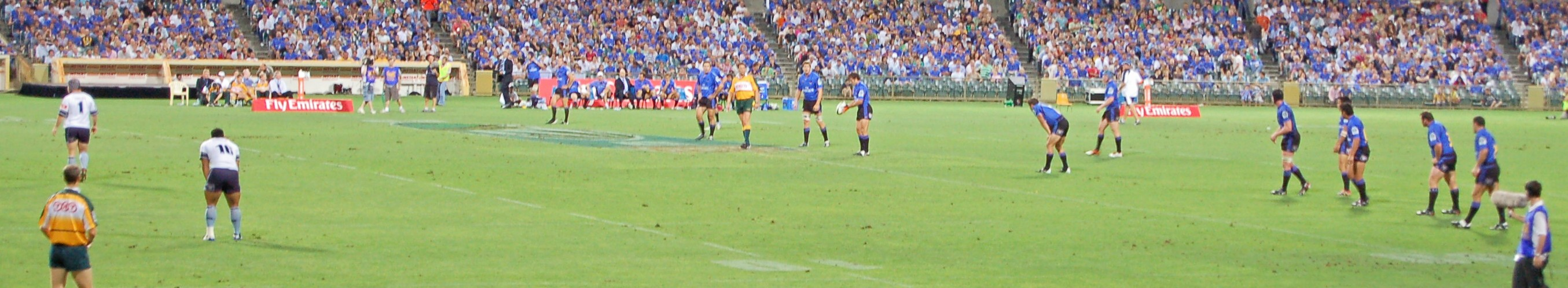
The Western Force from Western Australia (blue team) restarts against the Waratahs from New South Wales (white team) in the Super Rugby competition.

Play is started at the beginning of each half by a kick-off. One side—determined following the toss of a coin—takes a drop kick from the middle of the halfway line to start the half. The ball must travel at least 10 m into the opposition half. None of the kicking team's players are allowed in front of the player taking the kick until after that player's foot has touched the ball. The kicking side frequently kicks the ball high and for it to go just over 10 m, which is marked by a dashed line across the pitch. This tactic gives their players time to chase the lobbed ball and hope to catch it before the opposition does. Alternatively the kick may be a long kick deep into opposition territory, sacrificing the chance to regain possession for territorial gain. A restart kick that does not cross the 10 m line can either be played by the receiving team, but not by the kicking team, or a midfield scrum is awarded to the receiving team. A restart kick that crosses the side lines without being touched awards the receiving team either a midfield scrum or a line out on the halfway line, receiving team option.

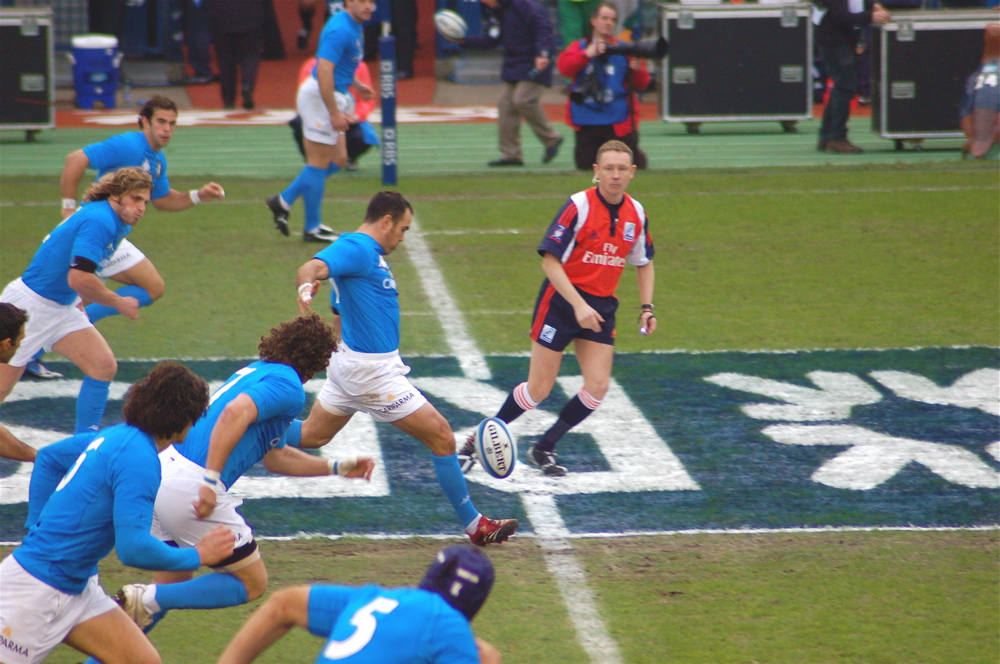
Italy kicks off against Scotland in the Six Nations Championship. Note the Italian players are behind their kicker.

Similarly, there is also a 22 m drop-out. This is awarded if the attacking side is responsible for sending the ball into the in-goal area, but instead of their player grounding the ball and scoring a try it is first grounded by a defender. If the ball is kicked into the in-goal area by the attackers and instead of being grounded there by either side it continues, under its own momentum, through the in-goal area and crosses the dead-ball line, then the defenders have the option of choosing either a 22 m drop out or a scrum at the place where the attackers kicked the ball. The 22 m drop out is taken at any point along (or behind) the 22 m line.

== Penalty kicks and free kicks ==
Penalty kicks are awarded for dangerous play. A penalty kick may either be used to attempt a penalty goal, kick into touch (either directly or indirectly, in both cases the kicking team throws-in the ball at the ensuing line-out) or tapped with the foot (giving the kicking player possession of the ball). In each case, the opponents must retire to a distance 10 m from the point at which the penalty is awarded.

A free kick is awarded for technical infringements that do not warrant a penalty. A free kick differs from a penalty in that it cannot be used for an attempt at goal. If the ball goes into touch, the kicking team does not receive the throw at the ensuing lineout. When kicked directly into touch (i.e. without bouncing) there is no gain in ground from the free kick unless it was taken from behind the kicking team's 22-metre line.

A free kick is also awarded when a player catches an opponent's kick on or behind his own 22 m line and shouts the word "mark".

== Scrum ==
A scrum showing the body positions of the forwards, as well as the position of both scrum-halves and the referee.

A scrum is a way of restarting the game safely and fairly after a minor infringement. It is awarded when the ball has been knocked or passed forward, when a player is accidentally offside, or when the ball is trapped in a ruck or maul with no realistic chance of being retrieved. A team may also opt for a scrum if awarded a penalty. It is also awarded to the passing or kicking team if the ball hits the referee.

A scrum is formed by the eight forwards from each team binding together in three rows. The front row consists of the two props (loosehead and tighthead) either side of the hooker. The second row consists of two locks and the two flankers. Behind the second row is the number 8. This formation is known as the 3–4–1 formation. The two packs of forwards engage with each other so that the heads of the front-rowers are interlocked with those of their opponents. Front-rowers always aim for the gap to the left (as they see it) of their opponent. The two locks in the second row bind directly behind the front row with their heads between a prop and the hooker. The flankers bind either side of the locks, and the number 8 binds behind and between the two locks.

Once a scrum is formed the scrum-half from the team awarded the feed throws the ball into the gap between the two front-rows known as the tunnel. The two hookers then compete for possession by hooking the ball backwards with their feet, while each pack tries to push the opposing pack backwards to help gain possession. The side that wins possession transfers the ball to the back of the scrum, where it is picked up either by the number 8 or by the scrum-half. Either the scrum half or the number 8 can then pass, run, or kick the ball and normal play then resumes. A scrum has to be awarded between the 5 metres (16 ft) lines along the goal-lines and touch-lines. A team may also score a pushover try from a scrum; once the ball has crossed the goal-line during a scrum an attacking player may legally ground it.

Scrums are one of the most dangerous phases in rugby, since a collapse or improper engage can lead to a front row player damaging or even breaking his neck. For this reason, only trained players may play in the front row to help avoid injuries. If a team is without sufficient specialist front row players, for example because of injury or sin-binning, all scrums may be "uncontested scrums". In this situation, the packs engage, but do not push, and the team that still puts the ball into the scrum must win it without effort.

== Line-out ==
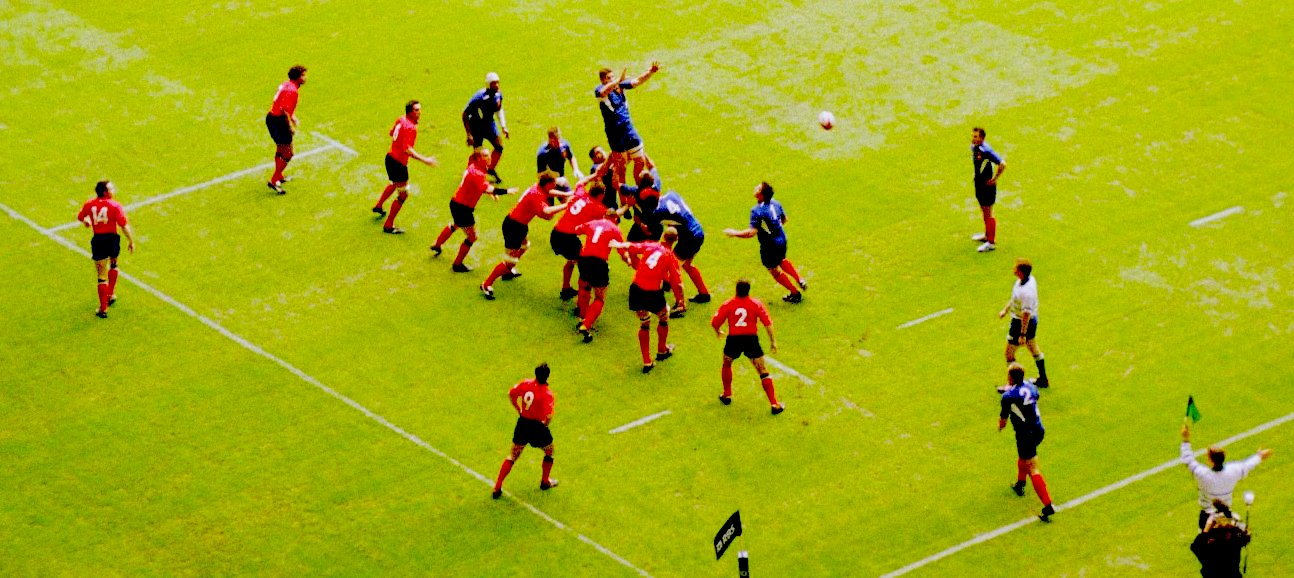
A lineout, just after the ball has been thrown in.

When the ball goes into touch (i.e. outside of the area of play) the referee calls a line-out at the point where the ball crossed the touchline. There are two exceptions for this rule:

1. No line-out is awarded closer than 5 m to opponent team goal line, if the ball crosses the touch closer the throw-in occurs on 5 m line.
2. If a kick goes directly into touch and the kicker is outside his own 22 m line the throw-in occurs where the ball was kicked from.

The forwards of each team (though not necessarily all of them, their number is throwing-in team option) line up a metre apart, perpendicular to the touchline and between 5 m and 15 m from the touchline. The ball is thrown from the touchline down the centre of the lines of forwards by a player (usually the hooker) from the team that did not play the ball into touch. The exception to this is when the ball went out from a penalty, in which case the side who gained the penalty throws the ball in. There is an advantage to being the team throwing the ball as that team then knows where along the line the throw is aimed. If the ball passes over the 15 m line, it can be played by everyone and the line-out is over; if the ball is not thrown straight down the middle of the line-out, the non-infringing team may choose to have the put-in to either a new line-out or a scrum 15 m infield.

Both sides compete for the ball, and some players may lift their teammates. (While the laws say that jumping players may only be supported, lifting is uniformly tolerated under specified conditions). A jumping player cannot be tackled until they stand and only shoulder-to-shoulder contact is allowed; deliberate infringement of this Law is dangerous play, and results in a penalty kick, and frequently a trip to the sin bin. If a penalty kick is awarded during a line-out and the line out is not over, it is taken 15 m from the touch line.

== See also ==
- Comparison of American football and rugby union
- Comparison of rugby league and rugby union
- Rugby sevens
- Tag rugby
- Touch rugby
- Rugby league gameplay

== Bibliography ==
- Johnson, Howard (2008). Rugby Union Manual. Haynes Publishing. ISBN 9781844255030.
- "Laws of the Game Rugby Union" (PDF). World Rugby. 5 January 2020.
- "Provisions Relating to Players Dress". World Rugby. 5 January 2020.
