= Experimental law variations =

The experimental law variations (ELVs) were a proposed set of amendments to the laws of rugby union. They were proposed by the sport's governing body, the International Rugby Board (IRB), and trialled games at Stellenbosch University in 2006. In 2008 thirteen of the 23 variations trialled were played globally including; greater responsibility for assistant referees, corner posts no longer considered to touch in-goal, no gain in ground if the ball is moved into the 22-metre line by a player from the same team as the kicker, quick throw ins can travel backwards, no restrictions to players in the lineout, restrictions on where receivers and opposition hookers can stand in a lineout, pregripping and lifting allowed, mauls can be pulled down and players can enter with their head and shoulders lower than their hips, offside line is five metres away from the scrum for the backs and scrum half must be positioned close to the scrum, all offences apart from foul play and offsides are a free kick, and unplayable rucks and mauls are restarted with a free kick. In 2009 the IRB approved ten of the laws, rejecting the laws relating to mauls, numbers in a lineout and the increase in sanctions punishable by free kicks.

== The need for law amendments ==
Before the law amendments the Laws of Rugby Union book from the International Rugby Board stretched to 190 pages, much of them covering the contest for possession and continuity of play, which are key features of the union code and are developed more extensively than in other forms of football. The contest for possession in or after a tackle is complex and so are the laws governing it. Rugby League and American Football overcome this by abolishing any contest — play stops after a successful tackle and there is no subsequent contest for possession until the next play. In rugby union the ongoing contest for the ball at the "breakdown" is one of the most important and integral aspects of the game, something that makes it unique in the world of football.

The problems observed with the previous laws mostly revolve around one fact; that in practice the contest for the ball was often halted through law infringements. Different referees used different interpretations of the complex laws, and many games are decided by penalty goals awarded by referees for infringements that were not immediately obvious to observers or even the players.

The Stellenbosch ELVs were based on proposals made in the mid 2000s, and came to wider prominence following the 2007 Rugby World Cup. Outgoing IRB president Syd Millar explained that in his opinion amendments were needed because delays in the release of the ball from the contest for possession were having adverse effects. In his view, the domination of defence over attack was slowing the continuity of play, exemplified by what some viewers considered a dour final match in which no tries were scored.

Millar said that the game needed to be sped up a bit, to make it easier to play, easier to referee, easier to understand and to produce more options for the players. The amendments concentrate on rucks and mauls, but include other aspects which help keep the ball in play and reduce stoppages for infringements and penalties.

== Panel ==
The Experimental Law Variations (ELV's) were devised on behalf of the IRB by The Laws Project Group (LPG), which was set up by the IRB's Rugby Committee in 2006 and comprises: Chairman and IRB Council member Bill Nolan; IRB Development Manager Bruce Cook; former World Cup winning Wallaby coach Rod Macqueen; former Springbok coach Ian McIntosh; former Scottish coach Richie Dixon; former French player, coach and former IRB Regional Development Manager Pierre Villepreux; former All Black captain and Wellington coach Graham Mourie and the IRB Referee Manager Paddy O'Brien.. The Laws Project Group was dissolved in April 2009 after selected ELV's were incorporated into the Laws of Rugby.

== Laws ==
The proposed law amendments were:

- In the original version of the laws, players were allowed to use their hands at all times at the breakdown. A slightly different rule, prohibiting hands in the ruck but making it only a free kick, has been trialled as well. The final rule regarding hands in the ruck has not been established. In any event, players must come into the breakdown in an onside position, and only players who are on their feet are allowed to play the ball. The side that takes the ball into the breakdown loses it if they do not recycle possession.
- At the scrum, all backs except for the two scrum-halves must be at least 5 metres behind the hindmost foot of the scrum, instead of level with it as allowed in the previous laws.
- Either side can use as many players as they like in the line-out, at any time, providing they fit between the 5-metre line and the 15-metre line.
- The opposing hooker in a lineout no longer has to stand between the 5-metre line and touchline; he can stand anywhere he wishes as long as he conforms to the laws.
- On a quick throw in the ball can be thrown straight or back towards the defenders' goal line, but not forwards towards the opposition goal line.
- Where touch judges are trained referees, they will be referred to as assistant referees, with responsibility for policing the offside lines.
- Penalty kicks are generally to be given only for offside and foul play. Most other penalties will become free kicks, with the option of taking a scrum as in the current laws, which cannot be used for a kick at goal or a dropped goal.
- If the ball is passed or run back into the 22 and then kicked out on the full before a tackle, ruck or maul is effected, the resulting lineout is taken from where the kick was made. However, if the kick bounces into touch, the lineout is taken from where the ball went into touch, as in the previous laws.
- The maul can be collapsed by defending sides without incurring a penalty if the forward momentum of the attacking side has been neutralized or reversed.
- The corner flag, currently situated where the try line meets the touchline, will become part of the field of play. Under the current laws, a try is still allowed if a player touches the corner flag while attempting to touch the ball down.

== Trials ==
After the initial trials at Stellenbosch University, the laws were enacted in the following competitions;

- Scotland's Super Cup tournament for Premiership teams from January 2007
- Cambridge University in the first division of their inter-college league
- England's County Championship
- The Shute Shield and NSW Suburban Rugby club competitions in Sydney.
- Brisbane club competitions
- The defunct Australian Rugby Championship
- The international provincial Super 14 competition in 2008.

The South African, New Zealand and Australian rugby unions requested that the laws be introduced to the Tri Nations in 2008 as well but Syd Millar has said the results in the Super 14, which is "near enough international level", need to be studied before use in matches between nations can be sanctioned.

=== Global Trial ===
On 1 May 2008 the IRB announced that its Council had approved a global trial of Experimental Law Variations (ELVs) for a period of 12 months, starting on 1 August 2008. The trial, which applied at all levels of the Game, involved 13 of the 23 ELVs that had been undergoing experimentation in approved tournaments around the world in the preceding two years. Most of the variations were the same as those trialled in the 2008 Super 14 and 2008 Tri Nations competitions. The significant differences were that the global trial did not include the experimental law which substitutes a free kick instead of a penalty for many offences, but did include the experimental laws relating to numbers in the lineout and collapsing the maul.

=== Feedback from trials ===
Use of the ELVs in the 2007 Australian Rugby Championship was deemed an overall success. The Australian Broadcasting Corporation which broadcasts most of the games said general reactions by coaches, players, and fans was overwhelmingly positive, with these specific details reported:

- The ball spent more time in play, producing a faster game.
- Fewer penalties (kicks at goal) were given.
- More free kicks were awarded, but were usually run instantly, producing quick play-ons.
- "Some uncertainty lingers" over the rule allowing the maul to be pulled down, as it "negates to an extent a quintessential element of the game".
- Fewer kicks were made into touch on the full from inside the 22.
- The short kicking game (with the ball not going into touch) was employed more extensively than usual.
- Forwards and backs line up against each other more often, blurring the lines of traditional positional play.

== Criticisms ==
The need for rule changes to satisfy those who prefer a certain type of open rugby is under question, given that the Rugby World Cup 2007 broke all viewing figures for the sport. The semi-finals and final were the most watched rugby matches on record, indicating that many viewers are attracted to the nature and tension of the game as played under current laws. The dour games some saw could also be interpreted as a nail biting, passionate contest with both sides engaging in courageous, hard-hitting defence.

The resistance to the rule changes are based on a desire to ensure the contest for the ball is not replaced by a purely attacking, scoring free-for-all where defence is hampered and scorelines multiply. Increased player numbers and increasing spectators in the Northern Hemisphere, along with a more flowing style of play adopted at club level, is held as evidence that the law changes are not required.

There was a criticism that the changes would benefit teams with weaker scrums and ineffective set piece play, but this has been rebuffed somewhat with the application of the experimental laws by leagues in the Southern Hemisphere. It has been revealed that a strong scrum is still strong no matter whether it is set once or many times and can still be used as an attacking weapon.

Bryan Habana was the first high-profile player to criticise the laws, stating that they were turning the game into rugby league by eliminating most of the breaks in play. There has also been criticism from many coaches, players and fans in the northern hemisphere. Sean Fitzpatrick, (former All Black hooker and most capped All Black of all time), Shaun Edwards (coach London Wasps/Wales), Warren Gatland (former All Black and coach Wales), Jason Leonard (most capped prop in history), Martin Johnson (2003 World Cup Winning captain and ex-England Coach), Brian Moore, Paul Ackford and Josh Kronfeld (All Black), amongst others have and continue to raise concerns that the Stellenbosch Laws will be to the detriment of the game. The reduction of breaks in the game, faster paced play and the tendency to mix backs and forwards requires the players to be fitter and more athletic. This may produce the desired effect for television viewers watching the elite players, but the requirements may make rugby virtually unplayable for participants at the amateur level, undermining a fundamental claim of Rugby Union, that it is a game for "all shapes and all sizes". The law allowing collapsing of a maul has become a major worry at community level because of the dangers it may cause inexperienced players.

Irish Coach Declan Kidney has observed that disallowing mauls at the breakdown means defences stay spread out, meaning less space for attackers, making it more difficult for an attacking side to advance, resulting in more kicking. In this case the ELVs, rather than encouraging attacking play have produced the opposite effect.

== Implementation ==
The following ELVs were implemented into Law in 2009:

- At the scrum, all backs except for the two scrum-halves must be at least 5 metres behind the hindmost foot of the scrum.
- On a quick throw in the ball can be thrown straight or back towards the defenders' goal line, but not forwards towards the opposition goal line.
- Where touch judges are trained referees, they are now referred to as assistant referees, with responsibility for policing the offside lines.
- If the ball is passed or run back into the 22 and then kicked out on the full before a tackle, ruck or maul is effected, the resulting lineout is taken from where the kick was made. However, if the kick bounces into touch, the lineout is taken from where the ball went into touch.
- The corner flag, currently situated where the try line meets the touchline, is now part of the field of play. Under the previous laws, a try was disallowed if a player touched the corner flag before touching the ball down.
