= Laws of rugby union =

Rules for the international sport

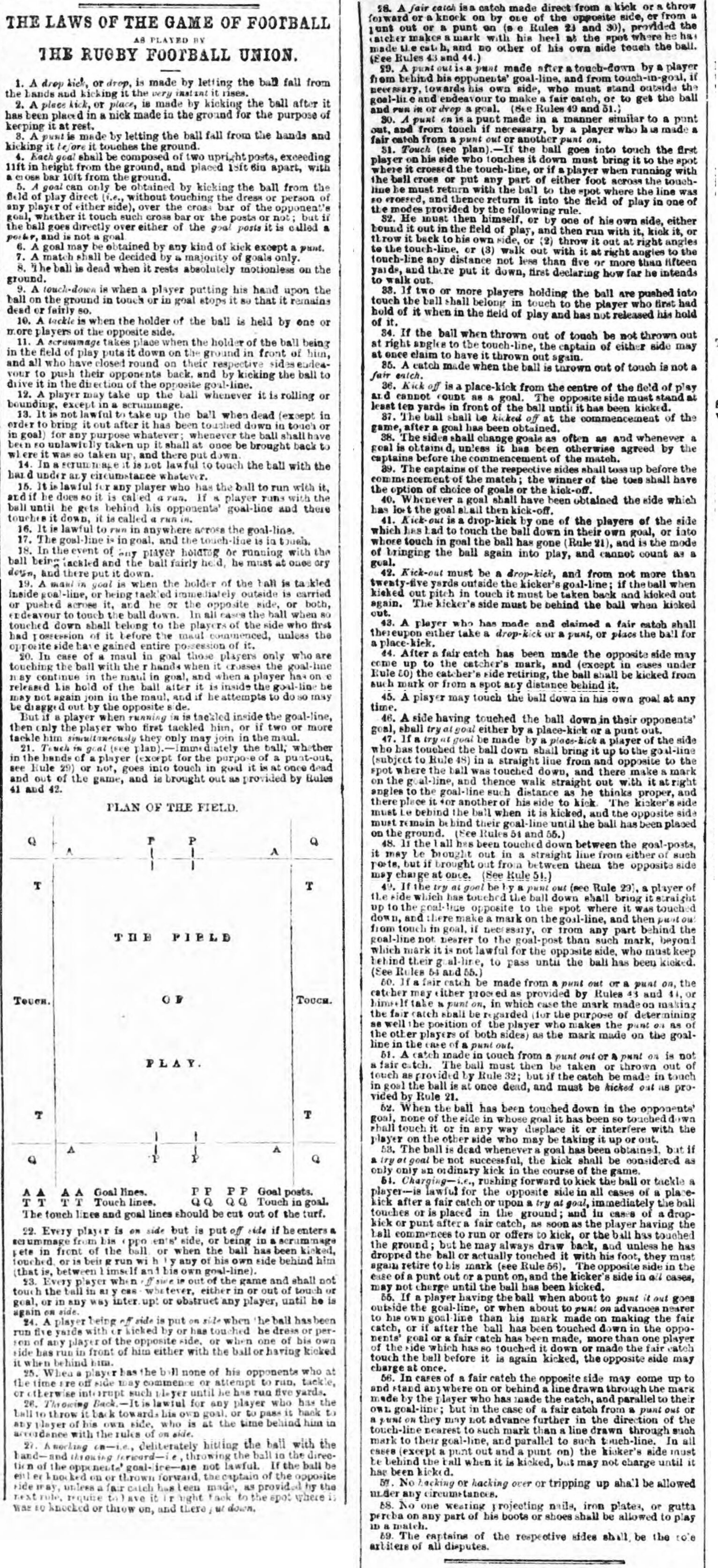
The "Laws of Football" by the Rugby Football Union, as they were published in a newspaper in 1871

The laws of Rugby Union are defined by World Rugby (originally the International Rugby Football Board, and later International Rugby Board) and dictate how the game should be played. They are enforced by a referee, generally with the help of two assistant referees.

When playing a game of Rugby Union the overall objective is to score more points than the opposition through tries and goals. A try worth five points is scored when a team grounds the ball in the opposition's in-goal. A conversion (kick at a goal) is then attempted by either place- or drop-kicking the ball between the H-shaped goal posts and above the crossbar. If successful this is worth two extra points.

Penalties are awarded for major infringements such as offside or foul play and the team that is awarded them can choose to take a shot at goal in an attempt to score three points. They can also use the penalty to kick for territory or tap the ball and continue running it. Three points are awarded if a team member drop kicks a goal during general play.

The game of Rugby evolved at Rugby School from early folk football, with the rules of play being agreed upon before the start of each match. Some Rugby clubs were also early members of The Football Association, leaving after they left out rules for "running with the ball" and "hacking" when framing their code in 1863. The rugby laws were standardised in 1870 and the International Rugby Football Board (now World Rugby) was formed in 1886. In 1930 the IRFB was made responsible for developing any new laws. These laws have changed over time. The point value for scoring tries has increased from zero to five, penalties were initially worth just two points and drop goals four. The ball has changed too, going from a pig's bladder to a rubber bladder in first a leather and nowadays, a plastic case, and becoming more oval in shape. Player numbers were initially 20 each side, but reduced to 15 in 1877. The laws are always being tweaked in the early twenty-first century, with some of the biggest changes being introduced in 2009.

The game is usually played on a grass field approximately 70 metres (230 ft) by 100 metres (330 ft). At each end of the field are the goal posts and an in-goal area. Games last for eighty minutes and are divided into two forty-minute halves. Each team defends one end and attempts to score points through tries and goals. One team kicks the ball towards the opposition starting play. At half time they swap ends, with the other team kicking off. After a successful kick-off the ball is in general play and can be passed, kicked, caught, picked up or grounded by any player. The ball can be kicked in any direction, but may only be passed backwards. Players attempt to stop the opposition running the ball by tackling them. Rucks form when at least one player from each team is on their feet and the ball is on the ground. Mauls are formed when the ball carrier is held by at least one of the opposition and a teammate is also bound to them. Players can compete for the ball at tackles, rucks and mauls in accordance with the laws.

Scrums are used to start play after minor infringements (knock-ons and forward passes) and when the ball becomes unplayable. All eight members of the forwards must be involved in the scrum provided the team still has all fifteen players present. Players involved in the scrum stay bound to each other and the opposition until it is finished and the rest, except the scrum-half, must be positioned at least five metres back. The two teams push against each other and the hookers strike for the ball once the scrum half puts the ball into the "tunnel" (gap between the two front rows). The scrum half must put the ball straight down the centre of the tunnel, if the scrum half deliberately puts the ball in at an angle to his second rows feet, (feeding the ball), the opposition are awarded the 'put in'.

Lineouts are used to restart play when the ball has crossed the sidelines. Players form two parallel lines perpendicular to the sideline and the team that did not put the ball out throws it straight down the middle. Players in the line-out can be lifted by teammates as they attempt to win the ball.

== History ==
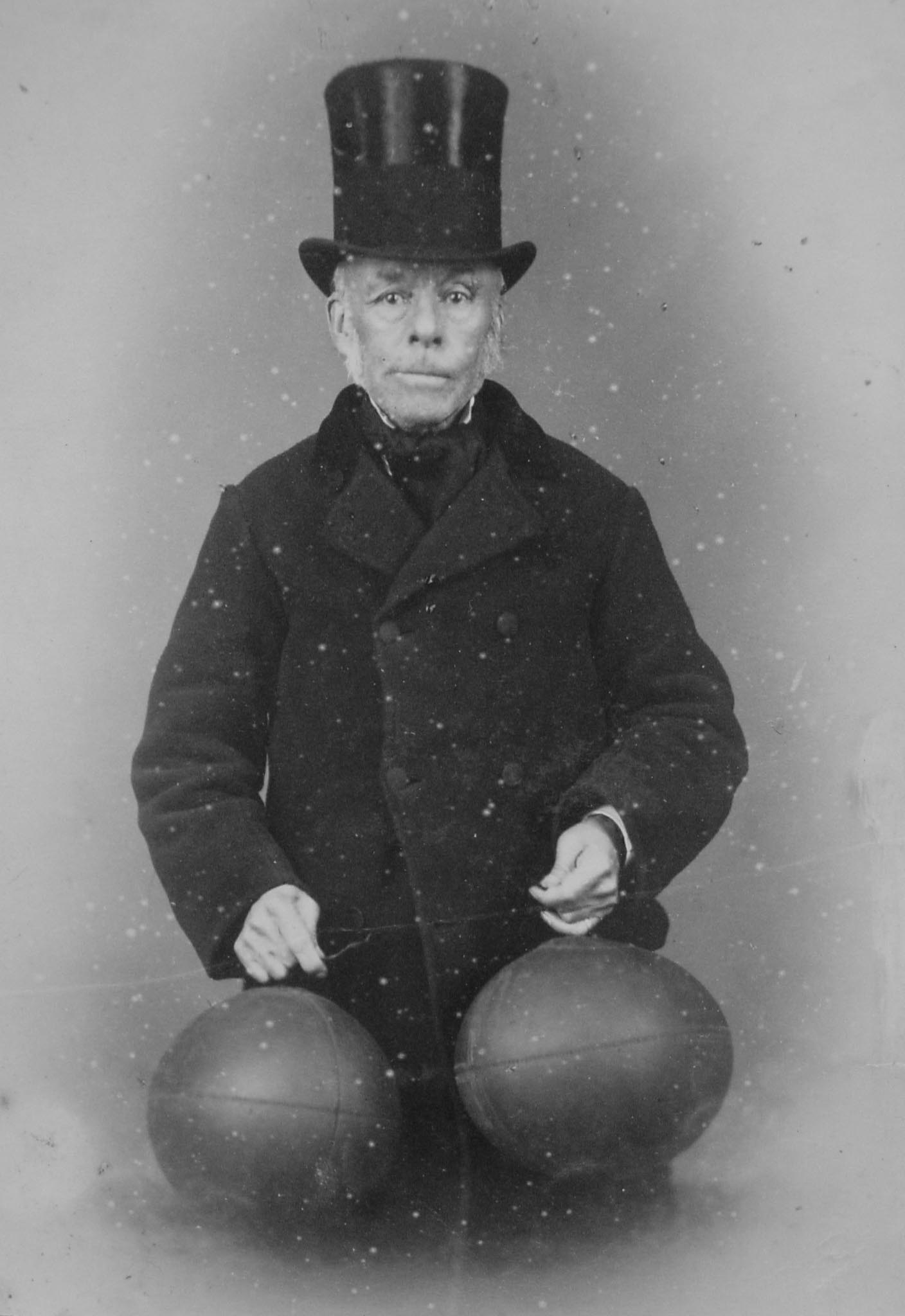
Early footballs with rubber bladders.

The early rules of football were determined by pupils before the game, with the legality of carrying or running with the ball often agreed shortly before commencement. The first set of written rules were published by pupils at Rugby School in 1845 and while a number of other clubs based their games on these rules there were still many variations played. The Football Association intended to frame a universal code of laws in 1863, but several newspapers published the 1848 Cambridge rules before they were finalised. The Cambridge rules included rules for "running with the ball" and "hacking" (kicking an opponent in the shins) which were not part of the Football Association draft. They decided not to include those rules in their release, causing a number of rugby clubs to break away from the Football Association.

The rules for playing rugby still differed between clubs, so in 1870 twenty one clubs formed the England-based Rugby Football Union (RFU) and standardised the laws of the game. As the game spread internationally disagreements arose over interpretations of the laws. Scotland, Ireland and Wales formed the International Rugby Football Board (IRFB) in 1886, with the RFU joining in 1890. The IRFB oversaw games between the four nations and in 1930 was made responsible for developing any new laws.

The balance in value between tries and conversions has changed greatly over the years. Historically, no points at all were awarded for a try, the reward being to "try" to score a goal (to kick the ball over the cross bar and between the posts). Scoring points from tries was not introduced until the late 1880s. Until 1891, a try scored one point and a conversion two. For the next two years tries scored two points and conversions three, until in 1893 when three points were awarded for a try and two for a kick. The number of points from a try increased to four in 1971 and five in 1992. In 1891 penalties were increased from two to three points, while drop goals were awarded four points (drop goals were subsequently reduced to three points in 1948). Before 1905 it was possible to score by kicking the ball through the posts from the ground in open play and in 1977 it was also possible to score three points by kicking a goal after taking a mark before both methods were banned in their respective years.

The defence was originally allowed to attempt to charge down a conversion kick from the moment the ball was placed on the ground, generally making it impossible for the kicker to place the ball himself and make any kind of a run-up. In 1958, the law governing conversions changed to allow the kicker to place the ball, prohibiting the defence from advancing toward the kicker until he begins his run-up.

The ball used until the 1860s was leather around a pigs bladder and was almost spherical. In 1862 rubber bladders were introduced and balls began to be manufactured with a more pronounced oval shape. In 1892 the RFU developed compulsory dimensions for the ball in the Laws of the Game for the first time. In the 1980s leather-encased balls were replaced with balls encased in synthetic waterproof materials. In 1877 the number of players was reduced from 20 to 15 a side.

The IRB trialled 23 changes to the modern laws in 2006 and some competitions in Scotland and Australia adopted them in 2007. In 2008, 13 of the variations were trialled globally. Important changes included: no gain in ground if the ball is kicked directly into touch after it has been moved back into the 22 by the kicking team; the offside lines for backs moved five metres from the scrum; allowing mauls to be legally pulled down and players to enter with their head lower than their hips; no restrictions on the number of players in a line-out; and allowing pregripping and lifting. In 2009 the IRB approved 10 of the laws, rejecting the laws relating to mauls and numbers in a line-out.

More recently, New Zealand Rugby, in co-operation with World Rugby, is set to trial several significant changes in the 2016 Mitre 10 Cup:

- Games will be officiated by two referees, as in the National Rugby League of Australian rugby league.
- The term "ruck" will be removed from the rules and replaced by "breakdown". A breakdown will form once one attacking player is over the ball on the ground. This in turn means that defenders can only make a play for the ball with their hands after a tackle if they arrive before any other attacking player.
- Tacklers' rights to the ball will be restricted to 180 degrees, instead of 360 as in the current laws. This makes it nearly impossible for a defender to steal the ball while making a tackle.
- Once a breakdown forms, players cannot play the ball with the hands, but can enter the breakdown from any angle as long as they were in an onside position.
- At the breakdown, the offside line will be one metre behind the hindmost foot.

== Objective ==
Rugby union is a contact sport that consists of two teams of fifteen players. The objective is to obtain more points than the opposition through scoring tries or kicking goals over 80 minutes of playing time, divided into two 40-minute halves.

Play is started with one team drop kicking the ball from the halfway line towards the opposition. The rugby ball can be moved up the field by either carrying it or kicking it. However, when passing the ball it can not be thrown forward. The opposition can stop players moving up the field by tackling them. Only players carrying the ball can be tackled and once a tackle is completed the opposition can compete for the ball.

Play stops when a try is scored, the ball crosses the side line or dead ball line, or an infringement occurs. After a team scores points, the other team restarts the game at the halfway with a drop kick towards the opposition. The team with the most points at the end wins the game.

== Field and equipment ==
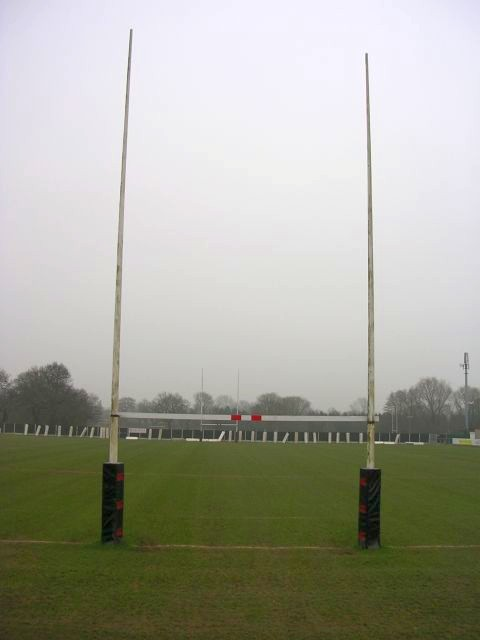
Dimensions of playing field (left); goal posts and try line (right)

Rugby union is played on a field, known as a pitch, that should have a grassy surface, though the Laws permit the use of artificial grass, clay, sand or snow, but not permanently hard surfaces such as asphalt or concrete. The Laws do not say that the pitch needs to be flat or level, merely that the surface must be safe to play on. If either team feels that the pitch is unsafe, the referee must try to resolve the issues and must not start the match if any part of the ground is considered to be dangerous.

The playing area consists of a field-of-play, not exceeding 70 metres (230 ft) in width and 100 metres (330 ft) in length, and in-goal areas at each end of the field-of-play which should extend not more than 22 metres (72 ft) but, "where practicable", at least 10 metres (33 ft) beyond the field-of-play. Solid lines are painted on to the field to mark the sides of the pitch (touch-lines), the rear of the in-goal areas (dead-ball lines), the sides of the in-goal areas (touch-in-goal lines), the goal-lines (also called the try line), lines 22 metres (72 ft) from each goal-line, and the half-way line. Broken lines are painted parallel to the half-way line and 10 metres (33 ft) from it, in each half of the field, and parallel to the touch-lines and 5 metres (16 ft) and 15 metres (49 ft) infield from touch on each side of the field-of-play. Dash lines are also marked 5 metres (16 ft) from (and parallel to) the goal-lines. In rugby union the edge of all lines nearest the centre of the field marks the actual boundary. Thus, touch-lines themselves are out of play, and a player standing on (or over) any part of the touch-line is regarded as being "in touch". Equally, if the ball is grounded on any part of the goal line it is regarded as having been grounded in goal (and a try is scored if grounded by an attacking player); and a ball that makes contact with the touch-line or dead-ball line is "dead".

There is a goal at each end of the field-of-play, positioned centrally on the goal-line, and consisting of a pair of vertical posts, each a minimum of 3.4 m (11 ft 2 in) high, placed 5.6 m (18 ft 4 1/2 in) apart and connected by a horizontal bar 3 m (9 ft 10 in) above the ground—giving each goal the shape of the letter 'H'. For the safety of the players, the lower portion of each goal post is usually encased in protective padding.

Flag posts, at least 1.2 m (3 ft 11 in) high, are positioned at the four corners of the field-of-play and at the corners of each in-goal area. These flags are not considered part of the touch-in-goal. If the ball or a player carrying the ball touches them the ball is not out of play unless it is grounded against a flag post. There are a further six flag posts positioned 2 m (6 ft 6 1/2 in) outside the field-of-play and in line with the 22-metre and half-way lines on each side of the pitch. All flag posts play no part in the game and are there solely for indicative purposes.

== Officials ==
Games are officiated by one referee who usually has two assistants, one on each side of the field. The referee is responsible for ensuring the game is played according to the laws, keeping the time and recording the score. Prior to the start of the match, the referee organises the team captains for a coin toss. The winner chooses to either kick-off or selects an end of the playing field to defend in the first half. If the decision is made to kick off, the loser of the coin toss chooses an end to defend, otherwise they must kick off. After half time the teams swap ends and the team that did not kick off in the first half starts play. The referee blows a whistle to begin each half, stop play or indicate a score. The assistant referees raise a flag if the ball has crossed the touch line or scored a goal. They can also signal foul play by holding the flag out horizontally and in some games are able to communicate with the referee using microphones. In higher level matches a fourth official is appointed who can replace an assistant if needed and is usually responsible for allowing the substitutions to enter the playing field. A television match official is also sometimes appointed and the referee can consult them if they are unsure of a score.

== Scoring ==
=== Tries and conversions ===
A try, worth five points, is scored when the ball is touched to the ground in the area between the opposition's try line and before the dead ball line (the "in goal"). A player can score a try by carrying the ball into the in goal and then touching it to the ground while holding on to it. No downward pressure is required, but the player must be holding the ball in at least one of their hands or at least one of their arms. If the ball lands in the opposition's in-goal, usually as a result of a kick or the opposition losing possession, a player can score by applying downward pressure with their hands, their arms, or the front of their body. In this situation, if the player is outside the field of play when they touch the ball, a try is still scored.

A try is still scored if the ball is grounded on the try line. If the ball touches the dead ball line or sidelines within the in goal it is considered to be "dead" (out of play) and a try cannot be scored. If a team is awarded a scrum near the try line they might attempt to push the opposition back into their own in goal. If the ball is kept in the scrum a player can dive on it as soon as it crosses the try line, scoring a "pushover try". Occasionally a team will infringe, possibly preventing a try being scored. If the referee believes a try would have been scored had the infringement not occurred they can award a "penalty try". Penalty tries are always awarded underneath the goalposts, no matter where the infringement occurred. Beginning in 2017, penalty tries are automatically worth seven points, negating the need to attempt a conversion. In the case of a jump ball from a cross-field kick, the ball cannot be punched out of play by a defender as you could in rugby league, it should be caught and grounded to get a 22m dropout instead.

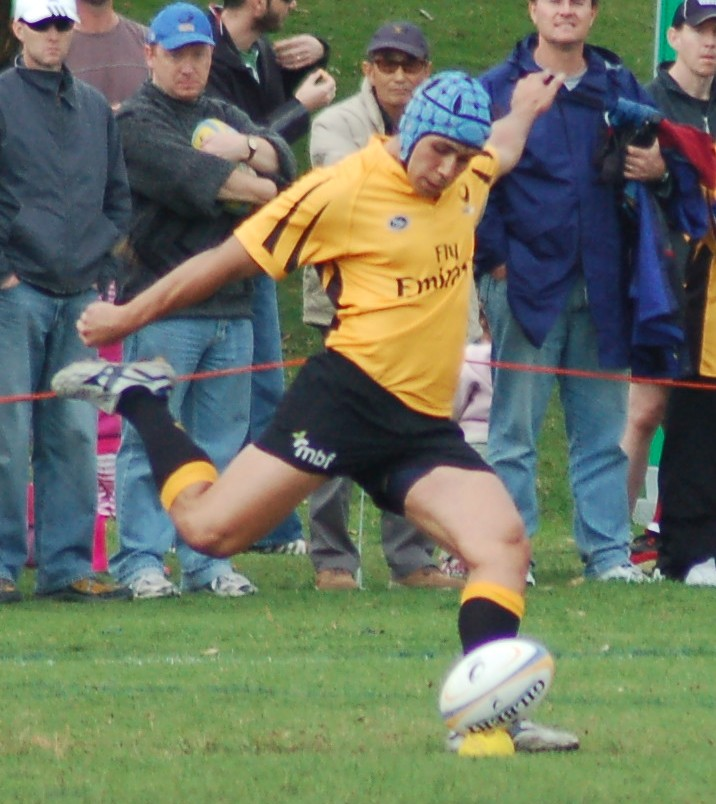
The ball is generally placed in a kicking tee when taking conversions or penalty shots at goal

When a try is awarded by the referee, the team scoring the try has the right to attempt a conversion. A conversion is a kick at goal that passes between the two posts and above the crossbar. The ball has to be either place kicked or drop kicked, and if successful will earn the team two points. The conversion attempt is taken from a spot perpendicular to where the try was scored and must be completed within one minute from the time the player has indicated his intention to kick. The opposition must stand behind their goal line. When the kicker moves in any direction they may run at the kicker in an attempt to charge the ball down or put the kicker off. They cannot shout while doing this, but if the ball falls over after the kicker has started his approach they can continue with the charge.

=== Penalty and drop goals ===
Successful shots at goal after a penalty or a drop kick score three points. Like conversions, penalty shots at goal must occur within one minute from the time the player has indicated his intention to kick, but they can only use a place kick. The opposition have to retire back 10 metres (33 ft) (or to their goal line if it is closer) and stand still with their arms at their sides until after the ball is kicked. If the player does not indicate an intention to take a kick at goal and then scores a goal from a drop kick, the goal stands. However, if a drop goal is attempted from a free kick it will not count unless the ball has been first touched by an opposition player, been made dead or a tackle has been completed. The same laws apply if the team opts for a scrum in place of the free kick. In all other situations a drop kick can be attempted at any time during general play.

After the try has been scored and conversion attempted, or after the goal has been scored via the penalty kick or drop goal, the scoring team will surrender the ball to the other team to restart play via a kick restart.

== Game structure ==
=== Kick restarts ===
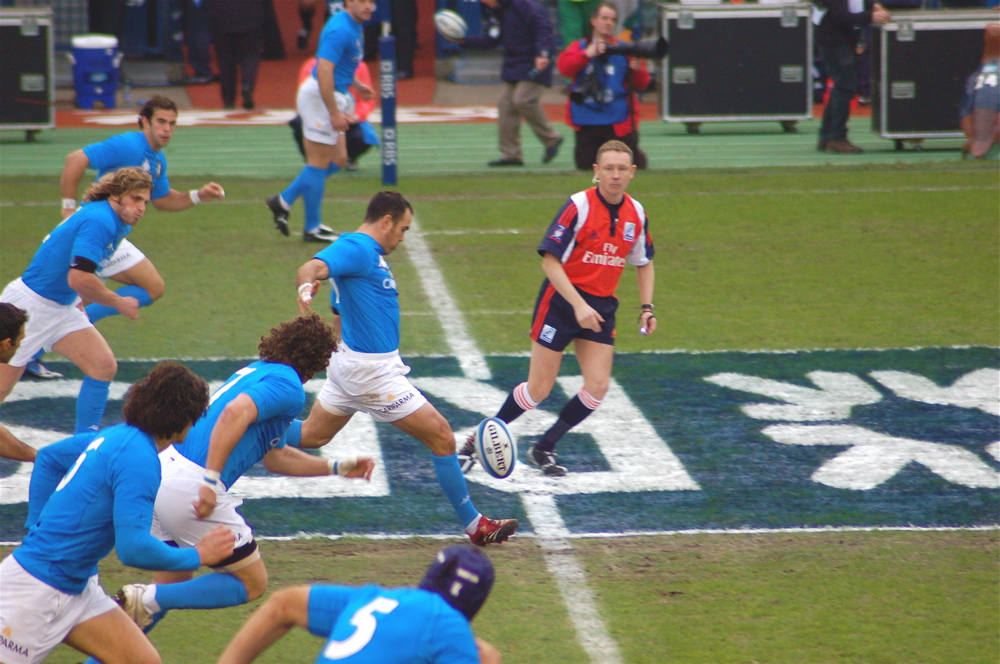
Players must be behind the ball at a kick-off

Play is started at the beginning of each half, and after a score has been made by a kick-off. The kicking team takes a drop kick from the middle of the halfway line to begin play. The ball must travel beyond the 10-metre (33 ft) line in the opposition half. None of the kicking team's players are allowed in front of the ball until after it has been kicked. Drop-outs are used to restart play when the attacking team puts the ball into the oppositions in-goal and it is grounded by a defender or if it goes over the dead-ball or touch-in-goal line. If the ball is kicked through the in goal they also have the option of taking a scrum from where the ball was kicked.

=== General play ===
After a successful kickoff the ball is in general play and can be passed, kicked, caught, picked up or grounded by any player. The player holding the ball can travel in any direction, providing they do not use teammates to obstruct defenders from making a tackle. They can pass the ball to another player as long as it does not leave their hands forward (momentum can carry the ball forward though). The ball cannot be dropped forward or travel forward after touching a player's hand or arm. If the ball is kicked, teammates are offside if they are in front of the kicker and can only begin moving forward when they are passed by the kicker or a player that began chasing from behind the kicker. If the ball lands within 10 metres (33 ft) of players from the kicker's team, they must actively move backwards until they are 10 metres (33 ft) from where the ball lands or put onside by a teammate. When the opposition carries the ball forward five metres, intentionally touches the ball, or passes or kicks the ball, all the chasing players are put onside.

=== Breakdowns ===
==== Tackle ====
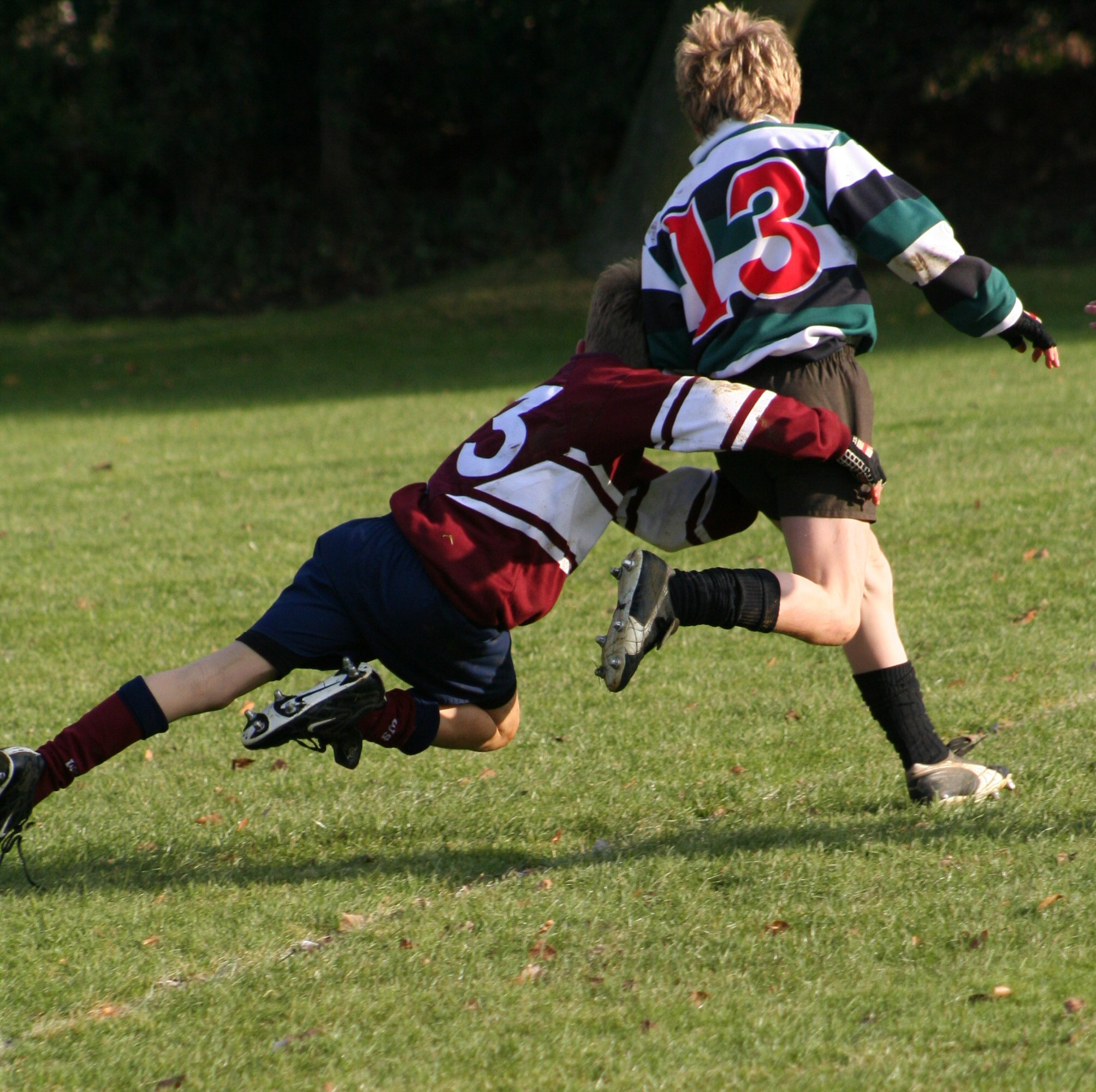
A rugby tackle: tackles must be below the neck with the aim of impeding or grounding the player with the ball

To stop a player running with the ball, the opposition will try to tackle them. Only players carrying the ball can be tackled. The tackle is complete when the ball-carrier is brought to the ground; this is judged to be the case as soon as a knee touches the ground while being held by the opposition. The tackler is designated as any player that also goes to ground when making the tackle. If no player goes to ground when tackling a player, then there is no tackler. The tackler has to immediately let the tackled player go and get to their feet before attempting to compete for the ball. If they do not get to their feet, they must roll away from the tackled player. The player that is tackled must immediately play the ball by pushing, passing or placing it in any direction. If a player is involved in the tackle, but does not go to ground, they must also release the tackled player, allowing them the chance to play the ball. Only players on their feet, and supporting their own weight, may pick up the ball and any players on the ground must not prevent them from gaining possession. Except for the tackler (player who went to ground when making the tackle) and the tackled player, all other players must enter the tackle area from behind the ball. The tackle must not be dangerous. Dangerous tackles are ones that make contact with their opponent around their neck or head, with a locked elbow and extended arm ("stiff arm"), without using their arms ("shoulder charge"), when they are in the air, when they don't have the ball, or ones that drive or drop a players head or neck into the ground while their feet are in the air ("spear tackle"). Using a foot to trip a player is also illegal.

==== Ruck ====
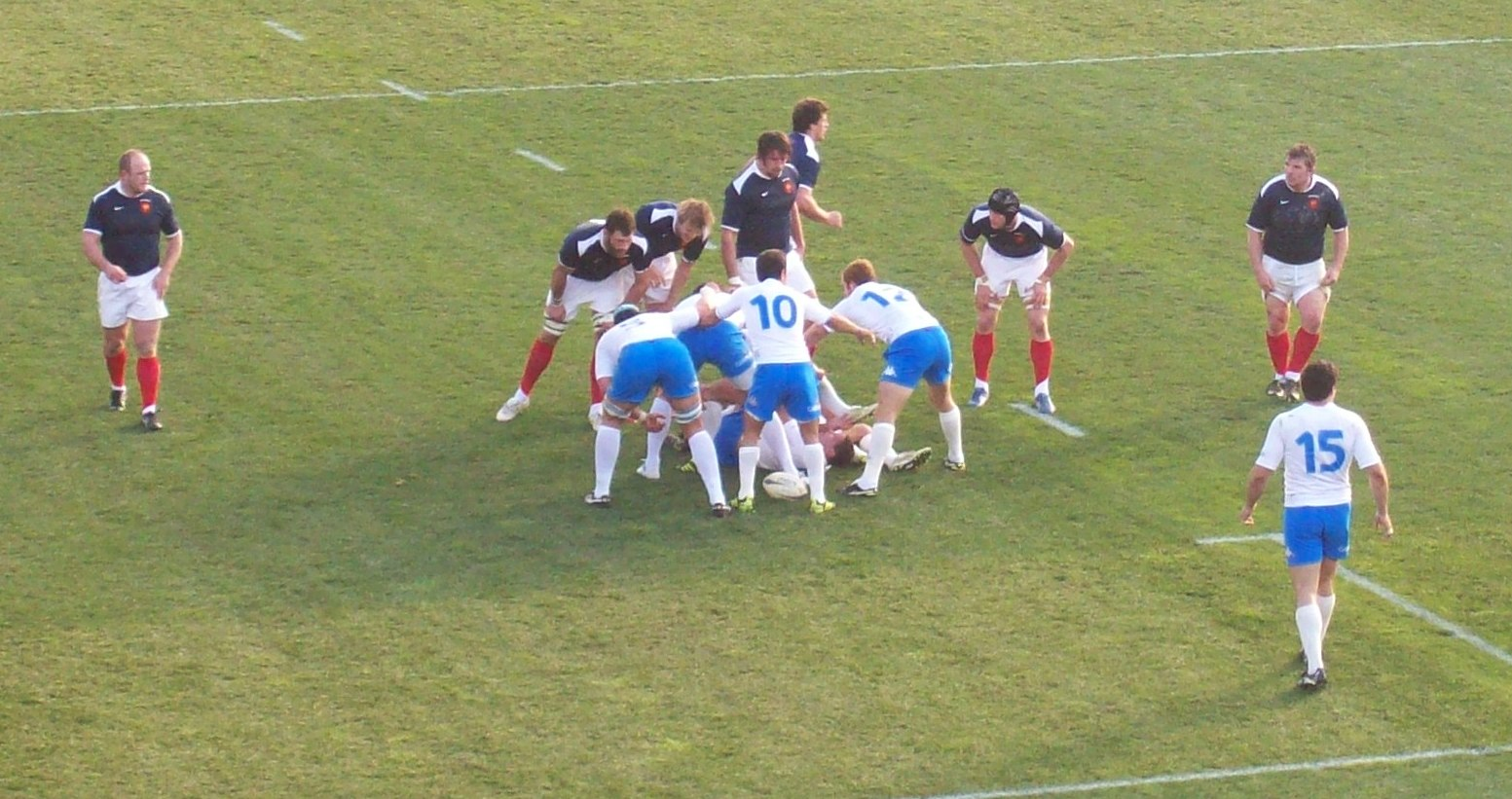
A ruck is formed when at least one player from each team are on their feet and bound over the top of the ball.

After a tackle, a ruck will sometimes form. This occurs when at least one player from each side bind onto each other with the ball on the ground between them. Additional players may join the ruck, but must do so from behind the rearmost foot of the hindmost teammate in the ruck (often referred to as "coming through the gate") and bind onto the body of a teammate. The offside line for uninvolved players is perpendicular to the last feet of the rearmost player on their side of the ruck and they must remain behind this line until the ball emerges. In a ruck, no player may use their hands to win the ball, except if they were on their feet and had their hands on the ball before the ruck formed. Teams try to win the ball by pushing the opposition off it or by using their feet to "ruck" it to their side. One player (in many cases the scrum-half) directly behind the ruck may reach in and retrieve the ball from the ruck provided they do not participate in the ruck (that is, they do not bind on to an opponent) and stay behind the offside line. A player doing so may not be tackled or grasped by an opponent in the ruck until he or she has played the ball, as this would violate the laws on tackling players without the ball. Players in a ruck must stay on their feet and not deliberately ruck or step on players lying on the ground. Players who are on the ground at a ruck must not impede the ball as it emerges from the ruck. The ruck ends when the ball emerges, a player commits an offence and is penalised or it becomes unplayable and a scrum is awarded. An amendment to the laws on this point is currently being trialled, under which a team which is able to retrieve the ball from the ruck must do so within five seconds. This is to prevent time-wasting; for instance by a team which is leading as the end of the game approaches.

==== Maul ====
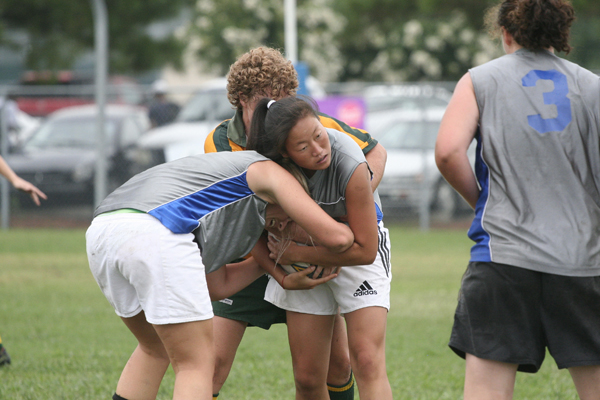
The fewest players that can form a maul is three; the ball carrier, a defender and one of the ball carrier's teammates.

A maul is formed when a player carrying the ball is held by one or more opponents, and then one or more of the ball carrier's teammates bind onto the ball carrier. Players that join the maul must join from behind the hindmost foot of their most hindmost teammate. Players in the maul must try to stay on their feet, although the ball carriers may go to ground as long as they make the ball available immediately. Deliberately collapsing, jumping on or dragging players out of the maul is illegal. Players not in the maul or who leave the maul must retire behind the hindmost foot of the player at the back of the maul. The maul successfully ends when the ball or a player carrying the ball leaves the maul, the ball ends up on the ground (becomes a ruck), or the ball is carried over the sideline. If all the players of one team voluntarily leave the maul, the maul continues, with the offside line for the leaving players the front foot of the leading player still in the maul. If the maul stops, it must start again, or the ball must emerge, within five seconds, otherwise it has ended unsuccessfully. It can only restart once; the second time the ball must emerge in five seconds. If the maul collapses and it is not the result of illegal play, it is also an unsuccessful end. All unsuccessful endings result in a scrum being formed, with the defending team putting the ball into the scrum.

=== Set pieces ===
==== Scrum ====
Diagram showing the relative body positions of the players in a Rugby union scrum.

A scrum may be formed if a team commits a minor infringement or play needs to be restarted. It consists of the eight forwards from both teams binding together in three rows, with the two front rows bound and pushing against each other. The two props (loosehead and tighthead) on either side of the hooker form the front row. The second row consists of two locks and the two flankers, while the number 8 is the third row (back row). If an infringement occurs, the team that did not make the mistake is awarded the scrum. Infringements that result in a scrum are: knocking or passing the ball forward, a player being accidentally offside, a player being in front of the kicker during a kick-off or drop-out, delay (one minute) in taking a kick from a mark or taking a shot at goal from a penalty, or if a player incorrectly taps the ball at a penalty or free kick.

A scrum is used to restart play if the ball becomes unplayable at a tackle, ruck or line-out and it is not due to a player offending. The team that was moving forward before the ball became unplayable is awarded the scrum; if no team was moving forward it is awarded to the attacking team. If the ball is stuck in a maul, the scrum is awarded against the team that had possession of the ball prior to the maul forming. An exception is if it forms directly after a player catches a kick during general play (not a kick-off or drop-out) on the full. In this case, the team of the player catching the ball feeds the scrum. If a defending player carries the ball into their own in-goal and grounds it or makes it dead, a scrum is awarded to the attacking team five metres out from the try-line. If an attacking player gets into his opponents in-goal, but is unable to ground the ball, or the referee is unsure if the ball was grounded, play restarts with an attacking scrum five metres from the try-line. Scrums are also used to restart play if the ball touches the referee during general play giving one team an advantage, play is stopped due to an injured player or if a team manages to legally prevent a player taking a free kick.

If a team makes a mistake when taking a kick-off or 22-metre drop-out, the opposition are given the option of either restarting play with a scrum or receiving the kick again. This applies if the ball is kicked using the wrong type of kick, from the incorrect place, into the in-goal area without being touched by the opposing team, or less than ten metres from a kick-off or not across the 22-metre line from a drop-out without being touched by the receiving team. If the ball is kicked from a "restart" across the sideline on the full, they also have the options of restarting play with a line-out at halfway or on the 22-metre line. If, during general play, the ball is kicked through the in-goal and over the dead ball line or into touch-in-goal (except for attempted drop goals) the defending team can either restart with a 22-metre drop-out or take a scrum from where the ball was kicked. If the ball is received in the in-goal, the player can either ground the ball (resulting in a goal line drop out, or to make the ball dead (resulting in a 5-metre scrum) If a line-out is taken incorrectly (ball not travelling 5 metres, player stepping into the field of play when throwing the ball in, ball not thrown straight – or forward if it is a quick throw in) the opposing team has the option to take a scrum fifteen metres in from the side line or to throw the ball in themselves. A team can also opt for a scrum in place of a "mark", free kick or penalty.

A scrum showing the body positions of the forwards, as well as the position of both scrum-half and the referee.

A scrum is formed as near to where the infringement or stoppage occurred and at least five metres from either goal line. A normal scrum contains eight players from each team. If, for some reason, a team is reduced below fifteen men, the scrum numbers can also be reduced, although there can never be fewer than five. The hookers binds with their props, the locks bind each other and their front row, with all the other players in the scrum binding to the locks. The referee makes a mark where the scrum is to be formed and waits for both teams to bind together. The referee then calls "Crouch" (both front rows must crouch down) "Bind" (the props secure binds on each other's shoulders) and then "Set", at which point both packs' rows engage. When Set is called, the two front rows can come together and everyone in the scrum must stay bound until it is completed. Once the referee is happy with the engagement, the scrum-half from the team awarded the fee throws the ball into the tunnel (gap) between the two front rows.

The scrum must remain stationary and all the feet of both front rows must be on the ground until the scrum-half has put the ball in. The scrum-half must put the ball into the middle of the scrum, using both hands without delay or "dummying" (pretending to put the ball in). Front row players can only strike for the ball with a single foot once it is in the tunnel. Players cannot intentionally collapse the scrum or force players upwards out of the scrum at any time during a scrum. Both sides must try to push straight against one another, and deliberately pushing at an angle or pulling on an opponent to rotate (or "wheel") the scrum are penalised but if the contest between them results in the scrum rotating more than 90 degrees the scrum is reset with the ball going to the opposition. The opposition scrum half stands next to the feeding half and can follow the ball through the scrum as long as both feet remain behind the ball. The opposition scrum half can also move to the other side of the scrum or away from the scrum, but in this situation must stay behind the number eights feet.

Before a team begins a game they must have five players who are capable of playing in the front row in the team. If a front-row player gets sent off or suspended and no one on the field can play in the front row at the next scrum the team captain chooses another player to leave the field to be replaced by a reserve front rower. If, due to sendings-off or injury, there are no replacement front-row players available then the scrums become uncontested. Uncontested scrums are subject to the same laws as normal scrums, except there is no pushing and the team putting the ball into the scrum is granted possession without contest. When a scrum is awarded close to the tryline, the attacking team can push the opposition back into the in-goal, controlling the ball in the scrum. If the ball crosses the tryline and a player grounds it, a "pushover try" is scored.

==== Line out ====
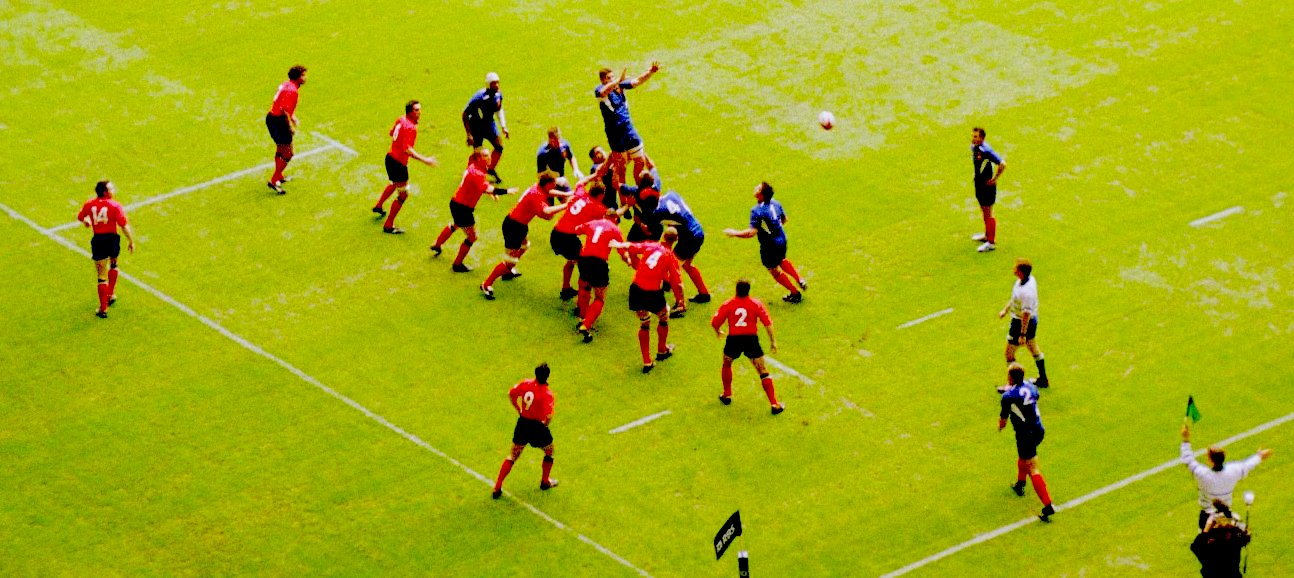
The usual position of players at a line-out just after the ball has been thrown in.

When the ball crosses the sideline during general play a line-out is formed with the team that did not put the ball into touch throwing it in, unless it was kicked into touch from a penalty kick, in which case the team kicking to touch throws in. If the ball is kicked directly (does not bounce first) over the sideline by a team member who is outside his 22-metre line, the line-out is formed on the sideline perpendicular to where that player kicked it. The same rule applies if the ball is moved (passed, knocked, kicked or run) back inside the 22 by a player from the same team as the kicker. Once a tackle, scrum, line-out, ruck or maul occurs inside the 22 or the ball is moved there by the opposition a player can kick it directly into touch with the line-out forming where the ball crossed the sideline. If the ball bounces before crossing the sideline or is carried across by a player the line-out is formed where the ball crossed the line. However, a line-out can never take place within five metres of the ingoal area, and is always moved back to a mark five metres out.

A line-out consists of at least two players from each team standing in two straight lines between five and fifteen metres from, and at right angles to, the scoring bay. The gap between the two teams must be 1 metre and the opposing team cannot have more players in the line-out than the team that was last in 'fluid possession'. One player from each team has to stand two metres back from the line-out to receive the ball and the opposing team must have a player standing at the front of the line-out two metres from the centre of the line-out. The player throwing the ball stands outside the field of play and must throw it at least five metres down the centre of the line-out. If the throw in is incorrect the opposing team has the choice of taking a scrum fifteen metres from the sideline or throwing the ball in themselves. The player throwing the ball in must not delay or pretend to throw the ball in. Players not taking part in the line-out must stand back ten metres or on the goal line if that is closer.

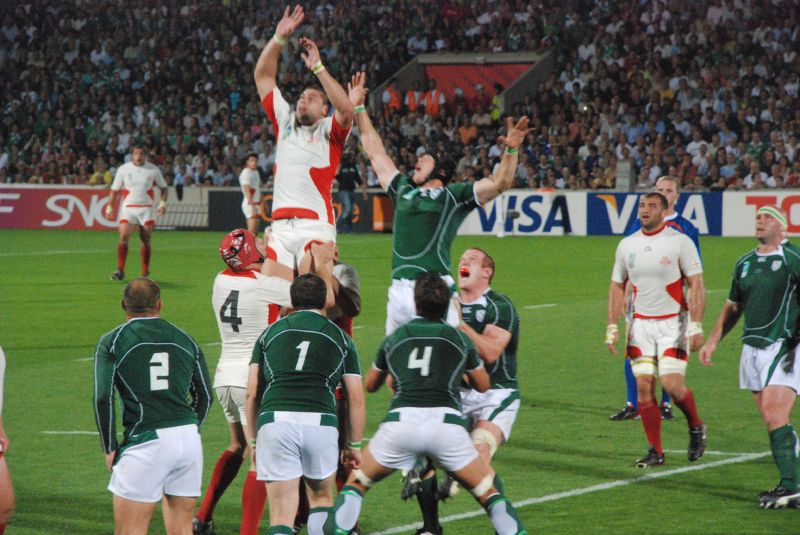
Two locks from different teams being lifted by players when competing for the ball.

Once the ball has been thrown players from both sides can be lifted and supported in the air as they compete for the ball. They are not allowed to push, hold or support themselves on opposition players. When attempting to win the ball players, unless both hands are above their head, must use both hands or their inside hand. Players cannot leave the line-out until it ends and those not involved in the line-out must not move forward until it ends. The line-out ends when the ball is knocked, passed or kicked out of the line-out, when the ball goes beyond fifteen or within five metres from touch, when a ruck or maul moves beyond the centre of the line-out or a player with the ball detaches from a maul.

There are three main exceptions to the normal laws regarding line-outs. One is a line-out following a penalty and the other is the quick throw-in. If a team is awarded a penalty they have the option of kicking the ball into touch for a line-out. They can kick the ball directly into touch from anywhere on the field and the line-out will take place where the ball crossed the line. They also get to throw the ball in at the line-out. The second is a quick throw which occurs when a player throws the ball in before the line-out has had a chance to form. The ball can be thrown in anywhere from where the ball crossed the sideline to the players own goal line. The same ball that went into touch must be used and if the ball has touched another person (not including the person throwing it in, but including other players, replacements, spectators, coaching staff or anyone else not involved in the game) or a line-out has formed (two players from each team) then a quick throw in can not be taken. The ball must travel five metres before it touches the ground or a player and can only be thrown in straight or backwards. The third is a 50:22 kick, where a player kicks the ball from inside their own half (with the relevant phase having commenced in their own half) and the ball goes indirectly into touch (i.e: it bounces in field first) in the opponent's 22. In such a case, the attacking team will have the throw in to the line-out.

== Penalties and free kicks ==
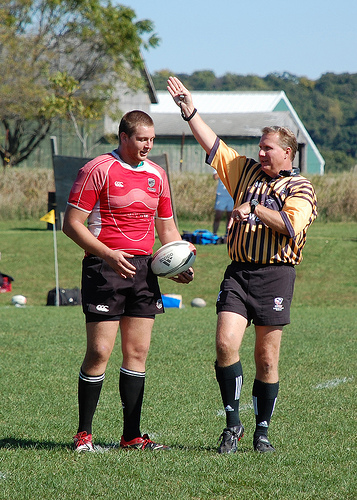
A referee signals a penalty by raising a straight arm on the non-offending team's side.

If a minor infringement occurs a scrum or free kick is awarded to the non-offending team. For more serious misdemeanors the referee awards a penalty. If the non-offending team gains an advantage the referee can allow play to continue. The referee has wide discretion on whether any advantage has occurred; with penalty advantages needing a greater gain than scrum advantages. If no advantage is gained play is taken back to where the infringement occurred. The penalty or free kick is taken where the infringement occurred, or moved out five metres if it is close to the goal line. The ball can be kicked in any direction and played at again by the person kicking it. The rest of the team must stay behind the kicker until the ball has been kicked. The opposition must retire ten metres or to their goal-line.

Penalties are awarded if a player is caught offside, is involved in foul play, offends at the tackle, ruck or maul, or is involved in dangerous play at scrums and line-outs. Foul play includes intentionally or repeatedly offending, throwing the ball into touch, obstructing the opposition, or misconduct. Examples of misconduct are striking, stamping, kicking or tripping players, illegal tackles and contact with players after they have kicked the ball. Dangerous play at line-outs is pushing, charging, obstructing or levering on an opponent. Dangerous play at scrums is charging at opponents not correctly binding to opponents, the hooker swinging (using both feet to strike the ball), twisting, dipping or lifting an opponent collapsing. Other offences that result in penalties are if a team has too many players, wearing illegal clothing, throwing the ball deliberately into touch, intentionally knocking the ball on, not releasing the ball if taking into touch, incorrect numbers in a scrum, handling in the scrum and the scrum-half kicking the ball in the scrum.

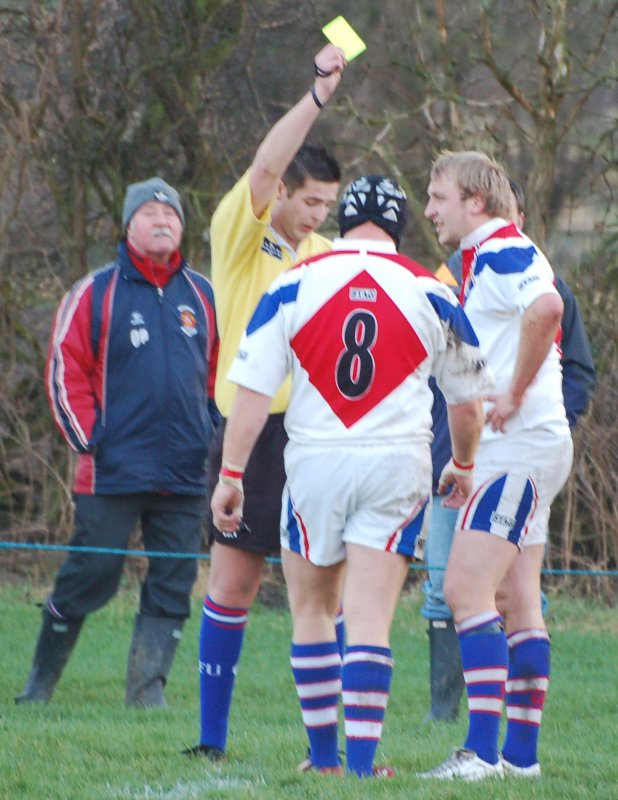
A yellow card indicates the player has committed a cautionable offence and must spend ten minutes out of the game. The player can not be replaced during this time.

The referee may punish a player's misconduct by using penalty cards. A yellow card indicates caution, a red card indicates a player has been sent off. Players may be cautioned for foul or dangerous conduct, for persistent breaches of the same rule, or for deliberate infringement to prevent their opponents from gaining a decisive advantage. A player receiving a caution is temporarily suspended from play for ten minutes. This has become known as the sin-bin. If the same player subsequently commits a further cautionable offence, he is sent off for the rest of the game. A player can also be sent off permanently, without first being cautioned, for serious foul play.

Free kicks are awarded for technical infringements that do not warrant a penalty. This includes indiscretions like players time wasting, charging over the 22-metre line during the oppositions drop-out, pushing in a ruck with their head lower than their hips, returning the ball to a ruck or maul, pretending to clear the ball from a ruck or maul and preventing the ball being thrown in at a quick line-out. Many infringements are penalised by free kicks during line-outs, including delaying or pretending to throw the ball in (balking), having less than two or more numbers than the opposition, leaving once the line-out has formed, failure to form a line-out, standing closer than five metres or over fifteen metres from the sideline, the receiver or opposition hooker (or equivalent player) standing in the incorrect position, not forming a straight line, not keeping a metre gap between the two lines, lifting a player below the shorts from behind or below the thighs from in front, jumping before the ball is thrown in, not lowering any lifted player, using only the outside arm to catch or deflect the ball or leaving the line-out before the ball is thrown, Free kicks awarded at scrums are for delay in forming a scrum, incorrect or early binding of the front rows, pushing before the ball is fed, front rows feet off the ground before the ball is fed, the scrumhalf not feeding the ball in correctly or straight, intentionally kicking the ball out of the tunnel, bringing the ball back into the scrum after it has emerged, a non-front row player hooking the ball from the tunnel or the scrum half pretending to clear the ball from the scrum.

If a team is awarded a penalty they can choose to take a shot at goal, kick the ball or tap the ball with their foot and run it. A successful shot at goal scores three points. The opposing team must stand still with their hands beside their sides until after the ball has been kicked at the goal. If the ball is kicked into touch the team that kicked it gets the throw in at the resulting line-out and it is always taken where the ball crosses the line. Free kicks are similar, except a shot at goal can not be taken and if the ball is kicked into touch the kicking team does not receive the throw at the ensuing line-out. There is also no gain in ground from the free kick if kicked directly into touch, unless it was taken from behind the kicking team's 22-metre line. Opposition players can also try and charge down free kicks as soon as the kicker makes a move to kick. The captain can always choose to take a scrum from a penalty or free kick. A player can claim a mark by catching the ball directly from a kick (except a kick-off) inside their own 22 and shouting "mark" at the same time. The player that claimed the mark cannot be tackled and is awarded a free kick.

== Variations ==
=== Under 19 ===
The laws are modified for younger age groups. The World Rugby enforced under 19 variations allow substituted players to replace anyone injured and if there are 22 in a team at least 6 must play in the front row. A game consists of two 35-minute halves and scrums can only be pushed 1.5 metres and must not be wheeled.

=== Rugby Sevens ===
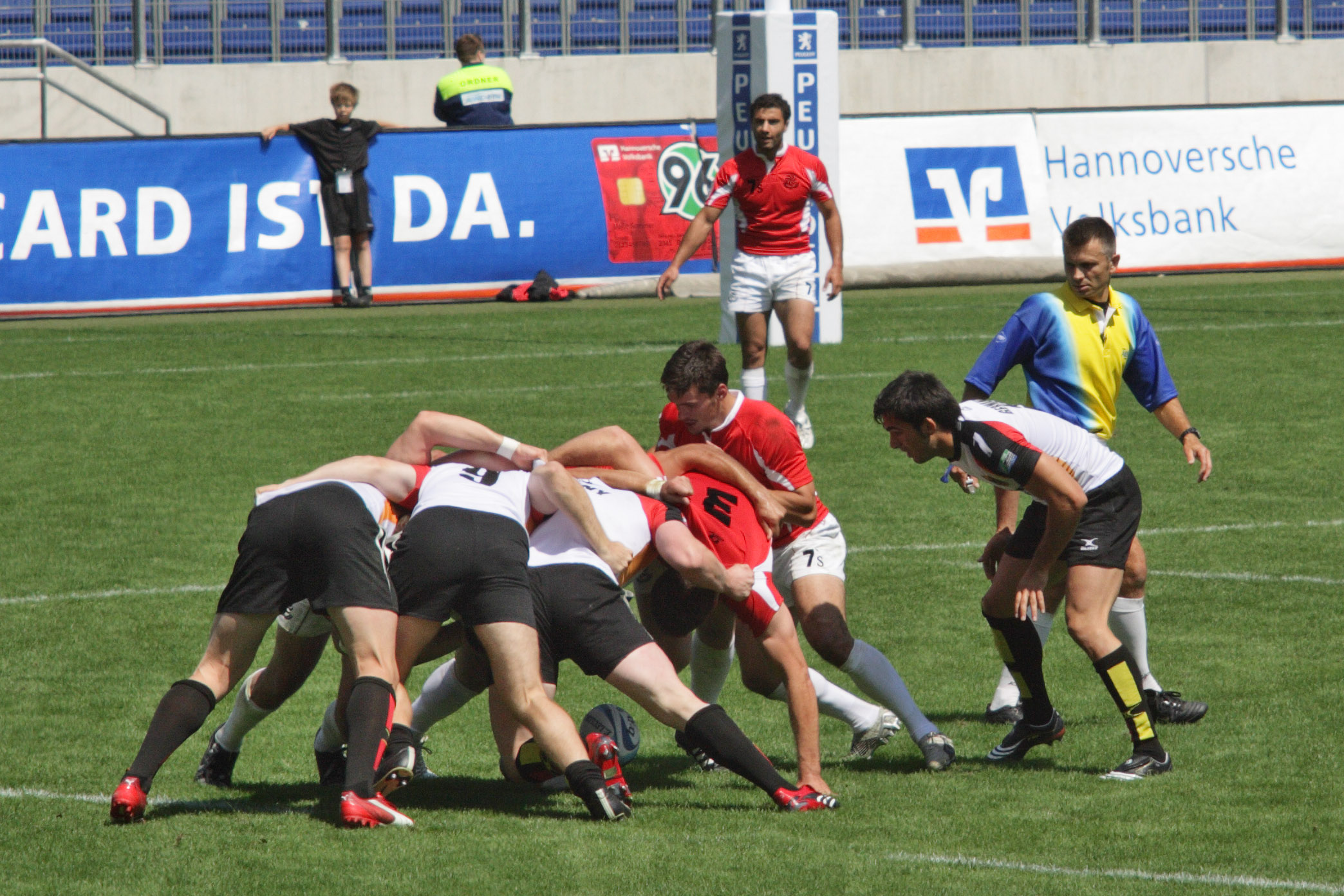
A sevens scrum

Rugby seven teams have seven players on the field and can nominate five substitutes, but only three may play any one game. Games last for 14 minutes (7-minute halves) except for finals which can consist of two ten-minute halves. In international competitions there are two ingoal touch judges (one at each end) that assist the referee in determining successful shots at goal, touch in-goal and tries. Conversions are drop goals that must be taken within 40 seconds and the opposition must wait near the halfway. A player temporarily suspended must leave the game for two minutes; two yellows risks a red card. The scoring team restarts play by kicking off from the halfway. Free kicks are awarded to the opposition at the halfway if the ball does not travel ten metres, goes directly into touch or into the in-goal, or the kickers team are in front. Scrums are formed with three players.

== Bibliography ==
- Griffiths, John (1987). The Phoenix Book of International Rugby Records. London: Phoenix House. ISBN 0-460-07003-7.
- Laws of the game: Rugby Union (PDF). International Rugby Board. 2011. ISBN 978-1-907506-09-3. Archived from the original (PDF) on 3 March 2011.
