= Drop kick (rugby union) =

A drop kick in rugby union is a type of kick that involves someone dropping a ball and then kicking when it hits the ground, in contrast to a punt wherein the dropper kicks the ball without letting it hit the ground first.

In rugby union, a drop kick is used for the kick-off and restarts and to score a field or drop goal. Originally it was one of only two ways to score points, along with the place kick.

Drop kicks are mandatory:

- from the centre spot to start a half (a kick-off)
- from the centre spot to restart the game after points have been scored
- to restart play from the 22-metre line or goal-line (called a drop-out) after the ball is touched down or made dead in the in-goal area by the defending team when the attacking team kicked or took the ball into the in-goal area
- to score a field goal or drop goal (or dropped goal) in open play, which is worth three points.

Drop kicks are optional:

- for a conversion kick after a try has been scored, but this is rare, as place kicks are generally used for the conversion
- for a penalty kick to score a penalty goal, but this is rare, as place kicks are generally used
- when kicking for touch (the sideline) from a penalty, although the option of a punt kick is usually taken instead.

Additionally, in rugby sevens, the drop kick is used for all conversion attempts which must be taken within 40 seconds of the try being scored.

== Technique ==
The drop kick technique in rugby union is to hold the ball with one end pointing downwards in two hands above the kicking leg, and the fingers pointing to the ground. The ball is dropped onto the ground in front of the kicking foot, which makes contact at the moment or fractionally after the ball touches the ground, called the half-volley. The kicking foot usually makes contact with the ball slightly on the instep.

In a rugby union kick-off or drop out, the kicker usually aims to kick the ball very high but not a great distance, and so usually strikes the ball after it has started to bounce upwards off the ground, so the contact is made close to the bottom of the ball.

For the tactics of the drop goal in open play (field goal), see drop goal.
