= Blitz =

Blitz, German for "lightning", may refer to:

== Military uses ==
- Blitzkrieg, blitz campaign, or blitz, a type of military campaign
- The Blitz, the German aerial campaign against Britain in the Second World War
- SMS Blitz, several ships of the Prussian, Imperial German, and Austro-Hungarian navies

== Computing ==
- Blitz (software), a cloud-based load-and performance-testing service
- Blitz BASIC, a dialect of the BASIC programming language
- Blitz++, a C++ class library for scientific computing
- BlitzMail, the internal e-mail network at Dartmouth College
- Blitz Research, a New Zealand software company

== Film and television ==
- Blitz (2011 film), a film starring Jason Statham
- Blitz (2024 film), a World War II-themed historical drama film
- Blitz or Killing Cars, a 1986 Michael Verhoeven film
- Blitz, a fictional anthropomorphic doberman from Road Rovers
- Blitz, a robot dog from the cartoon C.O.P.S.
- The Blitz, in the "Blitzgiving" episode of How I Met Your Mother

== Games ==
- Blitz (game), a card game
- Blitz (video game), a VIC-20 game
- NFL Blitz, a series of American football video games featuring over-the-top action
  - Blitz: The League, a 2005 American football video game extension of the NFL Blitz series
- Blitz chess, fast chess in which each player is allotted from three to five minutes (as noted chess.com) but loosely defined as from one to ten minutes (see bullet chess and rapid chess for clarification)
- Blitz Games, a British computer games company
- Blitz, a playable character in Tom Clancy's Rainbow Six Siege
- London Blitz (video game), an Atari 2600 game by Avalon Hill
- World of Tanks Blitz, a mobile game based on the PC version (WoT) World of Tanks

== Literature ==
- Blitz (British magazine), an influential British "style" magazine of the 1980s
- Blitz (Portuguese magazine), a Portuguese music magazine, started in 1984 as a newspaper
- Blitz (newspaper), Indian investigative newspaper, started in 1941 by Russi Karanjia
- Weekly Blitz, a weekly Bangladeshi newspaper
- Blitz (Big Bang Comics), a Flash-based Big Bang Comics hero
- Blitz (Marvel Comics)
- Blitz, the alter-ego of George in the web comic Bob and George

== Music ==
- Blitz (British band), a punk rock band
- Blitz (Brazilian band), a new-wave band from the 1980s
- Bobby Ellsworth or Blitz, American heavy metal singer
- Blitz (Étienne Daho album) (2017)
- Blitz (KMFDM album) (2009)
- The Blitz (Krokus album) (1984)
- The Blitz (Thebandwithnoname album) (2002)
- Blitz!, a musical by Lionel Bart
- "Blitz", a song by Audio Adrenaline from Some Kind of Zombie (1997)
- "Blitz" and "Blitz V2", songs by American rapper SoFaygo (2022)

== Nightclubs ==
- Blitz Club, a techno nightclub in Munich, Germany
- Blitz, a 1980s night club in London frequented by the Blitz Kids (New Romantics)

== Sports ==
=== American football ===
- Blitz (gridiron football), a type of defensive tactic
- The Blitz (ESPNEWS), a TV show on ESPNEWS
- Blitz (mascot), the mascot of the Seattle Seahawks
- Bakersfield Blitz, a former arena football team
- Chicago Blitz, a United States Football League team in the 1980s
- Chicago Blitz (indoor football), a defunct professional indoor football team
- Chicago Blitz (X League), an American women's gridiron football team
- London Blitz (American football), a London-based team
- Montreal Blitz, a women's team
- Syracuse Blitz, a former Professional Indoor Football League team

=== Other sports ===
- Blitz defence, a defensive technique used in rugby union
- SV Blitz Breslau, a defunct German association football team
- Blitz (company), a Japanese tuning company which competes in the D1 Grand Prix

== Other uses ==
- Blitz (surname), a surname and list of people with the name
- Opel Blitz, various German lorries built by Opel from 1930 to 1975
- Blitz (movement), a radical youth movement in Norway
- Blitz campaign, or blitz, a type of marketing campaign

== See also ==
- Blitzkrieg (disambiguation)
- Blitzer (disambiguation)
- Blits (disambiguation)
- Utah Blitzz, former professional soccer team
- Blitzy, a fictional dog character from Mona the Vampire
- Bristol Blitz, the German bombing raids on Bristol, England in 1940 and 1941
- Hull Blitz, the German Second World War bombing campaign targeting Kingston upon Hull
- Rotterdam Blitz, the German bombing raid on Rotterdam, Netherlands in 1940
- World of Tanks Blitz, an online game
