= Blitzkrieg (disambiguation) =

Blitzkrieg is a military term describing the use of overwhelming force and rapid speed.

Blitzkrieg may also refer to:

== People ==
- Fabulous Blitzkrieg, professional wrestler also known as Blitzkrieg
- Blitzkrieg II, a stage name of professional wrestler Jack Evans
- Blitz Krieg (Andy Eastwood), a guitarist of the British rock band The Count Bishops

== Arts, entertainment, media ==
- "Blitz Krieg", a 2000 TV episode of One Piece season 1

=== Fictional characters ===
- Blitzkrieg (Marvel Comics), a superhero from Marvel Comics
- Blitzkrieg (DC Comics), a supervillain from DC Comics
- Baron Blitzkrieg, a supervillain and ancestor of Blitzkrieg in DC Comics
- Blitzkrieg Boys, the Russian team in the anime series Beyblade, known as the Demolition Boys in the show's first season
- Team Blitzkrieg, the German team in the film DodgeBall: A True Underdog Story (2004)

=== Games ===
- Blitzkrieg (video game series), a series of World War II computer games
  - Blitzkrieg (video game), a 2003 real-time tactics computer game
- Blitzkrieg (board game), a tabletop wargame published by Avalon Hill in 1965
- Scholar's mate, a chess beginner's blunder

=== Literature ===
- Blitzkrieg: From the Rise of Hitler to the Fall of Dunkirk, a book by Len Deighton and a computer game published by Ariolasoft in 1987
- Blitzkrieg (comic book), a comic book series

=== Music ===
==== Bands ====
- Blitzkrieg (metal band), an English heavy metal band
- Blitzkrieg (punk band), an English punk rock band
- Blitzkrieg, former name of the German band Wallenstein and the name of their first album
- Blitzkrieg, former name of the Swedish band Therion
- Blitzkrieg, former name of the German band Boskops

==== Songs ====
- "Blitzkrieg", a 1981 song by English metal band Blitzkrieg, later covered by Metallica on Garage Inc.
- "Blitzkrieg Bop", a 1976 song by the punk rock band Ramones
- "Blitzkrieg" (song), a 1993 song by Excessive Force
- "Blitzkrieg", a song by Deathstars from their 2006 album Termination Bliss

== Other uses ==
- The "Blitzkrieg", or "Overkill" hypothesis of the New World Pleistocene extinctions

== See also ==
- Blitz campaign
- Blitz (disambiguation)
- Krieg (disambiguation)
