= Blitz (surname) =

Blitz is the surname of:

- Andy Blitz (born 1971), writer, actor and comedian
- Anne Dudley Blitz (1881–1951), Dean of Women at the University of Minnesota (1923–1949)
- David Blitz, philosopher
- Gérard Blitz (entrepreneur) (1912–1990), founder of Club Med
- Gérard Blitz (swimmer) (1901–1979), swimming and waterpolo Olympic medalist
- Jeffrey Blitz, American film director and screenwriter
- Jekuthiel Blitz, translator of Bible into Yiddish 1678
- Johnny Blitz, punk rock drummer
- Julien Paul Blitz (1885–1951), Belgian-American conductor
- Maurice Blitz (1891–1975), Belgian Olympic water polo player
- Phil Blitz (born 1984), professional wrestler
- Rayner Blitz (born 1968), cricketer
- Simon Blitz, British entrepreneur
- Urban Blitz (born 1951), British rock musician
