= Blitzen =

Blitzen may refer to:

- Blitzen, one of Santa Claus' reindeer, as named in "The Night Before Christmas"
- Blitzen (computer), an SIMD (single instruction, multiple data) computer system
- Blitzen, a superhero from multiple Milestone Media comic books
- Blitzen, Oregon, a ghost town
- Blitzen, a dwarf in Magnus Chase and the Gods of Asgard

== See also ==
- Blitz (disambiguation)
- Blitzkrieg
