= Blitzer =

Blitzer may refer to:

== People ==
- Barry Blitzer (1929–2010), American television writer
- David Blitzer (born 1969), American investor and sports team owner
- David M. Blitzer (born 1948), American economist
- Wolf Blitzer (born 1948), American journalist

== Other uses ==
- Blitzers, a South Korean boy band

== See also ==
- Harris Blitzer Sports & Entertainment, U.S. company
- Blitzerman, a fictional character from Disney's The Incredibles
- Blitzar, a kind of pulsar that will become a black hole if it stops spinning
- Blitz (disambiguation)
