= Bible translations into Yiddish =

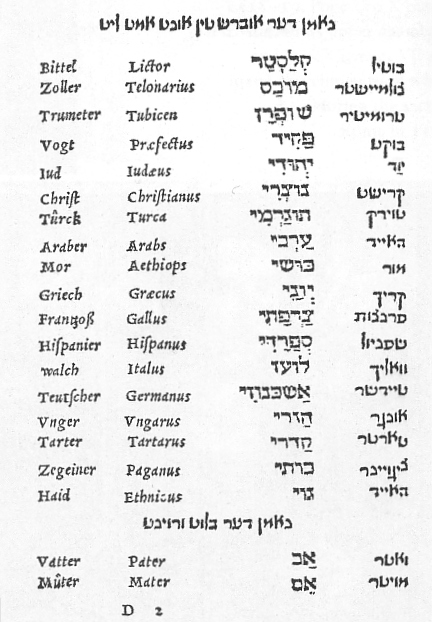
A Yiddish-Hebrew-Latin-German dictionary by Elijah Levita, 1544

In the early part of the sixteenth century, there were already attempts to translate the Bible into Yiddish, including Hebrew-Yiddish biblical dictionaries. One of the most authoritative was the Bible that Jekuthiel Blitz translated in 1678.

== Translations ==
There are numerous Biblical translations in Yiddish because it constituted the very beginning of its literature along with other the religious texts such as the Talmud. Scholars explained that this can be attributed to the fact that the Bible is a popular book among the Jewish communities in Germany and surrounding European countries and it was also a reference for the early education of young Jews there.

There were different translation style such as the so-called Ashkenazi literary tradition, more popularly known as taytsh-khumesh, which translated the Bible literally. Here, the words in the Hebrew original were translated into their Yiddish counterparts. While this method was widely criticized, mainly for its strict adherence to the literal meaning of the text, it proved useful particularly for theologians and Hebraists who needed sources in their effort to understand of the literal sense of the Bible.

Jekuthiel Blitz, who was a rabbi from Wittmund, Germany, published his work with the backing financial backers such as Aharon Hart, who obtained haskomes for the undertaking from the Council of the Four Lands, the central governing body of Polish Jews.

A notable milestone in the historical development of the Yiddish Bible involved Solomon Bloomgarden's initiative. His translation is considered to be the most comprehensive and was published under his pen name Yehoesh. The text is regarded as both literary and scholarly, influenced the work of Yiddish scholars in the nineteenth century.

== Glossaries and dictionaries ==
- The Mirkeves hamishne, also known as Seyfer shel reb Anshl, was a Hebrew-Yiddish glossary of the Torah (printed in Kraków, c. 1534).
- Elijah Levita made a Hebrew-Yiddish dictionary of the Pentateuch, the Five Megillot, and Haftarot (Konstanz, 1544).

== Biblical texts ==
- The Hebrew Bible was first translated by Jekuthiel Blitz (Amsterdam, 1678), revised by Joseph Witzenhausen.
- Hayyim ben Nathan published the Apocrypha in Yiddish with the Hebrew title Sefer Ha Maasim in 1625.
- The New Testament was first translated by Benjamin Nehemiah Solomon, (London 1821).
