= Who Gets the Last Laugh? =

Who gets the Last Laugh? may refer to:

- Who Gets the Last Laugh?, a 2013 television series on TBS.
- An episode of the television show One Piece.
