= Benjamin Nehemiah Solomon =

Benjamin Nehemiah Solomon (born c. 1790 in Poland) was the first translator of the New Testament into Yiddish, published by the London Jews Society in 1821. Solomon was a Polish-Jewish convert to Christianity who had moved to England. The Hebrew Bible itself had already been translated into Yiddish by Jekuthiel Blitz of Wittmund and printed in Amsterdam in 1679.
