= Blit =

Blit may refer to:

- Bachelor of Literature (BLit), an undergraduate academic degree conferred in China
- Bit blit (BITBLT), a computer operation in which two bitmap patterns are combined
- Blit (computer terminal), a programmable bitmap graphics terminal
- Band-limited impulse train (BLIT) synthesis
- "BLIT" (short story), by David Langford
- The Blit dialect of the Cotabato Manobo language
- Toyota Mark II Blit, a car

== See also ==
- Blits (disambiguation)
