= Blitz defence =

Defensive technique used in sports

The Blitz defence is a defensive method used in sports including American Football and rugby union.

== Rugby union ==
=== Origins ===
Internationally, first credited to South Africa, used in the 1995 World Cup.Warren Gatland did explicitly credit the 1995 Springboks as the pioneers of the blitz defence.

=== Method ===
In a blitz defence the whole defensive line moves forward towards their markedman as one as soon as the ball leaves the base of a ruck or maul. The charge is usually led by the inside centre.

The idea of this technique is to prevent the attacking team gaining any ground by tackling them behind the gain line and forcing interceptions and charged-down kicks. However, the defending team can be vulnerable to chip kicks and any player breaking the defensive line will have much space to play because the defence are running the other way and must stop, turn and chase.

=== Historical record ===
When South Africa won the 1995 Rugby World Cup, their defence coach was Kitch Christie (who was also the head coach), and they utilized a terrifyingly fast, aggressive rush defence that completely rattled opponents—most famously shutting down Jonah Lomu and the All Blacks in the final.

The blitz defence paid dividends for London Wasps with the team winning the Heineken Cup in 2003-04 and 2006–07, the Premiership title in 2003, 2004, 2005 and 2008 and the Anglo-Welsh Cup in 2006. Not only this, but this style of defence played a significant role in the 2008 Six Nations Grand Slam for the Welsh national team, who conceded only two tries over five games.

== American football ==
The term blitz defence is a defensive play in American Football, where the defence players (usually Linebackers) pile forward against the offensive line en masse in the hope of tackling the Quarterback while he is still in possession of the ball.
