= Blits =

Blits or BLITS may refer to:

- BLITS, a Russian satellite launched in 2009
- Black & Lane's Ident Tones for Surround
- Jan Blits (born 1943), American educational researcher

== See also ==
- Blit (disambiguation)
- Blitz (disambiguation)
- Blists Hill Victorian Town
