= Canyon Bomber =

1977 video game

- Arcade flyer
- Developer: Atari, Inc.
- Publishers: Atari, Inc.
- Designer: Wendi Allen
- Programmers: Arcade; Wendi Allen; 2600; David Crane
- Platforms: Arcade, Atari 2600
- Release: Arcade: NA: November 1977; 2600: April 1979
- Genre: Action
- Modes: Single-player, multiplayer

Canyon Bomber is a 1977 action video game developed and published by Atari, Inc. for arcades. It was programmed by Wendi Allen (credited as Howard Delman), who previously worked on Super Bug for Atari. Canyon Bomber was ported to the Atari VCS in 1979.

== Gameplay ==
Atari VCS screenshot

The player and an opponent fly a blimp or biplane over a canyon full of numbered, circular rocks, arranged in layers. The player does not control the flight of vehicles, but only presses a single button to drop a bomb which destroys rocks and gives points. Each rock is labeled with the points given for destroying it. As the number of rocks is reduced, it becomes harder to hit them without missing. The third time a player drops a bomb without hitting a rock, the game is over.

== Development ==
To create Canyon Bomber, Allen modified a Sprint 2 board which she then programmed. The first version of the game required 3K of ROM. As ROMs were expensive at the time, Allen’s supervisor requested that she fit the game into 2K, which she did.

== Ports ==
An Atari 2600 port was developed by then-Atari employee David Crane. It uses solid bricks rather than round rocks. Instead of visible point values, each layer of bricks has a color corresponding to its worth. It also includes Sea Bomber game modes where players destroy ships instead of rocks.

== Legacy ==
The 1981 VIC-20 game Blitz was inspired by a description of Canyon Bomber and used buildings as the targets instead of rocks. That change inspired many subsequent Blitz clones for different systems.

Canyon Bomber was re-released as part of Atari Collection 1 for the Evercade in 2020 and Atari 50 in 2022 for multiple consoles.

== See also ==
- List of Atari 2600 games
