= David Blitz =

American mathematician

- Born: Montreal, Quebec, Canada

Philosophical work
- Era: 20th-century philosophy
- Region: Western philosophy
- School: Analytic Philosophy
- Main interests: Philosophy of science, logic, ethics, mathematics

David Blitz has been a faculty member at Central Connecticut State University since 1989. His areas of teaching and research are the history and philosophy of science, with special interest in theories of evolution and modern logic, as well as the work of Charles Darwin and Bertrand Russell. His book, Emergent Evolution: Qualitative Novelty and the Levels of Reality was published in 1992 by Kluwer Academic Publishers. He is currently working on a monograph on Bertrand Russell's Philosophy of War and Peace. David Blitz is also active in the Honors program and Peace Studies program.
