= Rayner Blitz =

English cricketer

Personal information
- Full name: Rayner John Blitz
- Born: 25 March 1968 (age 58); Watford, Hertfordshire, England
- Batting: Right-handed
- Role: Wicket-keeper

Domestic team information
- Years: Team
- 1986: Somerset

Career statistics
Competition	First-class	List A
Matches	5	2
Runs scored	33	1
Batting average	6.60	1.00
100s/50s	0/0	0/0
Top score	18	1
Catches/stumpings	8/0	1/0
- Source: CricketArchive, 13 December 2013

Rayner John Blitz (born 25 March 1968 at Watford, Hertfordshire), was a cricketer who played five first-class matches and one List A match for Somerset in 1986.

A diminutive wicketkeeper and right-handed batsman who had played for Essex's second eleven in 1985, Blitz was signed to cover for an injury to Trevor Gard, Somerset's regular wicketkeeper. He took eight catches in his five games and played for Somerset's second eleven across the summer. But the county was looking for a wicketkeeper who could make reliable runs as the long-term successor to Gard, and signed Neil Burns from Essex for the 1987 season. Blitz was released by Somerset at the end of the 1986 season.

Blitz did not play first-class cricket again, though he played for Derbyshire's second eleven and for Dorset in the Minor Counties.
