= Boskops =

Punk band from Hannover, Germany

Boskops are a German punk band from Hannover. They were formerly named Blitzkrieg.
