= David M. Blitzer =

American economist (born 1948)

- Born: November 1, 1948 (age 77)
- Known for: Former chairman of S&P Dow Jones Indices

David M. Blitzer (born November 1, 1948) is the former chairman of S&P Dow Jones Indices, where he was head of the index committee that determines which stocks are added to the S&P 500 Index, the Dow Jones Industrial Average, and all other stock market indices calculated by the company. He held overall responsibility for index security selection, as well as index analysis and management until retiring in 2019.

== Early life and education ==
Blitzer received a B.S. in engineering from Cornell University, an M.A. in economics from George Washington University, and a Ph.D. in economics from Columbia University.

== Career ==
Blitzer served as chief economist at The McGraw-Hill Companies and equity analyst at S&P Capital IQ Equity Research and S&P Credit Research. Prior to that, he was a senior economic analyst with National Economic Research Associates, Inc. and did consulting work for various government and private sector agencies, including the New Jersey Department of Environmental Protection, the National Commission on Materials Policy, and Natural Resources Defense Council.

In 1989, he joined the index committee and he became its chairman in 1995.

In 2000, Blitzer was ranked 7th on SmartMoney’s list of the 30 most influential people in the world of investing. Blitzer retired in August 2019.

=== Books ===
Blitzer has written two books, What’s the Economy Trying to Tell You? Everyone’s Guide to Understanding and Profiting from the Economy (1997) and Outpacing the Pros: Using Indices to Beat Wall Street’s Savviest Money Managers (2001).
