= Krieg =

Krieg (German: "war") may refer to:

== Arts and entertainment ==
=== Fictional characters ===
- Krieg (character), a fictional character from the Borderlands video game series
- Don Krieg, a character from the One Piece manga series
- Simon Gruber, or Peter Krieg, a character from Die Hard with a Vengeance
- Death Korps of Krieg, an Imperial Guard regiment in the Warhammer 40,000 fictional universe

=== Music ===
- Krieg (album), an album by KMFDM
- Krieg (band), an American black metal band
- "Krieg" (song), a song by Farin Urlaub Racing Team

== Other uses ==
- Krieg (surname)
