= Blitzen (computer) =

SIMD Computer System

Blitzen was a miniaturized SIMD (single instruction, multiple data) computer system designed for NASA in the late 1980s by a team of researchers at Duke University, North Carolina State University and the Microelectronics Center of North Carolina. Blitzen was composed of a control unit and an array of single-bit processors connected in a grid topology. The machine influenced, to some extent, the design of the MasPar MP-1 computer.

Potential applications of the Blitzen machine include high-speed image processing, where each processor operates on a pixel of the input image and communicates with its grid neighbors to apply image processing filters on the image.
