= Blitz (video game) =

1981 video game

- Publishers: TaySoft (Vic New York); Commodore (Blitz, Super Blitz); Mastertronic (New York Blitz)
- Designer: Simon Taylor
- Platforms: VIC-20, Commodore 16, Commodore 64 (Super Blitz)
- Release: 1981
- Genre: Action

Blitz is an action game published by Commodore for its VIC-20 home computer in 1981. The game is based on the 1977 arcade video game Canyon Bomber from Atari, Inc., with the goal of clearing boulders replaced with bombing closely packed skyscrapers. Several later clones of the concept also use the urban setting. The game is played with a single button which drops a bomb.

Taylor originally self-published the game as Vic New York. Blitz was later sold by Mastertronic as New York Blitz. He ported Blitz to the Commodore 16 and, as Super Blitz, the Commodore 64.

== Gameplay ==
A plane flies across a single-screen cityscape at a steady speed. When it reaches the edge of the screen, it wraps to the other side at a lower altitude, with its speed increasing each pass. The player drops bombs from the plane, and each bomb removes one or more segments of the structure it hits. As the plane descends, it risks colliding with remaining buildings. The level is complete when all buildings are destroyed, and the plane has descended safely to the bottom of the screen.

== Development ==
The game was prompted by a verbal description of Canyon Bomber, originally released as an arcade video game by Atari, Inc. in 1977 and ported to the Atari VCS. The change from a canyon filled with rock pillars to a city of skyscrapers was copied by later clones including Blitz (ZX Spectrum), City Bomber (C64), and City Lander (ZX81).

Simon Taylor wrote the game as Vic New York before he contracted with Commodore in 1982. Taylor later produced versions for the Commodore 64, Commodore 16, and Epson HX-20 portable computer. Commodore published the C64 version as Super Blitz.

== Legacy ==
Mastertronic later sold the game as the budget-priced New York Blitz.

Jeff Minter wrote a 1982 ZX Spectrum game inspired by Blitz called Bomber (also published as City Bomber).
