= Gain line =

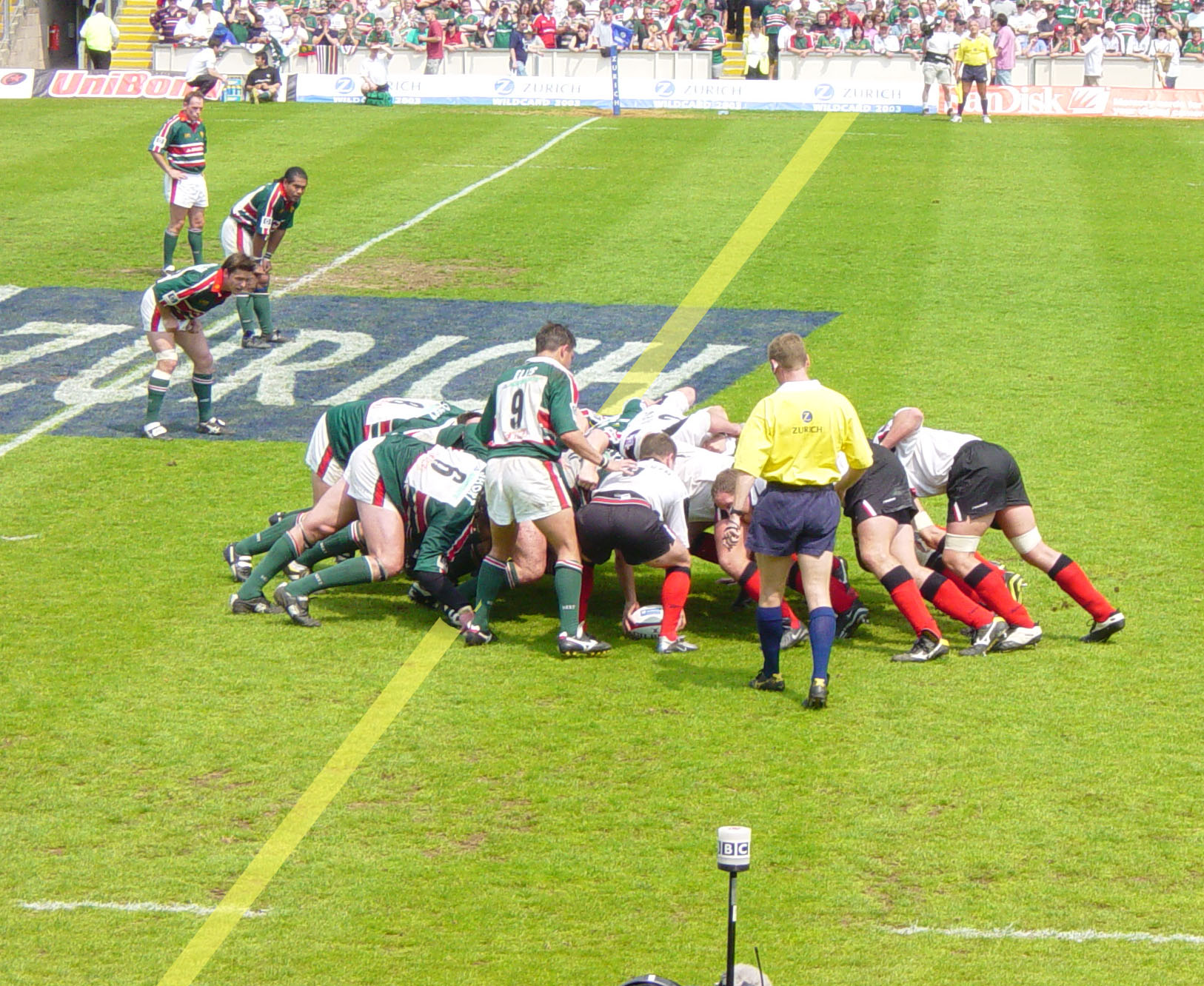
Scrum with gain line added electronically in yellow

The gain line, in rugby union, is an imaginary line (parallel to the halfway line) drawn across the pitch at the point where there is a breakdown in open play, such as a ruck, maul or scrum. Advancing across the gain line represents a gain in territory. Playing "beyond the gain line" is a common phrase coaches use to teach their players the fundamental goal of rugby (gaining space while maintaining possession of the ball).
