= SMS Blitz =

Two ships of the German Kaiserliche Marine (Imperial Navy) and one of the Austro-Hungarian Navy have been named SMS Blitz:

- SMS Blitz (1862), a German gunboat launched in 1862
- SMS Blitz (1882), a German aviso launched in 1882
- SMS Blitz (1888), an Austro-Hungarian torpedo gunboat launched in 1888
