= BlitzMail =

Internal e-mail network at Dartmouth College

BlitzMail was an e-mail system used at Dartmouth College in Hanover, New Hampshire, United States. It was one of the earliest e-mail server/client packages. Use of BlitzMail ended in 2011, in favor of a Microsoft suite of email/online collaboration programs, but students still use the term "blitz" rather than "email."

== History ==
BlitzMail was developed by Dartmouth in 1987 and went live in the summer of 1988. The name BlitzMail started as a joke among its programmers, as it had to be developed quickly.

In 1991, when Dartmouth required every student to own a computer, the server code was updated to allow multiple servers to accommodate the heavy demand for the system. In 1993, the server was rewritten to support mail folders. In 1994, the client and server software was released for use outside of Dartmouth. Some non-Dartmouth BlitzMail deployments include Valley.Net, an internet service provider in New England's Upper Valley region and, from 1991 to 2005, Reed College in Portland, Oregon.

The first versions of the client ran only on the Apple Macintosh operating system. The client was ported to Windows around the time of Windows 3.1.

Dartmouth's Computing Services rolled out an updated BlitzMail client for Mac OS X that featured encrypted client-server communications. Developed in May 2006 by computer science doctoral candidate Chris Masone, the software became available in late 2007. Version 2.9 for Mac OS X 10.3 was available beginning in October 2008.

Recent releases of the client have experimental support for rendering (but not composing) HTML-based messages.

A project at Dartmouth-Hitchcock Medical Center continued to use the Windows BlitzMail service, which was no longer being developed or supported. Dartmouth-Hitchcock Medical Center BlitzMail servers were scheduled to be deactivated on October 1, 2012. A Microsoft suite developed by email/online program collaborators was released to fill in its role.

== Dartmouth College ==
BlitzMail became the primary means of communication of all types on the Dartmouth College campus, between students, professors, and administrators. Hundreds of public terminals were located around campus, in libraries, dining halls, and academic buildings. In the mid-1990s, Mac Classic public terminals were commonly referred to as "Blitzcheckers." Additionally, "blitz" became used as a noun and verb, used the same way "email" might be. While BlitzMail is no longer used, students as of 2020 still use "blitz" instead of "email."

Until the mid-2000s, largely due to poor cellular reception on campus, many students opted to use BlitzMail rather than cellular phones, but this trend decreased as service improved on campus. In 2006, students began checking blitz on their cell phones.

== Client ==
The BlitzMail client was graphical, and ran on Windows and Macintosh computers. Several Java implementations exist, as well as web-based clients, such as NetBlitz and WebBlitz. The client has not had major updates since the late 1990s, with the exception of a port to Mac OS X. The client does not officially support HTML-based e-mail, dealing only in plaintext. (HTML files are viewed as attachments.) There is unofficial support to allow HTML-based email to be opened within the client normally.

The program is portable for users. A user's mailbox, address book, and preferences are all stored on the server. Any user can log into any installation of the client and have full access to their data. After a user logs out, no data or personalization is stored on the local machine. This feature allows the use of the many public terminals.

BlitzMail also acted as a pseudo-instant messaging client. Messages were processed by the server and delivered to the recipient almost immediately.

The program was integrated with the Dartmouth Name Directory (DND), allowing users to message any recipient with a Dartmouth email address by searching for their name.

== Technical specifications ==
BlitzMail speaks its own protocol between client and server, meaning that only the BlitzMail client can utilize the full feature-set of the server.

Messages entering and leaving the BlitzMail domain are handled via Simple Mail Transfer Protocol (SMTP). As of 2004, patches were available that allowed clients to connect to a BlitzMail server via POP3 and IMAP (with SSL.) The client communicates to the server on TCP ports 2151 and 1119 and the notification service runs on UDP port 2154.

In 2002, SpamAssassin functionality was added to BlitzMail. The DND server was also modified to allow LDAP lookups.

The BlitzMail and DND servers run on DEC Unix and many Linux flavors. The OS must support POSIX threading or Mach kernel-style cthreads. The server will run on systems with very low hardware requirements.

The BlitzMail servers have run on a variety of hardware at Dartmouth. In the early 1990s, the mail and DND servers ran on 25 MHz NeXT cubes named after Santa Claus' reindeer. At the time, hundreds of sessions could be handled on each machine. Later, the servers were migrated to DEC 3000 AXP Model 300s.

A Python library implementation called PyBlitz was released in 2006 by Michael Fromberger.

The BlitzMail client and server software were available under an BSD-style (with ad clause) license.
