= Jekuthiel Blitz =

Jekuthiel ben Isaac Blitz (b. Wittmund, Germany, fl. 1670s) was a rabbi who made the first whole translation of the Hebrew Bible into Yiddish.

Blitz was a corrector of the press in the Hebrew printing-office of Uri Phoebus (Faibush) Halevi in Amsterdam and was commissioned by him to make a translation which finished printing in late 1678.

The translation which was the first of its kind of the entire Old Testament has three introductions; one in Hebrew and one in German written by Blitz and the third in Judæo-German by the printer together with letters patent of the king of Poland Johann III Sobieski and approbations by various rabbis. Blitz also translated into Judæo-German Levi ben Gerson's "To'aliyyot" on Joshua, Judges, and Samuel, published together with the preceding work.

Since Blitz was not an accomplished Hebraist he relied on other translations into Germanic languages, Luther's German translation and the Dutch Statenvertaling.
