= One Piece season 1 =

One Piece
- Season 1 East Blue
- The Eternal Log home media cover art for East Blue, which released on January 22, 2021
- No. of episodes: 61

Release
- Original network: Fuji Television
- Original release: October 20, 1999 – March 7, 2001

Season chronology
- Next → Season 2

The first season of the One Piece anime television series aired on Fuji Television from October 20, 1999, through March 7, 2001, totaling 61 episodes. Produced by Toei Animation and directed by Kounosuke Uda, it adapts the first twelve volumes of the manga by Eiichiro Oda. The first season depicts the exploits of the pirate captain Monkey D. Luffy as he gathers his crew at the East Blue and prepares to head to the Grand Line, all while defeating dangerous local captain pirates at the East Blue in their path as Luffy gains his infamy as "Straw Hat" Luffy. The last 8 episodes, set on Warship Island, are the first anime-original filler material in the series.

In 2004, 4Kids Entertainment licensed the series for a heavily edited English dubbed broadcast. 4Kids edited the episodes for content, merged one episode and left out 18 episodes, thus reducing the season's episode count to a total of 53 episodes. The series made its U.S. premiere on September 18, 2004, on Fox as part of its FoxBox TV programming block, lasting until July 30, 2005. Funimation Entertainment later licensed the series and released the first season in four unedited and uncut, bilingual-language compilations; the first was released on May 27, 2008, and the last was released on March 31, 2009.

The season uses four pieces of theme music: two opening themes and two ending themes. The first opening theme is the award-winning title "We Are!" (ウィーアー!, Wī Ā!), performed by Hiroshi Kitadani in Japanese and Vic Mignogna in English (Funimation dub; Russell Velazquez initially performed the English version for the 4Kids dub before replacing it with the "Pirate Rap") for the first 47 episodes. The second opening, which was used for the rest of the season, is "Believe" by Folder5 in Japanese and Meredith McCoy in English. The first ending theme, titled "Memories" for the first 30 episodes, and was performed by Maki Otsuki in Japanese and Brina Palencia in English, who also performed the second ending theme song, titled "Run! Run! Run!" in Japanese, for the rest of the season. Caitlin Glass performed the English version of the second ending theme. 4Kids used original music in their adaptation, while Funimation opted for English-language versions of the theme music pieces.

== Episodes ==
Orig.	4Kids	No. in season	4Kids title Original Japanese & Funimation titles	Directed by	Written by	Animation directed by	Original release date	English air date	Rank Rating (Note: Rank of the episode in Video Research's weekly, household-rating-based ranking of anime shows. The figures of the rank and rating column are taken from the same sources as the respective episode's original airdate.)
Romance Dawn
1	1	1	"I'm Gonna Be King of the Pirates!" "I'm Luffy! The Man Who's Gonna Be King of the Pirates!"; Transliteration: "Ore wa Rufi! Kaizoku Ō ni Naru Otoko Da!" (Japanese: 俺はルフィ!海賊王になる男だ!)	Kōnosuke Uda	Junki Takegami	Kazuya Hisada	October 20, 1999	September 18, 2004	6; 12.4
In the ocean, Alvida and her pirate crew attack a cruise ship. Coby, a slave of Alvida, discovers a barrel. One of Alvida's pirates attempts to open the barrel, but a young boy emerges and accidentally hits him. The remaining pirates attack him, but the stranger stops them and says that his name is Monkey D. Luffy. Luffy drags Coby to the storage cellar of the ship, where he eats and converses with Coby, who reveals his dream of being a marine as Luffy reveals his dream to become the King of the Pirates, much to Coby's shock. Alvida confronts Luffy, but he escapes and knocks her pirate crew down with his Devil Fruit power, much to Coby's shock again. Luffy explains that he ate the Gum-Gum Fruit, therefore he has the properties of rubber. Coby, inspired by Luffy, stands up for himself when Alvida confronts them. Luffy uses his Gum-Gum Pistol technique on Alvida, defeating her and sending her flying into the ocean. Luffy and Coby sail away in a "borrowed" boat from Alvida's crew. Luffy asks about the bounty hunter that Coby mentioned earlier. Coby says that he was captured by the Marines, and Luffy announces his intention of asking him to join his crew, much to Coby's worry.
2	2	2	"Roronoa Zoro: Pirate Hunter" "Enter the Great Swordsman! Pirate Hunter Roronoa Zoro!"; Transliteration: "Daikengō Arawaru! Kaizokugari Roronoa Zoro" (Japanese: 大剣豪現る!海賊狩りロロノア·ゾロ)	Tetsuji Nakamura	Michiru Shimada	Eisaku Inoue	November 17, 1999	September 25, 2004	9; 11.7
Luffy and Coby arrive at a place with a large Marine base, where Luffy discovers the great swordsman and bounty hunter Roronoa Zoro tied to a pole. Rika, a young girl, offers Zoro some rice balls that she made herself. Helmeppo, the son of Marine captain "Axe-Hand" Morgan, discovers this and has Rika thrown out. Luffy asks Zoro to join his crew, but Zoro refuses and has Luffy give him the rice balls. Luffy and Coby meet Rika in town, who is happy to hear that Zoro enjoyed the rice balls. She tells them how Helmeppo brought his vicious pet dog into their bar and that Zoro knocked it out to protect everyone inside. He then made a deal with Helmeppo: if he can survive being tied to a pole with no food or water for thirty days, then Helmeppo will spare the little girl and her mother. However, Helmeppo says that he will execute Zoro the next day despite his word. Luffy punches him and Helmeppo runs off to tell his father. While Luffy invades the Navy base to find Zoro's swords, Coby attempts to untie Zoro and explains the situation to him. Morgan orders that they are both to be executed. The soldiers open fire, but before the bullets can reach them, Luffy leaps from the base and uses his rubber body to block the bullets.
3	3	3	"An Unlikely Pair: The Pirate & the Pirate Hunter" "Morgan vs. Luffy! Who's the Mysterious Pretty Girl?"; Transliteration: "Mōgan tai Rufi! Nazo no Bishōjo wa Dare?" (Japanese: モーガンVSルフィ!謎の美少女は誰?)	Hidehiko Kadota	Michiru Shimada	Kenji Yokoyama	November 24, 1999	October 2, 2004	7; 13.3
Luffy hands the three swords to Zoro in exchange for Zoro joining his crew. Luffy and Morgan engage in battle. All of Morgan's attacks miss and Luffy knocks Morgan to the ground. However, Helmeppo takes Coby hostage. But Coby declares that he will not stand in the way of Luffy's dream even if it means death. Luffy strikes Helmeppo, while Zoro takes out Morgan right before he can kill Luffy. As Morgan collapses, the Marines toss their weapons into the air in celebration of their corrupt captain's defeat. Later, Luffy, Zoro, and Coby are in the town restaurant with Rika and her mom. Marines step into the restaurant, and as Luffy and Zoro are pirates, they must leave the island immediately. Luffy and Zoro get ready to go, and the head of the Marines asks if Coby is with them. Luffy goes on to explain that Coby spent time aboard Alvida's pirate ship as her slave, and this makes Coby angry as it will ruin his chances of enrolling in the Marines. Coby punches Luffy, in response Luffy beats Coby to near death. The Marines see Coby is not with them and so order Luffy and Zoro to leave. As they do, Coby asks to join the Marines and is accepted. Outside, Luffy and Zoro climb into their boat and as they set sail, the Marines salute them for saving the town, including Coby. Coby vows to meet Luffy again, as a Marine meeting a pirate.
4	4	4	"The Passing Of The Hat" "Luffy's Past! Enter Red-Haired Shanks!"; Transliteration: "Rufi no Kako! Akagami no Shankusu Tōjō" (Japanese: ルフィの過去!赤髪のシャンクス登場)	Munehisa Sakai	Junki Takegami	Masayuki Takagi	December 8, 1999	October 9, 2004	9; 12.9
In a flashback, a seven-year-old young Luffy sits in a bar filled with the pirate crew of the "Red-Haired" Shanks, begging him to take him out to sea. But the pirate captain laughs and refuses. A bandit named Higuma enters and orders several barrels of booze. Shanks offers him the last bottle but Higuma smashes it and humiliates Shanks. After the bandit leaves the bar, all of the pirates start to laugh. Luffy is angered by the crew's laughs and Shanks' passivity, and in a huff, eats a purple fruit lying on the bar. Shanks notices and tries to make Luffy spit it out, but it is too late. An enraged Shanks tells Luffy that he just ate the Gum-Gum Fruit, a Devil Fruit, and now he is a rubber human who won't be able to ever swim again. Later, Luffy gets attacked by Higuma and his bandits. He is about to be killed, when Shanks and his crew arrive and effortlessly defeat Higuma's men. Frightened, Higuma throws down a smoke bomb and makes his escape, taking Luffy with him. He flees out to sea in a boat. As he throws Luffy into the water and laughs at his plight, a Sea King appears behind him and devours him whole. The sea monster then goes for Luffy, but Shanks stops the sea monster as it takes a bite, and with one look, drives the beast away. Luffy clutches Shanks and starts crying, since Shanks' arm was bitten off by the creature. Shanks replies that it is fine, as long as Luffy is safe. As the pirates get ready to leave, Luffy decides he will become a pirate on his own, that he will gather a own crew that will beat Shanks' crew, and that he will become King of the Pirates. Shanks gives his straw hat to Luffy and promises him to return it some day, as a great pirate. Back in the present, Luffy slingshots into the sky to catch a bird. Instead he is caught himself. Zoro, now alone in their boat, tries to keep up, paddling. On his way he picks up three castaways from Buggy the Clown's crew. The bird, carrying Luffy, flies over a town, where it is shot down by Buggy's men. Luffy falls and lands right in front of Nami, who is running away from Buggy's crew after stealing their precious map to the Grand Line.
Orange Town
5	5	5	"The Circus Comes To Town" "A Terrifying Mysterious Power! Captain Buggy, the Clown Pirate!"; Transliteration: "Kyōfu Nazo no Chikara! Kaizoku Dōke Bagī-senchō!" (Japanese: 恐怖!謎の力·海賊道化バギー船長!)	Jun'ichi Fujise	Junki Takegami	Yūji Hakamada	December 15, 1999	October 16, 2004	8; 13.5
Nami pretends that Luffy is her boss, using the distraction to escape from Buggy's men. After Luffy beats them, she asks him to join her. Then Luffy finds out that she is a navigator, and asks her to join his crew of pirates. But as she hates pirates, she refuses. Then she tricks Luffy into letting himself be tied up and brought to Buggy, where he is locked up in a small cage, while Nami fakes joining Buggy's crew. As proof of loyalty, Buggy demands that Nami kill Luffy, but she cannot bring herself to do it. As Buggy's pirates attack her, Zoro arrives to save his captain and her. Buggy recognizes Zoro as the Pirate Hunter and attacks him. Zoro cuts Buggy into pieces. Believing Buggy to be dead, he sheaths his swords and is stabbed in the back by Buggy, who reveals he ate the Chop-Chop Fruit and can separate his body and is impervious to being cut. The wound puts Zoro at a disadvantage. He picks up the cage with Luffy inside and the three escape.
6	6	6	"The Beast Breaker" "Desperate Situation! Beast Tamer Mohji vs. Luffy!"; Transliteration: "Zettai Zetsumei! Mōjūtsukai Mōji tai Rufi!" (Japanese: 絶体絶命!猛獣使いモージvsルフィ!)	Shigeyasu Yamauchi	Mitsuru Shimada	Takeo Ide	December 29, 1999	October 23, 2004	1; 12.3
Still trapped in the cage, Luffy meets a small dog named Chouchou guarding his master's store, despite knowing that his owner is dead. The Beast Tamer Mohji's lion, Ritchie, inadvertently breaks Luffy's cage open and sends him flying. Chouchou tries to protect the store, but is no match for the much stronger Ritchie and Mohji burns the store down. Angered by Mohji destroying what the dog finds precious, Luffy mercilessly punches him out. Moved by Luffy's concern for the dog, Nami agrees to work with Luffy for the time being.
7	7	7	"The Desperate Duel" "Epic Showdown! Swordsman Zoro vs. Acrobat Cabaji!"; Transliteration: "Sōzetsu Kettō! Kengō Zoro tai Kyokugei no Kabaji!" (Japanese: 壮絶決闘!剣豪ゾロvs曲芸のカバジ!)	Tetsuji Nakamura	Mitsuru Shimada	Kazuya Hisada	December 29, 1999	October 30, 2004	1; 12.3
Enraged by the actions of Buggy's crew, the city's Mayor Boodle rushes to fight Buggy himself, but the Straw Hat Pirates come to his rescue, Luffy knocking him out to prevent him from getting himself killed. Zoro fights the Acrobat Cabaji, despite still being wounded from his previous encounter with Buggy, and defeats him. Nami leaves to search for the map to the Grand Line. Luffy begins fighting Buggy, who knows that he can injure Luffy's rubber body by cutting him and enrages him by damaging his straw hat.
8	8	8	"Who Gets the Last Laugh?" "Who Is the Victor? Devil Fruit Power Showdown!"; Transliteration: "Shōsha wa Dotchi? Akuma no Mi no Nōryoku Taiketsu!" (Japanese: 勝者はどっち?悪魔の実の能力対決!)	Kōnosuke Uda	Michiru Shimada	Kenji Yokoyama	December 29, 1999	November 6, 2004	1; 12.3
Buggy reveals that Shanks accidentally caused him to eat the Chop-Chop Fruit he had been planning to sell while they were apprentice pirates on the same ship, preventing him from finding an underwater treasure. Nami manages to steal Buggy's body parts and Luffy sends him flying with Gum-Gum Bazooka. Luffy, Nami and Zoro are forced to flee town as the villagers discover that Luffy knocked out Boodle and that Luffy is a pirate, but Boodle is thankful with the three.
Syrup Village
9	9	9	"The Teller of Tales" "The Honorable Liar? Captain Usopp!"; Transliteration: "Seigi no Usotsuki? Kyaputen Usoppu" (Japanese: 正義のうそつき?キャプテンウソップ)	Hidehiko Kadota	Junki Takegami	Eisaku Inoue	January 12, 2000	November 13, 2004	8; 11.4
When Luffy, Zoro, and Nami land on another island, Usopp appears to greet them, with three children hiding in the bushes. After a failed attempt on Usopp's part to scare the pirates away, they talk about Shanks and his marksman Yasopp, Usopp's father. Usopp brings them to a restaurant, where after a meal, he leaves them to head for a mansion outside town. The mansion belongs to Kaya, a sickly young woman. She and Klahadore, her butler, talk about Usopp and Klahadore forbids her to see him. Usopp comes anyway and he tells Kaya a story about fighting a giant goldfish with droppings the size of islands. Back at the restaurant, Usopp's small friends, the Usopp Pirates enter in search of their captain. They bring Luffy, Zoro, and Nami to Kaya's mansion, and tell them how Usopp tells Kaya lies to cheer her up since her parents died and she became ill. Luffy decides they should ask her for a ship and as there are bodyguards guarding the gate, he slingshots the whole group over the fence. They crash into the ground near Usopp, and as they get up, Klahadore comes out and calls them intruders.
10	10a	10	"The Bluff and the Bluffer" "The Weirdest Guy Ever! Jango the Hypnotist!"; Transliteration: "Shijō Saikyō no Hen na Yatsu! Saiminjutsushi Jango" (Japanese: 史上最強の変な奴!催眠術師ジャンゴ)	Munehisa Sakai	Junki Takegami	Masayuki Takagi	January 19, 2000	November 20, 2004	9; 12.7
At Kaya's mansion, Klahadore goes on about how Usopp's father is a filthy pirate, making Usopp livid enough to punch him in the face. Klahadore continues taunting Usopp, who eventually leaves. Later, Kaya is crying in her room. Klahadore enters to bring her a meal and reminds her of the day he came to the mansion, when he was battered and her father took him in. He then claims that if anything happened to Kaya, he would not forgive himself. The Usopp Pirates, Nami, and Zoro encounter Jango, who claims to be only a passing hypnotist. He then hypnotizes the Usopp Pirates – and accidentally himself – into falling asleep in the middle of the road. Later, by a cliff overlooking the ocean, Luffy and Usopp witness Jango and Klahadore – whose true identity turns out to be that of the infamous pirate captain Kuro – plotting a raid of the village and Kaya's murder. Luffy yells at them not to get rid of Kaya, but Jango uses his hypnotism to put Luffy to sleep, causing him to fall off the cliff. He lands on his head and appears to be dead. They do not worry about Usopp knowing, because of his reputation as a liar.
11	10b 11a	11	"The Bluff and the Bluffer" / "The War at the Shore" "Expose the Plot! Pirate Butler, Captain Kuro!"; Transliteration: "Inbō o Abake! Kaizoku Shitsuji Kyaputen Kuro" (Japanese: 陰謀を暴け!海賊執事キャプテンクロ)	Shigeyasu Yamauchi	Junki Takegami	Yūji Hakamada	January 26, 2000	November 20, 2004	8; 12.1
11	10b 11a	11	"The Bluff and the Bluffer" / "The War at the Shore" "Expose the Plot! Pirate Butler, Captain Kuro!"; Transliteration: "Inbō o Abake! Kaizoku Shitsuji Kyaputen Kuro" (Japanese: 陰謀を暴け!海賊執事キャプテンクロ)	Shigeyasu Yamauchi	Junki Takegami	Yūji Hakamada	January 26, 2000	November 27, 2004	8; 12.1
Zoro, Nami and the Usopp Pirates are still waiting around for Luffy and Usopp. The Usopp Pirates mention how Usopp always goes to the coast. They then spot Usopp running up to them, but he does not respond to any of their questions and runs right past them. Usopp is unable to convince the villagers that pirates are coming and that they have to abandon their homes. Meanwhile, Zoro and the others find Luffy. At Kaya's mansion, Merry shows Kaya the glasses that she got him to buy for Klahadore's third year of being a caretaker. Usopp is also unable to convince Kaya of Kuro's assassination attempt and leaves but gets shot and injured by Merry in the process. Kuro announces his plans to attack the village at dawn. At sunset, Usopp remembers the stories he would tell Kaya, when Luffy and the Usopp Pirates arrive. Usopp tells them about Kuro's plan, but then says that he was joking about it. The Usopp pirates abandon him. Nami asks Usopp why he said he made everything up. Usopp replies that it is because he is a liar. He says how he loves the village and wants to protect it, so he will stand against the pirates. Luffy, Zoro, and Nami decide to join him, and so Usopp stands up, declaring that even though he is scared, he will fight.
12	11b	12	"The War at the Shore" "Clash with the Black Cat Pirates! The Great Battle on the Slope!"; Transliteration: "Gekitotsu! Kuroneko Kaizoku-dan Sakamichi no Daikōbō!" (Japanese: 激突!クロネコ海賊団坂道の大攻防!)	Jun'ichi Fujise	Junki Takegami	Takeo Ide	February 2, 2000	November 27, 2004	9; 13.2
Usopp, Luffy, Zoro, and Nami formulate a plan on the slope for when the pirates come. Meanwhile, Kuro breaks the glasses Kaya gave him and injures Merry with his clawed glove. Kuro then steps into Kaya's room, and he holds his blood-stained claw over Kaya's head, remembering the deed he has to commit the following day. By the coast, the Black Cat Pirates's ship approaches Syrup Village. Jango reiterates the plan to his men. Meanwhile, Luffy, Usopp, Zoro and Nami stand on the slope leading to the village and have poured a barrel of oil on it to make it slippery. The plan is that when the Black Cat Pirates slip on the oil, the four will spring out and attack them. Dawn breaks and the Black Cat Pirates land on the coast, spotting Luffy's boat. At that moment, Luffy and the others are waiting for the pirates as the sun has now risen. Nami hears the pirates coming from the north. Usopp notes that there is an identical slope at the north end of the village and they realize they are at the wrong coast. Panicking, Nami then realizes in horror that their ship is located at the north coast and their treasure will be robbed by the pirates. Luffy and Usopp take off running for the coast. Zoro and Nami start to leave but Nami slips on the oil and accidentally drags Zoro down the slope, stepping on him to climb back up. Zoro is unable to get up the slippery slope and he slides to the bottom, but eventually uses his swords to pull his way up. At the north coast, Usopp arrives but is surprised that Luffy hasn't come yet – Luffy is now lost. The Black Cat Pirates arrive and Usopp stands up to them but realizes he can't beat them by himself. He sees the pirates taking the treasure from the Straw Hats's ship and he says that the treasure belongs to him, and he'll give it to them if they leave. Jango decides to hypnotize Usopp instead but an enraged Nami arrives in the nick of time and whacks Usopp in the head, knocking him over, refusing to give up her treasure. Usopp then reports that Luffy has not arrived yet and is probably lost. The Black Cat Pirates then charge and Usopp stands up to them but they knock him down swiftly. Usopp struggles to fight them but there are far too many. He is shocked when they are all sent flying back and sees that Luffy and Zoro have arrived. In mad moods, Zoro yells at Nami about leaving him there and Luffy yells at Usopp for not telling him which way was north. However, united, the four face off against the invading Black Cat Pirates.
13	12	13	"The Black Cat Pirates" "The Terrifying Duo! Meowban Brothers vs. Zoro!"; Transliteration: "Kyōfu no Futarigumi! Nyāban Burazāsu tai Zoro" (Japanese: 恐怖の二人組!ニャーバン兄弟VSゾロ)	Hidehiko Kadota	Junki Takegami	Kenji Yokoyama	February 9, 2000	December 4, 2004	7; 14.7
Jango kneels beside the fallen pirates and starts to hypnotize them. Once the hypnotism takes effect, the pirates became wild and ravenous, and foaming at their mouths, they charge at the Straw Hats. One pounds down a cliff with his fist. Zoro says that he and Luffy will handle it but Luffy was also hypnotized, becoming a wild animal himself. Luffy charges down the slope and uses his Gum-Gum Gatling technique to plow through the pirates with ease. Luffy keeps charging, and soon runs past the pirates, causing Jango to fear that he will be the next target. Luffy takes the bow of Kuro's ship in an attempt to kill him but Jango hypnotizes Luffy and so Luffy falls asleep, the bow falling on top of him and squishing him as he does this. With Luffy out of the way, Jango prepares for the next attack. Seeing the pirates are defeated, he calls for Siam and Butchie and orders them to attack. They turn out to be cowards, but after some heavy persuasion they charge for Zoro. Zoro blocks their claws with his sword, and engages in a great fight with the two Meowban Brothers. Zoro slashes Siam through the lowersection, but finds out Siam has a very thin waist. He sits on top of Zoro and Buchie leaps down, but Zoro manages to avoid the bone-crushing attack that leaves a crater. Butchie then uses his cat-like abilities to steal Zoro's two swords and throws them away. Zoro has no chance to grab them and faces another assault by the Nyaban Brothers. Usopp decides to help and fires at the brothers but Zoro blocks it with his back, yelling at Nami and Usopp to not get themselves killed. Nami then runs for Zoro's swords, picking them up but Jango reacts swiftly and slashes her in the shoulder with his chakram. Just as Jango and the others are about to kill the Straw Hats, Kuro appears at time, enraged that his plan has been completely foiled.
14	13	14	"Good Pirates vs. Bad Pirates" "Luffy Back in Action! Miss Kaya's Desperate Resistance!"; Transliteration: "Rufi Fukkatsu! Kaya-ojōsama no Kesshi no Teikō" (Japanese: ルフィ復活!カヤお嬢様の決死の抵抗)	Yukio Kaizawa	Junki Takegami	Eisaku Inoue	February 16, 2000	December 11, 2004	10; 12.8
The episode begins with Kuro standing impatiently. Siam and Butchie decide that Kuro, having been inactive for three years, has lost his edge and that they can defeat him. They charge at Kuro but only swing at thin air and Kuro appears behind them, holding his claws to their necks. He says that everyone has five minutes to finish their job or he will kill them all. He releases the Meowban Brothers, pushing them so that they can continue their battle with Zoro. However, Nami sees her chance and kicks Zoro's swords through the air. Zoro catches them and as the Meowban Brothers charge at him he unleashes a great Toragiri, taking both of them down with one mighty swing. He turns to Kuro and declares he won't even need five minutes. Nami realizes how dangerous Kuro is and so runs to wake up Luffy. As she runs, Jango spots her and hurls a chakram at her. Nami turns and steps on Luffy's face, waking up Luffy abruptly. He springs up and pull Nami down just as the chakram strikes him right in the mouth. Luffy stays standing though and he breaks the chakram with his teeth. He then sees Nami is wounded, and furious, prepares for battle with Kuro. At the mansion, Kaya wakes up from a nightmare and she heads down the stairs to find the Merry leaning against the wall, bloody and wounded. Merry explains the whole situation to Kaya, how Kuro is planning to kill her and take her money in a will. Kaya realizes that Usopp was telling the truth the entire time and so she puts on her overcoat and sets out. She arrives at the top of the slope and tells Kuro to stop immediately and that Merry told her everything. Kuro turns to her and wonders why Merry isn't dead and Kaya sees the state Usopp is in. Usopp charges in and aims a punch at Kuro's face, but Kuro avoids the swing and so Usopp careens into the ground. Kaya then pulls out a gun and points it at Kuro, ordering him to leave the village. Kuro reminds Kaya of the fun times they had together, and Kaya hesitates. Kuro takes the gun from Kaya's hands, knowing she won't shoot and he drops it to the ground. Usopp picks up the gun and fires at Kuro, but Kuro sidesteps the shot and knocks Usopp down. From out of nowhere flies Luffy's Gum-Gum Pistol, striking Kuro in the face. As Kuro falls back, Luffy retracts his arm and declares that he has a hundred more where that came from.
15	14	15	"The Purr-fect plan" "Beat Kuro! Usopp the Man's Tearful Resolve!"; Transliteration: "Kuro o Taose! Otoko Usoppu Namida no Ketsui!" (Japanese: クロを倒せ!男ウソップ涙の決意!)	Kōnosuke Uda	Junki Takegami	Masayuki Takagi	February 23, 2000	December 18, 2004	6; 14.4
Siam and Buchie (of the Meowban Brothers) face off once again against Zoro, as Luffy and Kuro begin their fight. Usopp orders the Usopp Pirates to run away with Kaya and keep her safe, but Jango goes after them and Zoro goes after both while carrying Usopp in order to find the way. A flashback reveals that Kuro faked his death by hypnotizing one of his men into claiming to be him and hypnotizing Morgan to think that he caught him before becoming Kaya's butler.
16	15	16	"The Long Arm of the Claw" "Protect Kaya! The Usopp Pirates' Great Efforts!"; Transliteration: "Kaya o Mamore! Usoppu Kaizoku-dan dai Katsuyaku!" (Japanese: カヤを守れ!ウソップ海賊団大活躍!)	Munehisa Sakai	Junki Takegami	Noboru Koizumi	March 1, 2000	January 8, 2005	8; 13.9
The episode begins with the Usopp Pirates and Kaya running from Jango through the forest. Jango hurls his chakram and cuts down many trees, searching everywhere for them and Kaya falls down. She tells the Usopp Pirates to run before they are killed but they stay and fight, deciding to follow their captain's orders and fight to the death for Kaya. Back at the slope, Kuro claims that he hated being a pirate. Luffy refuses to be like him and Kuro uses his Silent Step to move quickly. Luffy gets the timing right, however, and pounds Kuro down. Kuro gets back up and announces that he is going to kill his entire crew and that it was part of his plan from the beginning. Luffy claims that Usopp could beat Kuro. Kuro laughs it off and uses his ultimate attack "Shakushi", causing him to disappear. As Luffy wonders where he went, Nami finishes up looting the Black Cat pirate ship, disappointed by the amount of treasure. She then wonders if the battle is over, but sees that Kuro slashes through several of his crewmates taking them down quicker than the naked eye can see. Luffy gets even more angry but just after Kuro slashes him in the chest, he grabs Kuro's arm and slams him onto the ground. Kuro stands up and says that now his crew is suffering because Luffy wouldn't let them die quickly and so Kuro uses Shakushi once again to disappear. In the forest, at that moment, Jango continues searching for the Usopp Pirates, and they toss him a white flag. Jango walks forward and so the Usopp Pirates launch their ambush. Jango trips over a rope and one of the Usopp Pirates showers him with pepper, making him sneeze. The second jumps out and strikes Jango in the groin with a frying pan. The third leaps down from a large rock and takes a swing at Jango's head but Jango sits up in time and knocks his attacker away. Kaya then comes out, telling Jango not to hurt the kids, but Jango reports that it was his orders from Kuro to kill the children. Kaya then grabs Jango's chakram and holds it in front of her throat, threatening to kill herself without writing the will. Jango agrees and so he gets Kaya to write the will. Once finished, he grabs her by the neck and holds her against a tree, holding up a chakram to kill her. Zoro is still running through the woods with Usopp on his back and Usopp spots Jango. Kuro slices up the rocks, followed by cutting up Luffy's left shoulder as he glances in anger as the episode ends.
17	16	17	"The Cat's Ninth Life" "Anger Explosion! Kuro vs. Luffy! How it Ends!"; Transliteration: "Ikari Bakuhatsu! Kuro tai Rufi Ketchaku no Yukue!" (Japanese: 怒り爆発!クロVSルフィ決着の行方!)	Hidehiko Kadota	Junki Takegami	Yūji Hakamada	March 8, 2000	January 15, 2005	9; 14.1
Kuro's Shakushi attacks everything in the area, whether friend or foe and Luffy becomes fully enraged by his lack of regard for his crew. Luffy manages to catch Kuro by binding his limbs and headbutts him with Gum-Gum Bell, knocking him, while Usopp shoots Jango with an Exploding Star to save Kaya's life. Usopp convinces Kaya and the Usopp pirates to keep the incident a secret in order to enable the village to stay peaceful. Kaya gives the Straw Hats the Going Merry as a gift and Luffy invites Usopp into the crew, having befriended him.
18	17	18	"The Scrub in the Shrub" "You're the Weird Creature! Gaimon and His Strange Friends!"; Transliteration: "Anta ga Chinjū! Gaimon to Kimyō na Nakama" (Japanese: あんたが珍獣!ガイモンと奇妙な仲間)	Directed by : Jun'ichi Fujise; Storyboarded by : Kenji Yokoyama	Michiru Shimada	Tadayoshi Yamamuro	March 15, 2000	January 22, 2005	9; 12.0
The episode opens with Usopp pretending he is in a great battle as captain of the Going Merry, fending off attacking pirates. As he is doing so, Luffy announces that he has finished the pirate flag for their ship, and holds it up. It's a terribly drawn skull and crossbones, which horrifies the others. Usopp tells them that he is a great painter. He paints a pirate flag with his own face on it, which is rejected, so he paints a proper pirate flag, which is good enough to be accepted. They fly it on the mast and sail on. Nami spots an island in the distance with her telescope, saying it is the Legendary Treasure Island. Usopp explains that he heard there is a valuable treasure on the island, but if one tries to claim it, they will face God's wrath. As the Straw Hats draw nearer to the island, the weather turns foul and the waters choppy. After a tough sail they make it to the island, and head into the jungle, looking for treasure. Zoro lies down and starts to nap, to Usopp's shock. The Straw Hats soon find themselves surrounded by strange hybrid animals. A voice booms through the jungle, claiming to be the guardian god of the island and telling them to leave. Luffy picks up a lion pig that bites him on the face. The voice is shocked and Luffy explains he ate the Devil's Fruit. A gun then pokes out through a bush and shoots Luffy in the back, but Luffy bounces the bullet into the air with his Gum-Gum powers. Luffy then spots a twitching green bush, and the owner of the voice takes off running. Luffy, Usopp, and Nami catch up to the man, named Gaimon, who is boxed into a treasure chest. Luffy explains to him how he wants to go to the Grand Line and claim the One Piece to become the King of the Pirates, but Gaimon doesn't think he can do it. Luffy and Gaimon converse about how they can't read a map, and Nami is angered by this. Gaimon then explains how he became trapped in the treasure box as Zoro finally joins them. He explains that twenty years ago, he was with his crew in search of the treasure, and as they were leaving, he noticed how the captain never searched on top of a large cliff. Gaimon scaled the cliff but slipped and fell, getting stuck in the treasure box. He found that his crew had left, and he thought he would have the treasure on the ridge to himself, but found he could not climb in the box. When Luffy tries to pull Gaimon out of the box, he explains that his body grew to match the shape of the box, and his body will be ruined if the box is broken. Luffy then realizes that Gaimon uses the strange animals of the island to ward off visitors. Inspired by Gaimon's story, the Straw Hats decide to help Gaimon find the treasure. They come to the ridge and Luffy uses Gum-Gum Rocket to launch himself up to the top, where there are five treasure chests. He refuses to hand them over to Gaimon, and while this shocks and angers Nami and Usopp, Gaimon realizes that the treasure boxes must be empty. Luffy confirms this, and so Gaimon begins to cry, saying that he's been guarding nothing for twenty years. Luffy says it could be worse, as he could have died guarding nothing, and he offers Gaimon the chance to join their crew. Gaimon decides to stay with the strange animals of the island, however, as he has decided to protect them instead of the treasure. With this adventure behind them, the Straw Hats set sail in the Going Merry once again, waving goodbye to Gaimon as the episode draws to a close.
Baratie
19	18	19	"Zoro's Pledge" "The Three-Sword Style's Past! Zoro and Kuina's Vow!"; Transliteration: "Santōryū no Kako! Zoro to Kuina no Chikai!" (Japanese: 三刀流の過去!ゾロとくいなの誓い!)	Kōnosuke Uda	Junki Takegami	Eisaku Inoue	March 22, 2000	January 29, 2005	4; 14.3
While Usopp and Luffy fool around with the ship's cannon one day, Zoro dreams about his childhood. He had joined a dojo after losing to the teacher's daughter, Kuina. Despite training and growing stronger, he still was unable to defeat her. When she told him that he would one day defeat her as she grew comparatively weaker, Zoro grew upset over her defeatist attitude, and made her promise that one of them would be the greatest swordsman in the world. She died soon afterward, and Zoro dedicated himself to surpassing Kuina and fulfilling the promise. Back in the present, a bounty hunter attacks the ship, but Zoro recognizes him.
20	19	20	"King of the Busboys" "Famous Cook! Sanji of the Sea Restaurant!"; Transliteration: "Meibutsu Kokku! Kaijō Resutoran no Sanji" (Japanese: 名物コック!海上レストランのサンジ)	Yukio Kaizawa	Junki Takegami	Kenji Yokoyama	April 12, 2000	February 5, 2005	3; 15.0
After a review of the ending of the previous episode, the episode begins with Marine Lieutenant Iron Fist Fullbody pouring a drink to a beautiful lady on his marine ship and saying how he is taking her to the greatest restaurant in the world. The lady then questions if the restaurant is in the middle of the ocean, which Fullbody answers by telling her to just look forward to it. In the meantime, on the Going Merry, Zoro recognizes the intruder who got beat up by Luffy from the last episode as Johnny. Johnny then brings the Straw Hat pirates' attention to Yosaku, who lies ill on his and Johnny's small ship. It turns out that Johnny, Yosaku, and Zoro used to be bounty hunter partners some time ago. Johnny then proceeds to tell the Straw Hat pirates that he took Yosaku to a small rock island to rest, which was coincidentally blown up by Usopp and Luffy for target practice in the last episode. Usopp and Luffy quickly apologize. Johnny, however, was more worried about Yosaku's condition, which Nami quickly diagnoses as scurvy caused by a lack of Vitamin C. Luffy and Usopp then shove a bunch of lemons into Yosaku's mouth and Yosaku is revived!... for five minutes. The straw hat pirates conclude that they need a cook for their potential nutritional problems. Johnny points out that they probably can find a good candidate in the floating sea restaurant known as Baratie. Thus they head to Baratie, which is closeby. They are then passed by Fullbody's marine ship. Fullbody doesn't recognize the Straw Hat pirates' mark, but he recognizes Johnny and Yosaku as worthless pirate hunters. Johnny responds by shouting "this is what pirate hunters do" while throwing a bunch of wanted posters in the air. Nami takes note of the Arlong poster with an angry look and crumbles the poster in her hands. Fullbody then orders his crew to sink the pirate ship. Luffy attempts to deflect the cannon but after losing his grip accidentally deflects it to the head chief's room in Baratie, where the head chief was subsequently injured and demands that Luffy work off his crime by working at the restaurant for one year. In Baratie, while attempting to impress his girlfriend, Fullbody instead becomes humiliated by Sanji's witty remarks. It turns out that Sanji is actually the Assistant Head Chef. Frustrated, Fullbody destroys his table full of food. Sanji, who is angry that Fullbody wasted precious food, beats Fullbody up.
21	20	21	"Respecting Sanji" "Unwelcome Customer! Sanji's Food and Ghin's Debt!"; Transliteration: "Manekarezaru Kyaku! Sanji no Meshi to Ghin no On" (Japanese: 招かれざる客!サンジの飯とギンの恩)	Hidehiko Kadota	Junki Takegami	Masayuki Takagi	April 12, 2000	February 12, 2005	3; 15.0
After a review of the last episode, the episode begins with Patty, a cook for Baratie, picking his nose in the bathroom while making a monologue about how serving the customers who have money is the number one concern for a restaurant. Upon leaving the bathroom, Patty becomes furious when he sees that Sanji is beating up Fullbody, who is a customer. Sanji replies that customer or not, Fullbody insulted a chef and his food. At this moment, the head chef and Luffy come crashing down from the ceiling because the head chef was kicking Luffy too hard while trying to convince him that he has to work at Baratie for a whole year to pay off his debt. The head chef then kicks Sanji to calm him down and also kicks Fullbody out of the restaurant. Fullbody's subordinate then comes running into the restaurant yelling that their prisoner, a member of Don Krieg's pirates, has escaped. The customers are terrified because Don Krieg is supposedly the strongest pirate in the East Blue. The pirate shoots the marine from behind and comes in to order food. Patty recognizes the pirate as a customer and asks if the pirate has any money on him. The pirate points a gun at Patty and says "is a bullet okay?" Patty then beats the pirate up and doesn't recognize the pirate as a customer since he has no money. Sanji, on the other hand, heads to the kitchen and starts making a meal. Fullbody, in the meantime, leaves the restaurant sneakily (along with the subordinate who got shot earlier, who is still alive). Sanji brings his meal to the pirate, who was thrown out by Patty. Sanji states that, for him, a customer is anybody who is hungry, and that he understands the feeling of starvation more than anybody else. The pirate then grabs the meal and gobbles it up, while crying and saying that this is the most delicious dish he has ever had in his entire life. Luffy, who was watching the whole thing, attempts to recruit Sanji as the cook for his crew. After refusing and some conversing, it is revealed that the head chef used to be a notorious pirate and the restaurant often comes into conflict with other pirates after his fame. Luffy, as always, is stubborn and insists that Sanji joins them. We also find out that the other pirate's name is Ghin. Meanwhile, in the kitchen, the line cooks explain that Don Krieg is the captain of a fleet of fifty ships. Ghin thanks Sanji for the meal and leaves. Sanji throws the dishes into the ocean to get rid of the evidence that he is giving out food for free, which makes Ghin even more grateful. Luffy is then sent back to work, where he ends up breaking even more dishes and makes a big commotion in the kitchen. The rest of the crew, Zoro, Nami, and Usopp, turn out to be eating at the restaurant. Sanji, after seeing Nami, is captivated by her beauty. While flirting with Nami, the head chef tells Sanji that he's annoying and that he doesn't need him anymore. Meanwhile, Ghin informs Don Krieg of the restaurant, where Don Krieg makes clear his intention to "visit" the restaurant.
22	21	22	"Recipe for Disaster" "The Strongest Pirate Fleet! Commodore Don Krieg!"; Transliteration: "Saikyō no Kaizoku Kantai! Teitoku Don Kurīku" (Japanese: 最強の海賊艦隊!提督ドン·クリーク)	Directed by : Yōko Ikeda; Storyboarded by : Kōnosuke Uda	Junki Takegami	Kazuya Hisada	April 26, 2000	February 19, 2005	8; 12.2
Ghin returns to the Baratie with his commodore, Don Krieg, on a nearly-destroyed ship, and begs the cooks to feed him. Sanji feeds him again, despite knowing that he is dangerous. Krieg betrays him and demands a hundred meals for his men, as well as the restaurant ship. The cooks oppose Sanji, but Zeff agrees to prepare the food.
23	22	23	"The Red Footed Pirate" "Protect Baratie! The Great Pirate, Red Foot Zeff!"; Transliteration: "Mamore Baratie! Dai Kaizoku – Akaashi no Zefu" (Japanese: 守れバラティエ!大海賊·赫足のゼフ)	Munehisa Sakai	Junki Takegami	Noboru Koizumi	May 3, 2000	February 26, 2005	—
It is revealed that Chef Zeff was a great pirate known as "Red Foot" Zeff who beat Krieg and sailed in the Grand Line, but lost his leg at some point after returning from the Grand Line. Ghin explains the terrific catastrophe the fleet met in Grand Line when they encountered "Hawk-Eyes" Mihawk, who destroyed all but one of their ships. Krieg feeds his men and is about to begin to attack the Baratie when Mihawk, having followed Krieg and his men, destroys Krieg's ship. The situation turns dire when Luffy, Zoro and Usopp learn from Johnny and Yosaku that Nami stole the Going Merry a with the treasures and has escaped, much to big shock for Luffy, Zoro and Usopp.
24	23	24	"The Better Swordsman" "Hawk-Eye Mihawk! The Great Swordsman Zoro Falls at Sea!"; Transliteration: "Taka no Me no Mihōku! Kengō Zoro Umi ni Chiru" (Japanese: 鷹の目のミホーク!剣豪ゾロ海に散る)	Hidehiko Kadota	Michiru Shimada	Yūji Hakamada	May 10, 2000	March 5, 2005	8; 11.9
As Nami steals the Going Merry and escapes, Mihawk has returned to finish the job, but Zoro challenges him to a duel in order to achieve his dream of being the greatest swordsman in the world. Despite his best efforts, Zoro is easily outclassed by Mihawk and loses. Seeing potential in the young swordsman, Mihawk tells Zoro he has much to learn, and he will hold the title as the greatest swordsman in the world until they duel again. Following his defeat, Zoro apologizes to Luffy for disappointing him and swears that until the day he defeats Mihawk, he will never lose another duel. Luffy accept its and sends Zoro, Usopp, Johnny and Yosaku ahead to follow Nami so that he can defeat Krieg and crew to pay his debt to the Baratie.
25	24	25	"Pearl Jam" "The Deadly Foot Technique Bursts Forth! Sanji vs. The Invincible Pearl!"; Transliteration: "Hissatsu Ashiwaza Sakuretsu! Sanji tai Teppeki no Pāru" (Japanese: 必殺足技炸裂!サンジVS鉄壁のパール)	Yūji Endō	Michiru Shimada	Takeo Ide	May 17, 2000	March 12, 2005	5; 13.7
Mihawk leaves after defeating Zoro, so Krieg begins his invasion. He has Pearl, one of his stronger crewmates, attack, and Sanji reveals his fighting skills with his kicking-based fighting style, gaining the upper hand on Pearl, but Ghin takes Zeff hostage.
26	25	26	"Stranded" "Zeff and Sanji's Dream! The Illusory All Blue!"; Transliteration: "Zefu to Sanji no Yume Maboroshi no Ōruburū" (Japanese: ゼフとサンジの夢·幻のオールブルー)	Munehisa Sakai	Michiru Shimada	Eisaku Inoue	May 24, 2000	March 19, 2005	7; 13.1
With Zeff held captive by Gin, Sanji has no choice but to take Pearl's hits. He reveals his childhood that he worked on a cruise ship that Zeff returned from the Grand Line and attacked, and when a storm hit, the two were the only survivors. Zeff sacrificed his leg to save Sanji and gave Sanji food, as both shared the same dream of finding the legendary ocean, All Blue – supposedly a place where the four seas meet and all the world's sealife intermingles. No longer able to fight with his legs and be a pirate, Zeff founded the Baratie. Sanji claims that he will defend the Baratie with his life, and an enraged Luffy responds by attacking the ship's porch with Gum-Gum Axe.
27	26	27	"Here We Go A Ghin" "Cool-headed, Cold-hearted Demon! Pirate Fleet Chief Commander Gin!"; Transliteration: "Reitetsu Hijō no Kijin Kaizoku Kantai Sōchō Gin" (Japanese: 冷徹非情の鬼人·海賊艦隊総隊長ギン)	Kōnosuke Uda	Junki Takegami	Kenji Yokoyama	May 31, 2000	March 26, 2005	3; 14.2
Ghin finishes off Pearl, claiming that he wants to kill Sanji himself. A lengthy battle ensues but Ghin eventually gains the upper hand after Sanji breaks his ribs. Gin, however, comes to terms with himself, realizing he does not have the strength to kill the man who saved him from malnutrition. He then begs Krieg to leave the Baratie alone but Krieg is so disgusted with this show of emotion. Because of this, He then pulls off one of his shoulder pads, attaches it to his hand and it turns into a launcher for one of his deadliest weapons, the MH5 Poison Gas Bomb. Ghin and even all the Krieg pirates are shocked at this means of execution and are quick to put on their masks, Luffy attempts to make a beeline for Krieg, but is thrown back by the Needle Gun concealed in the launcher shoulder pad and Gin throws his mask in the sea since Krieg has tell him that Ghin is no longer part of Krieg pirates and Krieg decides to have him executed. Krieg fires the MH5 and all the Baratie chefs swim away to underwater while Patty and Carne run inside with Zeff to close the Baratie while Luffy steals two masks from two Krieg pirates and throws them to Sanji and Gin. He turns round to get another for himself but the pirates have vanished out to sea and he begins to panic as the MH5 explodes.
28	27	28	"Blitz Krieg" "I Won't Die! Fierce Battle! Luffy vs. Krieg!"; Transliteration: "Shinanee yo! Gekitō Rufi tai Kurīku!" (Japanese: 死なねェよ!激闘ルフィVSクリーク!)	Junji Shimizu	Junki Takegami	Masayuki Takagi	June 7, 2000	April 2, 2005	9; 12.1
Out of nowhere, a gas mask lands in Luffy's lap and he quickly puts it on just before the MH5 impacts and explodes. It is revealed that the mask was Gin's while he held Sanji's to Sanji's face. Krieg succeeds in poisoning Gin and Patty and Carne pull him inside the Baratie to administer first aid. Outraged once again, Luffy runs for Krieg, who pulls out his Needle Gun again, but the bullets don't even hinder Luffy despited he is a human rubber as he prepeares his Gum-Gum Pistol. Krieg pulls out his spiked Porcupine Cape and covers himself, but Luffy punches right into Krieg's face, much to big shock for Krieg pirates, Baratie chefs, Sanji and even Zeff. Luffy seems to have the advantage in the fight until Krieg pulls out his explosive Battle Spear. Luffy takes a hit every time he strikes the spear, but eventually breaks the tip.
29	28	29	"The Crack of Don" "The Conclusion of the Deadly Battle! A Spear of Blind Determination!"; Transliteration: "Shitō no Ketchaku! Hara ni Kukutta Ippon no Yari!" (Japanese: 決闘の決着!腹にくくった1本の槍!)	Jun'ichi Fujise	Junki Takegami	Kazuya Hisada	June 21, 2000	April 9, 2005	10; 10.6
Luffy continues battling Krieg, who retreats up a mast. Luffy follows and knocks him into the air, while Krieg drops explosives to bring down the mast. Luffy, unfazed, punches through Krieg's armour but Krieg ensnares him in an iron net to bring them both down to the sea. Luffy frees his arms and limbs, corkscrews himself around Krieg's head with his feet and slams him with a Gum-Gum Gavel into the deck, injuring and knocking him. Sanji dives to save Luffy from drowning. After the fierce battle ends, Ghin resolves to take Krieg's ambition to sail the Grand Line as his own. He subdues Krieg, who was on a delirious rampage, and leads the crew away with ambitions of his own, supposing he survives his poisoning. Elsewhere, Nami expresses remorse for leaving and hopes she can sail with the others again.
30	29	30	"New Crew" "Set Sail! The Seafaring Cook Sets Off with Luffy!"; Transliteration: "Tabidachi! Umi no Kokku wa Rufi to Tomo Ni" (Japanese: 旅立ち!海のコックはルフィとともに)	Hidehiko Kadota	Junki Takegami	Noboru Koizumi	June 28, 2000	April 16, 2005	6; 13.2
Sanji makes the difficult decision on whether to stay or to go with Luffy just as Yosaku comes back with news that he knows where Nami is.
Arlong Park
31	30	31	"The Mermen" "The Worst Man in the Eastern Seas! Fishman Pirate Arlong!"; Transliteration: "Higashi no Umi Saiaku no Otoko! Gyojin Kaizoku Āron!" (Japanese: 東の海最悪の男!魚人海賊アーロン!)	Yūji Endō	Michiru Shimada	Yūji Hakamada	July 12, 2000	April 23, 2005	8; 11.5
The crew chases after Nami, who stole their ship, and Yosaku takes time during the trip to explain about Arlong and his Fishmen to Luffy and Sanji. Meanwhile, Usopp, Johnny, and Zoro arrive at the island Nami docked at.
32	31	32	"The Thief With a Heart of Gold" "Witch of Cocoyashi Village! Arlong's Female Leader!"; Transliteration: "Kokoyashi Mura no Majo! Āron no On'nakanbu" (Japanese: ココヤシ村の魔女!アーロンの女幹部)	Munehisa Sakai	Michiru Shimada	Takeo Ide	July 19, 2000	April 30, 2005	2; 13.1
Zoro is captured by the fishmen after Usopp and Johnny ditch him, and it's revealed that Nami was part of Arlong's crew the entire time. When a group of Fishmen attack Cocoyashi Village, Usopp comes to the rescue.
33	32	33	"The Marked Marksman" "Usopp Dead?! When Is Luffy Going to Make Landfall?!"; Transliteration: "Usoppu Shisu? Rufi Jōriku wa Mada?" (Japanese: ウソップ死す!?ルフィ上陸はまだ?)	Yukio Kaizawa	Michiru Shimada	Eisaku Inoue	July 19, 2000	May 7, 2005	2; 13.1
After Zoro escapes with Nami's help, she tries to prove her loyalty to the Arlong Pirates by appearing to kill Usopp. Meanwhile, Luffy's group finally arrives at the island.
34	33	34	"It Takes A Thief" "Everyone's Gathered! Usopp Speaks the Truth About Nami!"; Transliteration: "Zen'in Shūketsu! Usoppu ga Kataru Nami no Shinjitsu" (Japanese: 全員集結!ウソップが語るナミの真実)	Junji Shimizu	Michiru Shimada	Kenji Yokoyama	July 26, 2000	May 14, 2005	5; 12.7
Johnny tells the others about Nami killing Usopp and an angry Luffy doesn't believe them until Nami appears herself and confirms it. She tells them to stay out of her business and leave without her, but Luffy stubbornly decides to stay on the island. Elsewhere, Arlong intercepts a cannonball from an incoming Marine ship, which he sends his men to sink. Usopp returns to the others, revealing that Nami only pretended to kill him, and Nami's older sister, Nojiko, starts to explain the truth as to why Nami is acting the way she is.
35	34a	35	"The Belle of the Brawl" "Untold Past! Female Warrior Bellemere!"; Transliteration: "Himerareta Kako! On'nasenshi Berumēru!" (Japanese: 秘められた過去!女戦士ベルメール!)	Hidehiko Kadota	Michiru Shimada	Masayuki Takagi	August 2, 2000	May 21, 2005	6; 11.5
Nojiko starts her story about Nami's childhood and their adopted mother, Bellemere, a former Marine. After a bloody battle in a small village between pirates and Marines that left her the only apparent survivor from both sides, Bellemere finds toddler Nojiko holding an infant Nami. Taking the girls back to her home, Cocoyashi, Bellemere decides to adopt Nami and Nojiko as her daughters. Despite being poor and unrelated by blood, they have a happy life. Nami proves to be a prodigy in cartography and navigation. One day, angered by their relative poverty, Nami storms off to the village, where Genzo tells her the story of how she was found. Nojiko comes to retrieve her for dinner, which Bellemere is cooking. At that moment, Arlong invades with his crew, demanding tribute on penalty of death - 100,000 berries per adult and 50,000 per child, monthly. The villagers all pay, at which point smoke is spotted coming from Bellemere's house on the outskirts. Fearing for her safety, Nojiko and Nami run towards home.
36	34b	36	"The Belle of the Brawl" "Survive! Mother Bellemere and Nami's Bond!"; Transliteration: "Ikinuke! Haha Berumēru to Nami no Kizuna!" (Japanese: 生き抜け!母ベルメールとナミの絆!)	Kōnosuke Uda	Michiru Shimada	Kazuya Hisada	August 9, 2000	May 21, 2005	5; 12.2
Nojiko continues her story about Nami's childhood, explaining how their life was ruined when the Arlong Pirates first took over the village. When the Fishmen arrive at Bellemere's house, she tries to fight back but is easily subdued. Having only 100,000 berries, Bellemere uses it to save Nami and Nojiko, which results in Arlong killing her. Seeing a map skillfully drawn by Nami, Arlong kidnaps her and shanghaies her into joining the Arlong Pirates to make maps and charts for them. Arlong does make a deal with Nami: if she can gather 100,000,000 berries for him, Arlong will free Cocoyashi Village. It is shown that for the last eight years Nami has stolen countless amounts of money from other pirates, thus explaining why she hates the pirates and stole the Going Merry from the Straw Hats. However, Marine officer Nezumi arrives to confiscate the stolen hoard as government property.
37	35	37	"You Dirty Rat!" "Luffy Rises! Result of the Broken Promise!"; Transliteration: "Rufi Tatsu! Uragirareta Yakusoku no Ketsumatsu!" (Japanese: ルフィ立つ!裏切られた約束の結末)	Jun'ichi Fujise	Michiru Shimada	Hideaki Maniwa	August 16, 2000	May 28, 2005	5; 11.4
Officer Nezumi is revealed to be in league with Arlong, and injures Nojiko in order to depart with all the money, from which he will be paid. Genzo reveals to Nami that the village has known of her deception all these years, keeping quiet so as not to pressure her with their hopes. Seeing Arlong's latest underhandedness, the villagers decide that enough is enough and they must fight back, despite Nami's pleas. Despite knowing they'll be killed, the villagers rush to Arlong Park. The Straw Hats see Nami's sorrow, and when she finally asks for help, Luffy puts his hat on her head, and the crew heads for Arlong Park themselves, storming the place before the villagers can.
38	36	38	"War of the Species" "Luffy in Big Trouble! Fishmen vs. the Luffy Pirates!"; Transliteration: "Rufi Dai Pinchi! Gyojin tai Rufi Kaizoku-dan" (Japanese: ルフィ大ピンチ!魚人VSルフィ海賊団)	Yūji Endō	Michiru Shimada	Yūji Hakamada	August 23, 2000	June 4, 2005	3; 13.6
The Straw Hats face the Fishmen themselves as the villagers watch from the sidelines. However, after using a Gum-Gum Pinwheel to take out the Fishmen's sea king Momoo, Luffy gets his feet stuck into the ground and Arlong throws Luffy into the ocean.
39	37a	39	"Arms Against Arms" "Luffy Submerged! Zoro vs. Hatchan the Octopus!"; Transliteration: "Rufi Suibotsu! Zoro tai Tako no Hatchan" (Japanese: ルフィ水没!ゾロVSタコのはっちゃん)	Junji Shimizu	Michiru Shimada	Kenji Yokoyama	August 30, 2000	June 11, 2005	5; 14.4
Zoro faces the six-sword–wielding octopus Hatchan. Using Johnny and Yosaku's swords and fighting through his injuries, Zoro is able to defeat Hatchan.
40	37b 38a	40	"Arms Against Arms" / "The Comeback Kid" "Proud Warriors! Sanji and Usopp's Fierce Battles!"; Transliteration: "Hokori Takaki Senshi! Gekitō Sanji to Usoppu" (Japanese: 誇り高き戦士!激闘サンジとウソップ)	Directed by : Yōko Ikeda; Storyboarded by : Kōnosuke Uda	Michiru Shimada	Tadayoshi Yamamuro	September 6, 2000	June 11, 2005	8; 13.6
40	37b 38a	40	"Arms Against Arms" / "The Comeback Kid" "Proud Warriors! Sanji and Usopp's Fierce Battles!"; Transliteration: "Hokori Takaki Senshi! Gekitō Sanji to Usoppu" (Japanese: 誇り高き戦士!激闘サンジとウソップ)	Directed by : Yōko Ikeda; Storyboarded by : Kōnosuke Uda	Michiru Shimada	Tadayoshi Yamamuro	September 6, 2000	June 18, 2005	8; 13.6
With Hatchan defeated, two of the fishmen battle Sanji and Usopp. Things look grim for Sanji as he attempts to face Kuroobi underwater and save Luffy, and Usopp gets the chance to prove that he too is real pirate and a brave warrior by facing Chew.
41	38b	41	"The Comeback Kid" "Luffy at Full Power! Nami's Determination and the Straw Hat!"; Transliteration: "Rufi Zenkai! Nami no Ketsui to Mugiwara Bōshi" (Japanese: ルフィ全開!ナミの決意と麦わら帽子)	Munehisa Sakai	Michiru Shimada	Eisaku Inoue	September 13, 2000	June 18, 2005	4; 13.6
Arlong's officers have been defeated, but Sanji and Zoro prove to be no match for Arlong in their current state. However, with Luffy finally free and recovered, he just may be only able to defeat the "most wicked man in the East Blue". Meanwhile, Nami finally gathers the courage to face Arlong.
42	38c 39a	42	"The Comeback Kid" / "Wanted!" "Explosion! Fishman Arlong's Fierce Assault from the Sea!"; Transliteration: "Sakuretsu! Gyojin Āron Umi Kara no Mōkōgeki!" (Japanese: 炸裂!魚人アーロン海からの猛攻撃!)	Hidehiko Kadota	Michiru Shimada	Masayuki Takagi	September 27, 2000	June 18, 2005	2; 15.0
42	38c 39a	42	"The Comeback Kid" / "Wanted!" "Explosion! Fishman Arlong's Fierce Assault from the Sea!"; Transliteration: "Sakuretsu! Gyojin Āron Umi Kara no Mōkōgeki!" (Japanese: 炸裂!魚人アーロン海からの猛攻撃!)	Hidehiko Kadota	Michiru Shimada	Masayuki Takagi	September 27, 2000	June 25, 2005	2; 15.0
Luffy returns to the fight and the final battle with Luffy versus Arlong begins.
43	39b	43	"Wanted!" "End of the Fishman Empire! Nami's My Friend!"; Transliteration: "Gyojin Teikoku no Owari! Nami wa Ore no Nakama da!" (Japanese: 魚人帝国の終り!ナミは俺の仲間だ!)	Junji Shimizu	Michiru Shimada	Kazuya Hisada	September 27, 2000	June 25, 2005	2; 15.0
The battle spreads into Arlong Park itself and Arlong is no longer holding back. Luffy realizes that Nami was forced to draw charts for Arlong during eight years and becomes enraged. With one massive Gum-Gum Axe, he defeats Arlong and destroys Arlong Park, freeing Nami and the village and also vanishing Nami's hate to the pirates.
44	-	44	"Setting Out with a Smile! Farewell, Hometown Cocoyashi Village!"; Transliteration: "Egao no Tabitachi! Saraba Kokyō Kokoyashi Mura" (Japanese: 笑顔の旅立ち!さらば故郷ココヤシ村)	Kōnosuke Uda	Michiru Shimada	Yūji Hakamada	October 11, 2000	—	5; 13.2
With Arlong's defeat by Luffy, Arlong's reign of terror is over and no one has anything on their mind except to party the fall of Arlong Park. As the village celebrates, Nami reflects on her hometown and decides to officially join the Straw Hat Pirates.
45	39c	45	"Wanted!" "Bounty! Straw Hat Luffy Becomes Known to the World!"; Transliteration: "Shōkinkubi! Mugiwara no Rufi yo ni Shirewataru" (Japanese: 賞金首!麦わらのルフィ世に知れ渡る)	Directed by : Yōko Ikeda; Storyboarded by : Kenji Yokoyama	Junki Takegami	Hideaki Maniwa	October 25, 2000	June 25, 2005	6; 13.6
As a result of defeating Arlong as well as defeating Buggy and Don Krieg, Luffy now has the highest bounty in East Blue at 30,000,000 berries and infame as "Straw Hat" Luffy. News quickly spreads to both friend and foe, including Luffy's childhood idol Shanks, who celebrates Luffy's arrival into the world of pirates.
Buggy's Adventure
46	—	46	"Chase Straw Hat! Little Buggy's Big Adventure!"; Transliteration: "Mugiwara o Oe! Chiisana Bagī no Dai Bōken" (Japanese: 麦わらを追え!小さなバギーの大冒険)	Munehisa Sakai	Junki Takegami	Kenji Yokoyama	November 1, 2000	—	6; 14.4
After his defeat by Luffy, Buggy was sent flying to another island with several body parts missing. Thus, Buggy begins his journey to find his crew and his body parts to gets revenge for Luffy, making some unlikely friends with Gaimon. He is eventually picked up by a mysterious beautiful woman with a pirate ship, who wants him to help her looking for Luffy.
47	—	47	"The Wait Is Over! The Return of Captain Buggy!"; Transliteration: "Omachi Ka Ne! Aa Fukkatsu no Bagī Senchō" (Japanese: お待ちかね!ああ復活のバギー船長)	Hidehiko Kadota	Junki Takegami	Kazuo Takigawa	November 8, 2000	—	8; 13.5
With Buggy assumed to be dead, his crew fights over who will be the new captain, only to be captured by a tribe of cannibals. Buggy arrives in time to save them and regains his missing parts.
Loguetown
48	40a	48	"Roguetown" "The Town of the Beginning and the End! Landfall at Logue Town!"; Transliteration: "Hajimari to Owari no Machi – Rōgutaun Jōriku" (Japanese: 始まりと終わりの町·ローグタウン上陸)	Directed by : Jun'ichi Fujise; Storyboarded by : Kōnosuke Uda	Michiru Shimada	Eisaku Inoue	November 22, 2000	July 2, 2005	5; 15.7
The crew arrives at the last large town before the entrance to the Grand Line: Loguetown, the place where the King of the Pirates Gol D. Roger was both born and executed. They stock up on supplies and sightsee. As Luffy heads for the execution platform where Roger was executed, Luffy's old enemies are searching for him.
49	40b 41a	49	"Roguetown" / "Switched Blades" "Kitetsu III and Yubashiri! Zoro's New Swords and the Woman Sergeant Major!"; Transliteration: "Sandai Kitetsu to Yubashiri! Zoro no Shintō to Josōchō" (Japanese: 三代鬼徹と雪走!ゾロの新刀と女曹長)	Yoshihiro Ueda	Michiru Shimada	Tadayoshi Yamamuro	November 22, 2000	July 2, 2005	5; 15.7
49	40b 41a	49	"Roguetown" / "Switched Blades" "Kitetsu III and Yubashiri! Zoro's New Swords and the Woman Sergeant Major!"; Transliteration: "Sandai Kitetsu to Yubashiri! Zoro no Shintō to Josōchō" (Japanese: 三代鬼徹と雪走!ゾロの新刀と女曹長)	Yoshihiro Ueda	Michiru Shimada	Tadayoshi Yamamuro	November 22, 2000	July 9, 2005	5; 15.7
While searching for new swords to replace the ones shattered by Mihawk, Zoro meets a woman named Tashigi, a marine Sergeant Major with a passion for swords, who looks exactly like an older Kuina. She notices that Zoro is carrying a rare sword. Zoro, who has little money, inquires about a cheap sword, which the owner says is cursed. After an impressive test of the sword, the owner lets him have it for free, along with another rare sword he said should belong to a true swordsman.
50	—	50	"Usopp vs. Daddy the Parent! Showdown at High!" (Note: In the dub, this title is written on-screen but "Usopp vs. Daddy the Father! Showdown at High Noon!" is read aloud.); Transliteration: "Usoppu tai Kozure no Dadi Mahiru no Kettō" (Japanese: ウソップVS子連れのダディ真昼の決闘)	Directed by : Katsumi Tokoro; Storyboarded by : Junji Shimizu	Michiru Shimada	Masayuki Takagi	November 29, 2000	—	5; 15.2
Usopp manages to anger the daughter of bounty hunter Daddy the Father, and finds his own life at stake when he challenges Daddy to a duel, which he proceeds to lose. When Daddy discovers that Usopp is the son of Yasopp, he recounts how he lost to Yasopp, Usopp's father. Upon embarrassment of hearing this, Usopp issues a new challenge. Daddy challenges him to shoot a weather vane or he will kill Usopp. Usopp shoots the vane through the crown and wins the sniper goggles that were in dispute.
51	41b 42a	51	"Switched Blades" / "Sanji Sizzles" "Fiery Cooking Battle? Sanji vs. the Beautiful Chef!"; Transliteration: "Honō no Ryōri Batoru? Sanji tai Bijin Shefu" (Japanese: 炎の料理バトル?サンジVS美人シェフ)	Munehisa Sakai	Michiru Shimada	Kazuya Hisada	December 6, 2000	July 9, 2005	6; 14.0
51	41b 42a	51	"Switched Blades" / "Sanji Sizzles" "Fiery Cooking Battle? Sanji vs. the Beautiful Chef!"; Transliteration: "Honō no Ryōri Batoru? Sanji tai Bijin Shefu" (Japanese: 炎の料理バトル?サンジVS美人シェフ)	Munehisa Sakai	Michiru Shimada	Kazuya Hisada	December 6, 2000	July 16, 2005	6; 14.0
Sanji enters a cooking contest against a beautiful cooking woman named "Five-Alarm" Carmen for a fish that he has always dreamed of cooking. Sanji is able to win against Carme, Meanwhile, Luffy finally reaches the top of the execution platform.
52	42b 43a	52	"Sanji Sizzles" / "Buggy's Back" "Buggy's Revenge! The Man Who Smiles on the Execution Platform!"; Transliteration: "Bagī no Ribenji! Shokeidai de Warau Otoko!" (Japanese: バギーのリベンジ!処刑台で笑う男!)	Hidehiko Kadota	Michiru Shimada	Yūji Hakamada	December 13, 2000	July 16, 2005	5; 14.7
52	42b 43a	52	"Sanji Sizzles" / "Buggy's Back" "Buggy's Revenge! The Man Who Smiles on the Execution Platform!"; Transliteration: "Bagī no Ribenji! Shokeidai de Warau Otoko!" (Japanese: バギーのリベンジ!処刑台で笑う男!)	Hidehiko Kadota	Michiru Shimada	Yūji Hakamada	December 13, 2000	July 23, 2005	5; 14.7
Buggy and Alvida show up and capture Luffy to be executed, Zoro and Sanji show up too late to stop Buggy but a bolt of lightning shows up Buggy just in time to cancel the execution.
53	43b	53	"Buggy's Back" "The Legend Has Started! Head for the Grand Line!"; Transliteration: "Densetsu wa Hajimatta! Mezase Gurando Rain" (Japanese: 伝説は始まった!目指せ偉大なる航路(グランドライン))	Directed by : Ken Koyama; Storyboarded by : Yoshihiro Ueda	Michiru Shimada	Hideaki Maniwa	January 10, 2001	July 23, 2005	6; 14.1
Smoker catches Buggy and Alvida and gets on a Dune Buggy to follow Luffy, Meanwhile, Luffy, Zoro, and Sanji run into Tashigi. Zoro defeats her reluctantly. Then Smoker catches up and tells Luffy that he must get through him to go to the Grand Line. Luffy isn't able to effectively fight Smoker due to the latter's Plume-Plume Fruit powers allowing him to turn into smoke. Just when Smoker is about to finish off Luffy a mysterious man with a green cloak named Dragon saves him. A green gust of wind blows through that lets Buggy and Alvida escape. Then Luffy and company escape from Loguetown, Smoker, Tashigi, Buggy and Alvida all depart to chase the Straw Hats into the Grand Line, The Straw Hats reaches the entrance to the Grand Line and proclaim why they are going to the Grand Line: Sanji to find the All Blue, Luffy to become King of the Pirates, Zoro to become the greatest swordsman in the world, Nami to chart a map of the entire world, and Usopp to become a brave warrior in the sea.
Warship Island
54	—	54	"Precursor to a New Adventure! Apis, a Mysterious Girl!"; Transliteration: "Arata Naru Bōken no Yokan! Nazo no Shōjo Apisu" (Japanese: 新たなる冒険の予感!謎の少女アピス)	Kōnosuke Uda	Junki Takegami	Kenji Yokoyama	January 17, 2001	—	8; 14.1
On a stormy night, a mysterious girl called Apis escapes from the Marines and is found drifting by the Straw hats. Upon learning that they are good pirates, Apis hides some of the reasons why she is being pursued by the Marines. When the marines locate them, Apis tells the Straw Hats of an impending gust of wind. While this allows them to escape the Marines, it winds up sending them into the Calm Belt.
55	—	55	"Miraculous Creature! Apis' Secret and the Legendary Island!"; Transliteration: "Kiseki no Seibutsu! Apisu no Himitsu to Densetsu no Shima" (Japanese: 奇跡の生物!アピスの秘密と伝説の島)	Harume Kosaka	Junki Takegami	Masayuki Takagi	January 24, 2001	—	7; 15.3
Nami explains that The Calm Belt is revealed to have no winds or currents as well as being the home of many giant sea kings. Apis forms a plan with Luffy's help and escapes the sea kings by riding with one's sneeze. Later, the crew reaches Battleship Island, where they listen to the soporific story of the island's creation. Afterwards, Luffy & Nami follow Apis into a cave where a dragon is hidden. When Luffy is somehow able to understand the dragon, Apis tells them she ate the Whisper-Whisper Fruit and can read the minds of animals, Luffy and Nami find the reason why Apis is being chased.
56	—	56	"Eric Attacks! Great Escape from Warship Island!"; Transliteration: "Erikku Shutsugeki! Gunkanjima Kara no Dai Dasshutsu!" (Japanese: エリック出撃!軍艦島からの大脱出!)	Hidehiko Kadota	Junki Takegami	Kazuya Hisada	January 31, 2001	—	6; 14.7
Now that the crew understand why Apis was followed, they hurry to escape the island so Ryuuji can be saved, but they meet with Erik and the Marines. During the conflict Eric reveal he ate the Sickle-Sickle Fruit which allows him to create blades of wind. Zoro and Usopp bring the ship to a thin rock at the side while Nami and Apis get Ryuuji onto a cart. Luffy and Sanji fight the Marines to buy time for all preparations. In the end, the ship pulls the cart away on the search for Lost Island.
57	—	57	"A Solitary Island in the Distant Sea! The Legendary Lost Island!"; Transliteration: "Zekkai no Kotō! Densetsu no Rosuto Airando" (Japanese: 絶海の孤島!伝説のロストアイランド)	Yōko Ikeda	Junki Takegami	Kazuo Takigawa	February 7, 2001	—	8; 14.6
After arriving at what seemed to be Lost Island, the Straw Hats find an old Temple with paintings that might indicate where the Lost Island really is. Erik arrives and announces he overheard everything and intends to steal their dragon. Luffy breaks a wall so they can escape while Zoro engages Erik.
58	—	58	"Showdown in the Ruins! Tense Zoro vs. Eric!"; Transliteration: "Haikyō no Kettō! Kinpaku no Zoro tai Erikku!" (Japanese: 廃虚の決闘!緊迫のゾロVSエリック)	Munehisa Sakai	Junki Takegami	Tadayoshi Yamamuro	February 21, 2001	—	5; 16.6
Zoro tries to fight Erik, but Erik is more interested in chasing the dragon. Zoro manages to trip him up long enough to the rest to make it to the ship. Luffy then uses his long arm to pull Zoro onto the ship.
59	—	59	"Luffy, Completely Surrounded! Commodore Nelson's Secret Strategy!"; Transliteration: "Rufu Kanzen Hōi! Teitoku Neruson no Hissaku" (Japanese: ルフィ完全包囲!提督ネルソンの秘策)	Jun'ichi Fujise	Junki Takegami	Yūji Hakamada	February 21, 2001	—	5; 16.6
Admiral Nelson, who never fully trusted Erik, has mobilized the full extent of the 8th fleet. He has his ships surround the Going Merry, and deploys chains between them to prevent escape. They then begin shelling. Meanwhile, Erik boards the raft with Apis and Ryuuji and begins to row the raft away. Nelson orders his ship to shell Erik. When Erik knocks Apis out, Ryuuji comes to her aid. He then calls out and takes flight to attack Nelson. Nelson has him shot down.
60	—	60	"Through the Sky They Soar! The 1000-Year Legend Lives Again!"; Transliteration: "Ōsora o Mau Mono! Yomigaeru Sennen no Densetsu!" (Japanese: 大空を舞うもの!甦る千年の伝説)	Yoshihiro Ueda	Junki Takegami	Hideaki Maniwa	February 28, 2001	—	4; 16.3
Luffy talks to Ryuuji in his final moments and comes to understand just what is going on. The flock of dragons returns just as Lost Island (which was really Battleship Island) begins to resurface. An angered Luffy uses them to launch an attack that destroys Nelson's flagship. The resurfacing Lost Island destroys the rest of the Marine ships, which were still chained together, Apis is saddened by the Ryuuji's death but Luffy explains that the dragons come back to Lost Island be reborn. Nearby, an egg cracks open and a young dragon with Ryuuji's eyes emerges. Nelson, who has survived, is found by Erik who promptly kill him down.
61	44a	61	"Fantastic Voyage" "An Angry Showdown! Cross the Red Line!"; Transliteration: "Ikari no Ketchaku! Akai Dairiku o Norikoero!" (Japanese: 怒りの決着!赤い大陸を乗り越えろ!)	Hidehiko Kadota	Junki Takegami	Kenji Yokoyama	March 7, 2001	July 30, 2005	4; 16.0
Erik threatens the dragons which causes Luffy to fight and defeat him which sends Erik flying to the airs. With the dragons safe, the Straw Hats depart for the Grand Line. They sail to Reverse Mountain, where the force of the ocean causes the current to flow uphill and down into the Grand Line. On the way up, Erik emerges to fight one more time but Nami tricks him and knocks him into the rushing waters. (Note: The 4Kids version of this episode removes all scenes concerning the Apis/dragons storyline, including the confrontation with Erik on Reverse Mountain.)

== Critical reception ==
The season's uncut home video release generally received positive reviews from critics due to its humor, fight sequences, characters and music. The Arlong Park storyline has been highlighted as the strongest of the season, although David Brook less favorably described these episodes as "melodramatic" for Blueprint Review. Commenting on the animation, several critics applauded the series' accuracy to the manga's art style, but noted that moments of limited animation betrayed the low budget of the series.

Both John Sinnott and Neil Lumbard rated the season "Highly Recommended" when writing for DVD Talk, with Lumbard describing Luffy as "easily one of the most endearing, comical, and fun characters in anime history". Writing for Anime News Network, Carl Kimlinger awarded the first 26 episodes "B" ratings, but found the "emotional core" of the Captain Buggy episodes to be underwhelming and commented that the early episodes of the series did not match the standard that would be set by later episodes. Writing for Starburst, Julian White claimed that the series was "likely to give you one helluva migraine" and awarded 6/10 to the first 26 episodes. IGN's David F. Smith awarded the first 13 episodes 7/10, also commenting on the slow pace of the episodes but conceding that "you might just call it a convention of the genre".

Nefarious Reviews rated the season "Medium" saying that "the early episodes don't give a good first impression, but once the longer story begins, One Piece stretches it's creativity to give a good opening season with promises of so much more adventure". David F. Smith writing for IGN gave the uncut home video release a 7/10 saying that "One Piece is a pretty good time. It's a colorful, funny, action-packed kids' adventure show, and Funimation's wrapped it up in a well-produced package at a price that can't be beat."

== Home media release ==
=== Japanese ===
==== VHS ====
Toei Video/Avex Mode (Japan, VHS)
Volume		Episodes	Release date	Ref.
VHS ONE PIECE	piece1	1–4	February 21, 2001	
VHS ONE PIECE	piece2	5–8	February 21, 2001	
VHS ONE PIECE	piece3	9–12	March 21, 2001	
VHS ONE PIECE	piece4	13–16	April 18, 2001	
VHS ONE PIECE	piece5	17–20	May 23, 2001	
VHS ONE PIECE	piece6	21–24	June 20, 2001	
VHS ONE PIECE	piece7	25–28	July 18, 2001	
VHS ONE PIECE	piece8	29–32	August 22, 2001	
VHS ONE PIECE	piece9	33–36	September 19, 2001	
VHS ONE PIECE	piece10	37–40	October 24, 2001	
VHS ONE PIECE	piece11	41–44	November 21, 2001	
VHS ONE PIECE	piece12	45–48	December 19, 2001	
VHS ONE PIECE	piece13	49–52	January 17, 2002	
VHS ONE PIECE	piece14	53–56	February 14, 2002	
VHS ONE PIECE	piece15	57–61	March 20, 2002	

==== DVD ====
Avex Mode (Japan, Region 2 DVD)
Volume		Episodes	Release date	Ref.
ONE PIECE ワンピース	piece.01	1–4	February 21, 2001	
ONE PIECE ワンピース	piece.02	5–8	February 21, 2001	
ONE PIECE ワンピース	piece.03	9–12	March 22, 2001	
ONE PIECE ワンピース	piece.04	13–16	April 18, 2001	
ONE PIECE ワンピース	piece.05	17–20	May 23, 2001	
ONE PIECE ワンピース	piece.06	21–24	June 20, 2001	
ONE PIECE ワンピース	piece.07	25–28	July 18, 2001	
ONE PIECE ワンピース	piece.08	29–32	August 22, 2001	
ONE PIECE ワンピース	piece.09	33–36	September 19, 2001	
ONE PIECE ワンピース	piece.10	37–40	October 24, 2001	
ONE PIECE ワンピース	piece.11	41–44	November 21, 2001	
ONE PIECE ワンピース	piece.12	45–48	December 19, 2001	
ONE PIECE ワンピース	piece.13	49–52	January 17, 2002	
ONE PIECE ワンピース	piece.14	53–56	February 14, 2002	
ONE PIECE ワンピース	piece.15	57–61	March 20, 2002	
ONE PIECE Log Collection	"EAST BLUE"	1–17	July 23, 2010	
ONE PIECE Log Collection	"SANJI"	18–30	July 23, 2010	
ONE PIECE Log Collection	"NAMI"	31–44	August 27, 2010	
ONE PIECE Log Collection	"LOGUE TOWN"	45–61	August 27, 2010	

==== Blu-ray ====
The Eternal Log contains 16:9 versions of the episodes in standard definition Blu-ray format.

Avex Pictures (Japan, Region A BD)
Volume		Episodes	Release date	Ref.
ONE PIECE Eternal Log	EAST BLUE	1–61	January 22, 2021	

=== English ===
==== 4Kids ====
4Kids Entertainment Edited TV Version: Viz Media (USA, Region 1 DVD), Madman Entertainment (Australia, Region 4)
Volume		Episodes	Release date		ISBN	Ref.
Volume		Episodes	USA	Australia	ISBN	Ref.
1	King of the Pirates	1–3	February 28, 2006	May 17, 2006	ISBN 1-59861-000-7	
2	The Circus Comes to Town	4–6	April 25, 2006	July 26, 2006	ISBN 1-59861-001-5	
3	The Teller of Tales	7–11	June 27, 2006	September 6, 2006	ISBN 1-59861-002-3	
4	The Cat's Ninth Life	12–16	August 29, 2006	November 8, 2006	ISBN 1-59861-003-1	
5	King of the Busboys	17–21	October 24, 2006	January 24, 2007	ISBN 1-59861-004-X	
6	The Better Swordsman	22–26	December 26, 2006	March 14, 2007	ISBN 1-59861-005-8	
7	New Crew	27–31	February 27, 2007	May 2, 2007	ISBN 1-59861-006-6	
8	Belle Of The Brawl	32–36	April 24, 2007	July 18, 2007	ISBN 1-59861-007-4	
9	Rogue Town	37–41	June 26, 2007	September 12, 2007	ISBN 1-59861-008-2	
10	Baroque Works	42–46	August 28, 2007	November 7, 2007	ISBN 1-59861-009-0	
1-3	Starter Pack	1-11	N/A	March 14, 2007	ISBN N/A	

==== Uncut ====
In North America, the final episodes of this season were recategorized as the opening of "Season Two" for their DVD release by Funimation Entertainment. The Australian Season sets were renamed Collection 1 through 5.

Uncut English & Japanese versions: Funimation Entertainment (USA, Region 1), Manga Entertainment (UK, Region 2), Madman Entertainment (Australia, Region 4)
Volume		Episodes	Release date			ISBN	Ref.
Volume		Episodes	USA	UK	Australia	ISBN	Ref.
Season One	First Voyage	1–13	May 27, 2008	N/A	September 1, 2010	ISBN 1-4210-1347-9	
Season One	Second Voyage	14–26	September 16, 2008	N/A	October 13, 2010	ISBN 1-4210-1419-X	
Season One	Third Voyage	27–39	January 20, 2009	N/A	November 3, 2010	ISBN 1-4210-1531-5	
Season One	Fourth Voyage	40–53	March 31, 2009	N/A	December 15, 2010	ISBN 1-4210-1796-2	
Season Two	First Voyage	54–66	June 30, 2009	N/A	January 12, 2011	ISBN 1-4210-1888-8	
Collections	Collection 1	1–26	July 26, 2011	May 27, 2013	N/A	ISBN 1-4210-2341-5	
Collections	Collection 2	27–53	September 27, 2011	July 1, 2013	N/A	ISBN 1-4210-2404-7	
Collections	Collection 3	54–78	November 29, 2011	September 23, 2013	N/A	ISBN 1-4210-2405-5	
Treasure Chest Collection	One	1–103	N/A		October 24, 2012	ISBN N/A	
Voyage Collection	One	1–53	N/A		September 6, 2017	ISBN N/A	
